= Thuvia, Maid of Mars =

1916 novel by Edgar Rice Burroughs

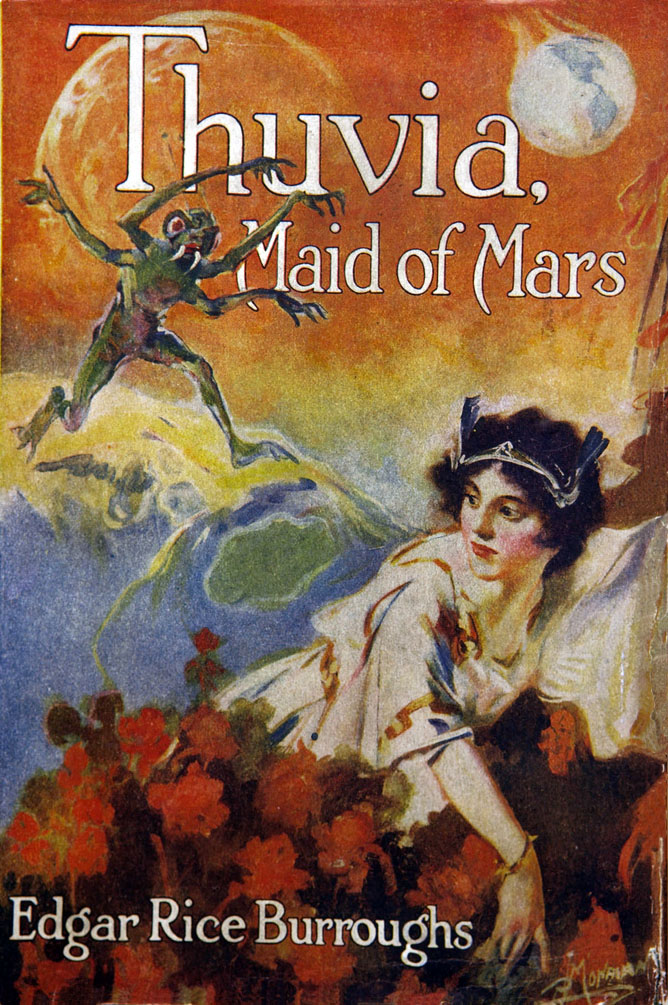
- Author: Edgar Rice Burroughs
- Illustrator: J. Allen St. John
- Language: English
- Series: Barsoom
- Genre: Science fantasy
- Publisher: A. C. McClurg
- Publication date: 1916
- Publication place: United States
- Media type: Print (hardback & paperback)
- Pages: 256, 10 pictorial plates (first edition hardcover)
- Preceded by: The Warlord of Mars
- Followed by: The Chessmen of Mars

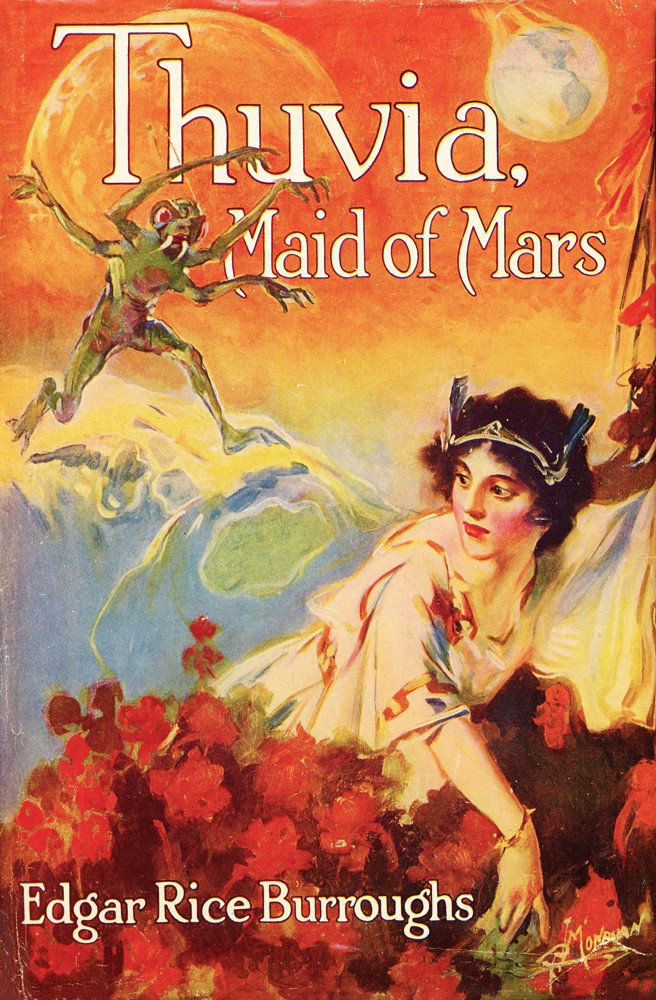
Thuvia, Maid of Mars was serialized in All Story Weekly in 1916.

Thuvia, Maid of Mars is a science fantasy novel by American writer Edgar Rice Burroughs, the fourth of the Barsoom series. The principal characters are Carthoris (the son of John Carter of Mars) and Thuvia of Ptarth, each of whom appeared in the previous two novels.

== Plot introduction ==
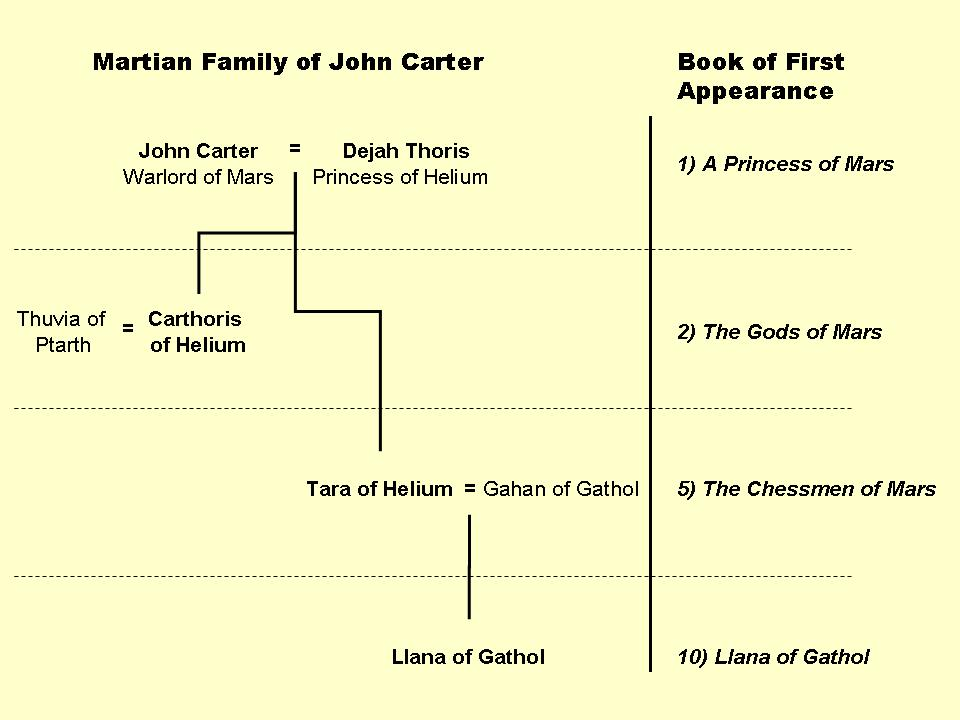
John Carter's descendants

In this novel the focus shifts from John Carter, Warlord of Mars, and Dejah Thoris of Helium, protagonists of the first three books in the series, to their son, Carthoris, prince of Helium, and Thuvia, princess of Ptarth. Helium and Ptarth are both prominent Barsoomian city state/empires, and both Carthoris and Thuvia were secondary characters in the previous two novels.

Its plot devices are similar to the previous Martian novels, involving the kidnapping of a Martian princess. This time John Carter's son Carthoris is implicated. It does however have some inventive and original ideas, including an autopilot and collision detection device for Martian fliers, and the creation of the Lotharians, a race of ancient Martians who have become adept at telepathic projection, able to create imaginary warriors that can kill, and sustain themselves through thought alone.

== Plot summary ==
Carthoris is madly in love with Thuvia. This love was foreshadowed at the end of the previous novel. Unfortunately Thuvia is promised to Kulan Tith, Jeddak of Kaol. On Barsoom nothing can break an engagement between a man and woman except death, although the new suitor may not cause that death. Thus it is that Thuvia will have none of him. This situation leaves Carthoris in a predicament.

As Thuvia suffers the common Burroughsian heroine's fate of being kidnapped and in need of rescue, Carthoris' goal is abetted by circumstances. Thus he sets out to find the love of his life. His craft is sabotaged and he finds himself deep in the undiscovered south of Barsoom, in the ruins of ancient Aanthor. Thuvia's kidnappers, the Dusar, have taken her there as well, and Carthoris is just in time to spot Thuvia and her kidnappers under assault by a green man of the hordes of Torquas. Carthoris leaps to her rescue in the style of his father.

The rescue takes Carthoris and his love to ancient Lothar, home of an ancient fair-skinned human race gifted with the ability to create lifelike phantasms from pure thought. They habitually use large numbers of phantom bowmen paired with real and phantom banths (Barsoomian lions) to defend themselves from the hordes of Torquas.

The kidnapping of Thuvia is done in such a way that Carthoris is blamed. This ignites a war between the red nations of Barsoom. Carthoris must try to be back in time with Thuvia to stop the war from breaking loose. Carthoris wonders if his love will ever be requited by the promised Thuvia.

== Background ==
Burroughs began writing Thuvia, Maid of Mars, in April 1914, at the time describing it as a 'Carthoris' story. After a break in California, he had begun a furious writing schedule, including other works as well as what was to become Thuvia, Maid of Mars. A new editor, Robert H. Davis, had replaced Newell Metcalf, the previous editor of All-Story Magazine (which had published Burrough's previous Barsoom novels), at the now amalgamated All-story Cavalier Weekly. Davis wrote to Burroughs on June 12, 1914 after reading previous fiction (including Tarzan), suggesting ideas and suggesting a meeting. Burroughs finished the story on June 20, 1914. Burroughs reached New York on June 23, and several days later mailed the finished typescript of what was still entitled "Carthoris", describing it as "another Martian story" he wished "to sell for use in All-Story Cavalier Weekly".

== Publication ==
The finished story was first published in All-Story Weekly as a serial in three parts on April 8, 15, and 22, 1916. It was later published as a complete novel by A. C. McClurg in October, 1920.

== Genre ==
The novel can be classed as a planetary romance. This genre is a subset of science fiction, similar to sword and sorcery, but including scientific elements. Most of the action in a planetary romance is on the surface of an alien world, usually includes sword fighting, monsters, supernatural elements as telepathy rather than magic, and involves civilizations echoing those on Earth in pre-technological eras, particularly composed of kingdoms or theocratic nations. Spacecraft may appear, but are usually not central to the story.

== Major characters ==
- Carthoris: Son of John Carter and Dejah Thoris who inherits his father's superior strength and ability with a sword. First appears as a supporting character in The Gods of Mars and The Warlord of Mars. A principal character in Thuvia, Maid of Mars and love interest of Thuvia.
- Thuvia of Ptarth: A Princess of Ptarth. She first appears in The Gods of Mars, among a group of Red Martians rescued by John Carter from the nefarious Therns who maintain the illusion of the Martian 'Heaven' in the Valley of Dor. She is later imprisoned with John Carter's wife Dejah Thoris and with Thern woman Phaidor, in a temple prison which can only be opened once per year and remains by Dejah Thoris' side for much of the novel and the sequel The Warlord of Mars. Like many of Burroughs Martian heroines, she is tough, courageous, proud and strongly identifies with her aristocratic position in Martian society. Also typically, she is abducted by evildoers (her rescue providing primary motivation for the plot of Thuvia, Maid of Mars) who wish to use her for political gain — in this case by Astok, Prince of Dusar, who blames the kidnapping on Cathoris.
- Kar Komak: A Lotharian bowman, with a noble and chivalrous personality (unlike the majority of the remaining Lotharians). While initially one of the phantoms projected by the Lotharians to fight off the Green Martian attacks on Lothar, he assumes a corporeal form after Carthoris and Thuvia leave Lothar, and turns out to have been a real Lotharian from the distant past. He joins the pair, fighting in the battles that follow. He is also able to create his own phantom bowmen to assist in combat.

== Setting ==
=== Scientific basis ===
Burroughs' vision of Mars was loosely inspired by astronomical speculation of the time, especially that of Percival Lowell, who saw the planet as a formerly Earthlike world now becoming less hospitable to life due to its advanced age, whose inhabitants had built canals to bring water from the polar caps to irrigate the remaining arable land. Lowell was influenced by Italian astronomer, Giovanni Virginio Schiaparelli, who in 1878, had observed features on Mars he called canali (Italian for "channels"). Mistranslation of this into English as "canals" fuelled belief the planet was inhabited. The theory of an inhabited planet with flowing water was disproved by data provided by Russian and American probes such as the two Viking missions which found a dead, frozen world where water could not exist in a fluid state.

=== World of Barsoom ===
A million years before the narrative commences, Mars was a lush world with oceans. As the oceans receded, and the atmosphere grew thin, the planet has devolved into a landscape of partial barbarism; living on an aging planet, with dwindling resources, the inhabitants of Barsoom have become hardened and warlike, fighting one another to survive. Barsoomians distribute scarce water supplies via a worldwide system of canals, controlled by quarreling city-states. The thinning Martian atmosphere is artificially replenished from an "atmosphere plant."

It is a world with clear territorial divisions between White-, Yellow-, Black-, Red-, and Green-skinned races. Each has particular traits and qualities, which seem to define the characters of almost every individual within them. Burroughs's concept of race in Barsoom is more similar to species, rather than ethnicity.

=== Technology ===
The Red Martians of Barsoom have fliers operating with a form of anti-gravity. Thuvia, Maid of Mars is notable in that John Carter's son, Carthoris, invents an apparent precursor of the autopilot (decades before an actual device was perfected). The mechanism allowed the pilot to reach any destination on Barsoom, although it required the pilot to keep the craft pointed in the right direction. Upon arrival, the mechanism also lowered the flier to the ground. Carthoris' flier was also equipped with an anti-collision device, which detected obstacles and automatically steered around them.

== Themes ==
While Burroughs is generally seen as a writer who produced work of limited philosophical value, Burroughs wrote two Barsoom novels that appear to explore, or parody, the limits of excessive intellectual development at the expense of bodily or physical existence. Thuvia, Maid of Mars, with its depiction of the Lotharians is the first. The Lotharians have mostly died out. They had been fleeing from the attacks of Green Martians, during which most of them were killed (including all women and children), when they found a defensible location and came to a dramatic realization that the mind is everything, and hence developed advanced telepathic powers including the ability to create phantom bowmen to combat their Green Martian adversaries. Such is the detail of their power of imagination that the bowmen even appear to die in combat, and the Green Martians are killed by their arrows. A Lotharian, Jav, explains to the protagonist, Carthoris, that the illusion is only maintained by the belief of the Green Martians. If they knew the truth it would not be effective.

The Lotharians also maintain the illusion of a functioning, normal Barsoomian society through powerful telepathic projections. They have formed two factions, which appear to portray the excesses of pointless intellectual debate - one faction, the realists, believes in imagining meals to provide sustenance, another, the etherealists, believes in surviving without eating.

The Chessmen of Mars is the second example of this trend. The Kaldanes have sacrificed their bodies to become pure brain, but although they can interface with Rykor bodies, their ability to function compared to a normal people, with an integrated mind and body, is ineffectual and clumsy.

== Copyright ==
The copyright for this story has expired in the United States and, thus, now resides in the public domain there. The text is available via Project Gutenberg.
