= John Carter, Warlord of Mars (role-playing game) =

Tabletop role-playing game

- Cover art by Russ Manning
- Designers: Michael S. Matheny
- Illustrators: Russ Manning
- Publishers: Heritage Models
- Publication: 1978

John Carter, Warlord of Mars is a role-playing game published by Heritage Models in 1978 that is based on the Barsoom novels of Edgar Rice Burroughs featuring the hero John Carter.

== Description ==
John Carter, Warlord of Mars is a science-fantasy system based on Edgar Rice Burroughs's novels of Barsoom, a Mars ruled by various humanoid warrior races that fight with sword and gun. Although it mainly consists of man-to-man combat rules for use with miniatures (as they were published to support a line of Barsoomian figures), it does include some rules for role-playing.

== Publication history ==
John Carter, Warlord of Mars was designed by Michael S. Matheny, with a cover by Russ Manning, and published by Heritage Models, Inc. in 1978 as a 64-page book.

There were at least two printings with different interior layout but both had a copyright date of 1978. One had a full color cover and one had a red tinted cover.

== Reception ==
In Issue 24 of Space Gamer, John J. Nutter thought the rules had been written in "an entertaining style" but found the editing was "atrocious. The text is a virtual cornucopia of misspellings." Despite this, Nutter called the content "quite accurate and a good working basis for the uninitiated player." Nutter also found that the game featured "a sound combat system and role-playing game which captures much of the flavor of the novels." However, Nutter noted the complete absence of travel by flier, which play a major role in John Carter stories.

In his 1991 book Heroic Worlds: A History and Guide to Role-Playing Games, Lawrence Schick called the rules "poorly organized" and commented that "Players unfamiliar with the concepts of role-playing games would probably be unable to use them."

== See also ==
- The Warlord of Mars, by Edgar Rice Burroughs
