= Allan and the Sundered Veil =

- Short story by Alan Moore
- Country: United Kingdom
- Language: English
- Genre: Horror/science fiction

Publication
- Published in: The League of Extraordinary Gentlemen, Volume One
- Publisher: WildStorm/DC Comics
- Media type: Comic
- Publication date: 1999–2000

"Allan and the Sundered Veil" is a six-part horror comic story written in the style of a boy's periodical by Alan Moore and illustrated by Kevin O'Neill, included at the back of each issue of The League of Extraordinary Gentlemen, Volume One and collected at the back of that volume. It serves as a prequel to the comic.

== Plot ==
Allan Quatermain, following his "death", returns to his friend, Lady Ragnall, to partake of the taduki drug she has (both are from the Allan Quatermain novels of H. Rider Haggard, who is referenced as an author who has written about Quatermain). Quatermain takes the drug and enters into a dream-world, encountering the equally lost John Carter (from Edgar Rice Burroughs' Barsoom novels) and his grandnephew, Randolph Carter (from H. P. Lovecraft's Cthulhu Mythos). Strange creatures begin to attack them but they are saved by the arrival of a pulsing electric machine piloted by a man known only as the Time Traveller (from H. G. Wells' The Time Machine).

They arrive at the Sphinx from The Time Machine, and the Time Traveller explains that they are there because creatures from beyond the universe are invading creation through a hole in space-time. They are attacked by albino creatures known as both Morlocks (from The Time Machine) and Mi-Go (from the Cthulhu Mythos). Quatermain beats them off as the time machine takes off, but one clings on and damages the ship. Destabilized, the time machine is drawn towards a "chrono-crystal aleph" (from Jorge Luis Borges's "The Aleph") and the riders all see visions from their pasts and futures.

Quatermain sees his first meeting with Mina Murray from the first League issue; a sojourn with Sir Henry Curtis; the final battle against Professor Moriarty's ship from the end of the first League volume; Mr. Hyde's destruction of a Martian Tripod from the end of the second League volume; and his, Randolph, and Mina's encounter with a Lovecraftian monster as seen in The New Traveller's Almanac. Randolph sees a vision of Arkham. John Carter sees a vision of him fighting a Green Martian and winning Dejah Thoris as she rides a Greater Thoat mount (from the Barsoom novels). What, if anything, the Time Traveller sees is not mentioned.

Randolph and John soon disappear to their visions upon realizing that they are not bound to their realm, leaving only Quatermain to help the Time Traveller against their enemy, but Quatermain's body becomes possessed by Ithaqua (the Cthulhu Mythos' incarnation of the Wendigo) and Quatermain returns to his realm to intervene. Lady Ragnall dies of shock before her African servant, Marisa, is able to free Quatermain using her tribe's precautions against the Great Old Ones. Appalled, Marisa flees the burning manor, taking the taduki with her.

Despondent at the loss of his friend and his drug, Quatermain spends the next few years drifting, eventually ending in Cairo. The story ends with him looking up from his drugged stupor into Mina Murray's face (as occurred in the League issue #1 and as he foresaw in his vision) as he is unwillingly—but fatefully—recruited into the League of Extraordinary Gentlemen.

== Relative chronologies ==
Among the characters, the story takes place at various points in their lives:

- Allan Quatermain: after his "death" in Allan Quatermain but before the first League volume
- Randolph Carter: during his titular dream quest in The Dream-Quest of Unknown Kadath
- John Carter: after his departure from Earth but before his arrival at Mars in A Princess of Mars
- The Time Traveller: following his return to the future at the end of The Time Machine
