= The Cavalier =

The Cavalier may refer to:

- The Scrap Book and The Cavalier, two related magazines published between 1906 and 1914
- Woodstock (novel), a novel by Walter Scott subtitled The Cavalier
