= Dejah Thoris =

Character in Edgar Rice Burroughs's Martian novels

- Barsoom character
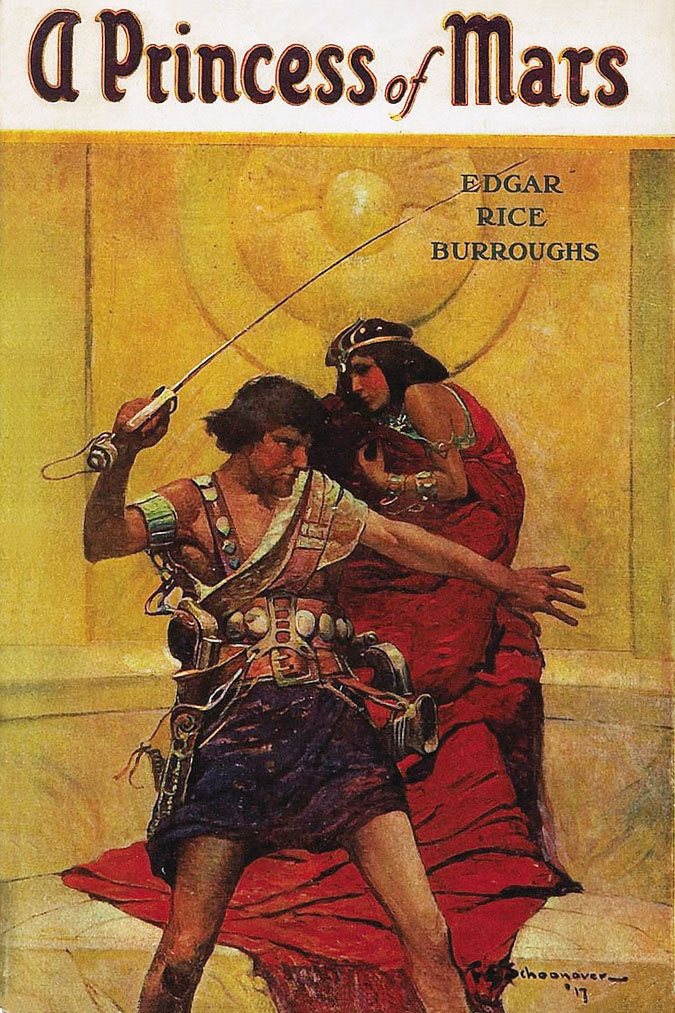
- John Carter and Dejah Thoris from the cover of the first edition of A Princess of Mars by Edgar Rice Burroughs, McClurg, 1917
- First appearance: A Princess of Mars
- Created by: Edgar Rice Burroughs
- Portrayed by: Traci Lords, Lynn Collins

In-universe information
- Species: Martian
- Gender: Female
- Title: Princess
- Spouse: John Carter
- Children: Carthoris, Tara
- Relatives: Mors Kajak (father), Tardos Mors (grandfather)

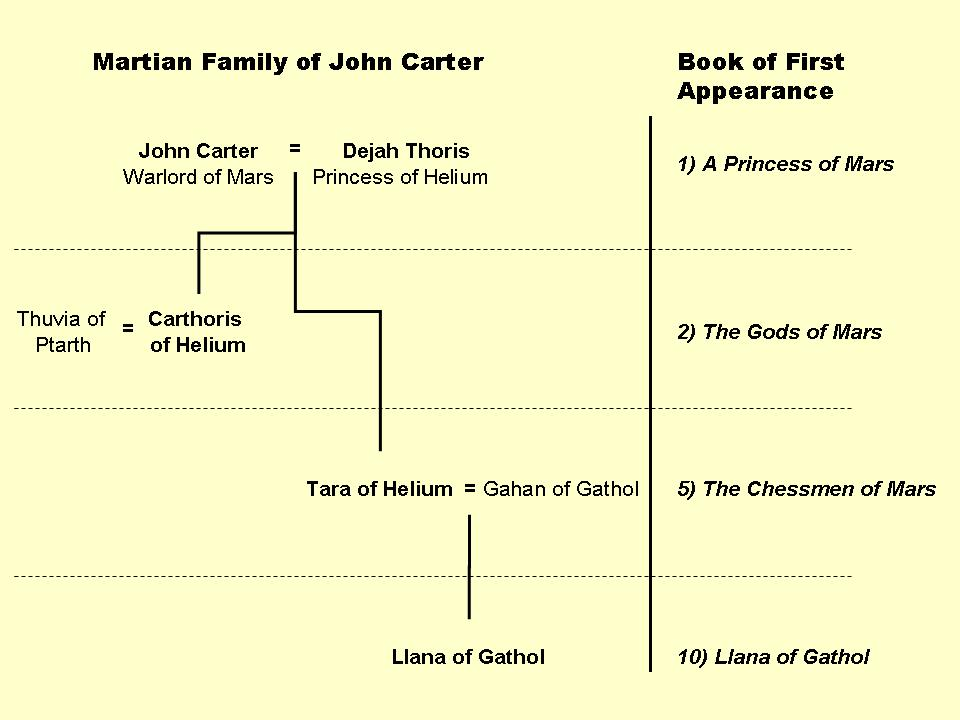
Dejah Thoris and John Carter's descendants

Dejah Thoris is a fictional character and princess of the Martian city-state/empire of Helium in Edgar Rice Burroughs' series of Martian novels. She is the daughter of Mors Kajak, Jed (chieftain) of Lesser Helium, and the granddaughter of Tardos Mors, Jeddak (overlord or high king) of Helium. She is the love interest and later the wife of John Carter, an Earthman mystically transported to Mars, and subsequently the mother of their son Carthoris and daughter Tara. She plays the role of the conventional damsel in distress who must be rescued from various perils, but is also portrayed as a competent and capable adventurer in her own right, fully capable of defending herself and surviving on her own in the wastelands of Mars.

== Description ==
Except for some jewelry, all of the planet's races seem to eschew clothing and look down upon Earth's inhabitants because they do wear clothing. As Burroughs describes Dejah Thoris:

And the sight which met my eyes was that of a slender, girlish figure, similar in every detail to the earthly women of my past life... Her face was oval and beautiful in the extreme, her every feature was finely chiseled and exquisite, her eyes large and lustrous and her head surmounted by a mass of coal black, waving hair, caught loosely into a strange yet becoming coiffure. Her skin was of a light reddish copper color, against which the crimson glow of her cheeks and the ruby of her beautifully molded lips shone with a strangely enhancing effect. She was as destitute of clothes as the green Martians who accompanied her; indeed, save for her highly wrought ornaments she was entirely naked, nor could any apparel have enhanced the beauty of her perfect and symmetrical figure.

== Publication history ==
Dejah Thoris first appeared as the title character in the initial Mars novel, A Princess of Mars (1917). Written between July and September 28, 1911, the novel was serialized as Under the Moons of Mars in the pulp magazine The All-Story from February to July 1912. It later appeared as a complete novel only after the success of Burroughs' Tarzan series. For its October 1917 hardcover publication by A.C. McClurg & Company, the novel was retitled A Princess of Mars.

She reappeared in subsequent volumes of the series, most prominently in the second, The Gods of Mars (1918), the third, The Warlord of Mars (1919), the eighth, Swords of Mars (1936), and the eleventh, John Carter of Mars (1964). Dejah Thoris is also mentioned or appeared in a minor role in other volumes of the series.

== Other media ==
=== Comics ===
Dejah Thoris has appeared in numerous adaptations of the Martian stories, such as in a 1995 storyline of Tarzan's Sundays comic strip and various comic book series featuring her husband John Carter. She is mentioned in the first issue of The League of Extraordinary Gentlemen, Volume II during a conversation between John Carter and Gullivar Jones.

She is a prominent character in Dynamite Entertainment's Warlord of Mars, based on A Princess of Mars. The Warworld comic from started in 2010 and ended in 2014 ending with 35 issues. Dejah first appears in issue 6. Dejah Thoris is also the main character of the Dynamite spinoff comic Warlord of Mars: Dejah Thoris, which ran 37 issues. Set 400 years before A Princess of Mars, the first story arc portrays Dejah's role in the rise to power of the Kingdom of Helium, as well as her first suitor. The second story arc will depict her as the "Pirate Queen of Mars", other story arcs are: "The Boora Witch", "The Pirate Men of Saturn", "The Rise of the Machine Men", "The Phantoms of Time", and "Duel to the Death". Each were collected into a trade paperback. The entire series is being collected into a series of omnibus volume, the first collecting the first 20 issues. There was also 2 other mini-series, the 4-issue Dejah Thoris and the White Apes of Mars (2012) and the 12-issue Dejah Thoris and the Green Men of Mars (2013–14). In the 2018 series Warriors of Mars, her mother is given as Princess Heru from Lieut. Gullivar Jones: His Vacation. A new series started in 2019 was written by Dan Abnett then it led to a sequel of that series called Dejah vs John Carter

A new series before she met John was announced in December 2022 and is set thousand years before John Carter.

Dejah Thoris is the name of a boat that Professor Xavier is seen on in Uncanny X-Men #98.

=== Other novels/short stories/games ===
In Pierce Brown's book Morning Star, Dejah Thoris is the name of a dreadnought battleship, which belongs to a character nicknamed Mustang.

Dr. Dejah Thoris "Deety" (for D.T.) Carter, née Burroughs, is a protagonist in Robert A. Heinlein's The Number of the Beast and The Pursuit of the Pankera. Burroughs's Dejah Thoris is also referred to in Heinlein's novel Glory Road by the protagonist when contemplating his female companion, Star.

In the story "Mars: The Home Front" by George Alec Effinger, Dejah Thoris is kidnapped by the sarmaks and taken to their space gun base. John Carter assembles a Barsoomian force to both rescue her and foil the sarmaks' plan to invade Jasoom.

In the earlier prequel short story "Allan and the Sundered Veil" by Alan Moore, a 'time lost' Carter sees a vision of himself fighting a Green Martian and winning Dejah Thoris in a "chrono-crystal aleph" (from Jorge Luis Borges's "The Aleph")

In The Apocalypse Troll by David Weber, Richard Aston refers to the very human-looking female he has rescued from a sinking UFO as Dejah Thoris.

In the Junot Díaz book The Brief Wondrous Life of Oscar Wao, Oscar describes a neighbor girl as being "so pretty she could have played young Dejah Thoris."

In L. Neil Smith's debut novel The Probability Broach, scientist Dr. Dora Jayne Thorens is a supporting character.

In the board game ANDROID, one of the six murder suspects, a human woman from the Mars colony, is named Dejah Thoris.

In Battle Angel Alita: Mars Chronicle, volume 7, page 37, one of the spaceships is name Dejah Thoris, in direct reference to the novels.

=== Films ===
Traci Lords portrayed Dejah Thoris in The Asylum's direct-to-DVD film Princess of Mars.

In the Disney film John Carter, released on March 9, 2012, she is played by Lynn Collins. In this version, she is the daughter of Tardos Mors, rather than his granddaughter, and is also Helium's leading scientist.

Dejah Thoris is the name of the "Belgium Witch of Marwencol" in the documentary Marwencol, which the film Welcome to Marwen is based upon, played by Diane Kruger.
