= John Carter of Mars =

Fictional character who appears in the Barsoom novels

John Carter
- Barsoom character
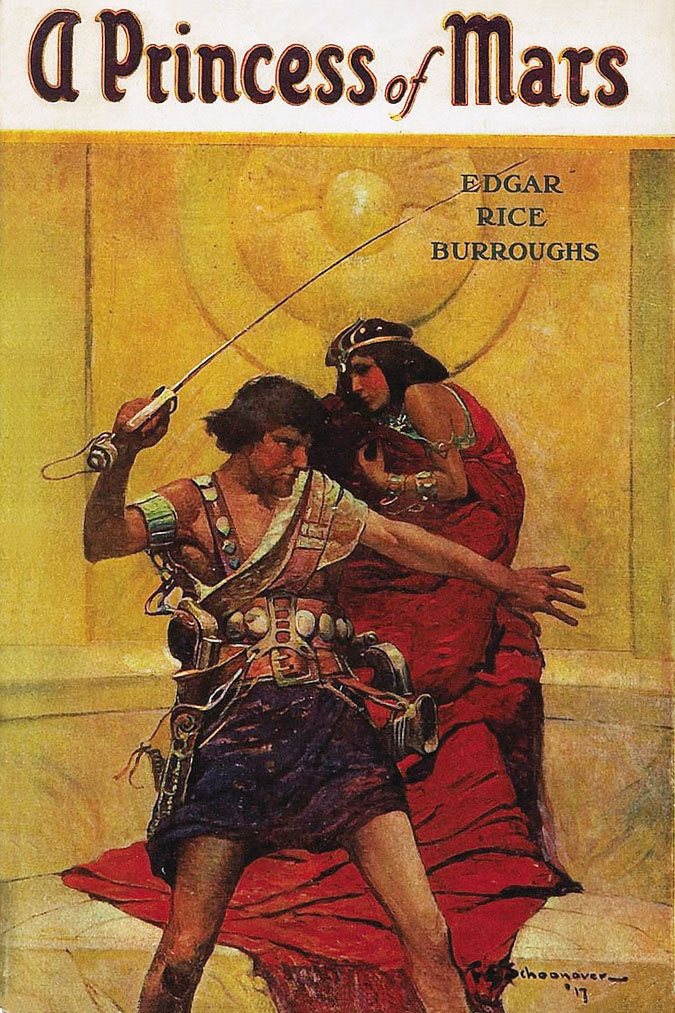
- John Carter and Dejah Thoris from the cover of the first edition of A Princess of Mars by Edgar Rice Burroughs, McClurg, 1917
- First appearance: A Princess of Mars
- Created by: Edgar Rice Burroughs
- Portrayed by: Antonio Sabato Jr. (Princess of Mars); Taylor Kitsch (John Carter)

In-universe information
- Alias: John Carter of Mars
- Gender: Male
- Occupation: Adventurer; Soldier
- Spouse: Dejah Thoris
- Children: Carthoris (son); Tara of Helium (daughter)
- Relatives: Mors Kajak (father in law), Tardos Mors (grandfather)
- Nationality: American

John Carter of Mars is the (initial) protagonist of the Barsoom stories by Edgar Rice Burroughs. A veteran of the American Civil War from Virginia, Carter is transported to the planet Mars, called Barsoom by its inhabitants. There, he becomes a warrior battling various mythological beasts, alien armies, and malevolent foes across Barsoom.

Created in 1911, John Carter became a major influence on early science fiction. The character has appeared in novels and short stories, comic books, television shows and films, including the 2012 feature film John Carter, which marked the 101st anniversary of the character's first appearance. The character is in the public domain, though the Edgar Rice Burroughs estate maintains some ownership around certain aspects of the character.

== Appearances ==
John Carter was the lead character in the first novel by Edgar Rice Burroughs, set on a fictionalized version of Mars known as Barsoom. Written between July and September 28, 1911, the novel was serialized as Under the Moons of Mars in the pulp magazine The All-Story from February to July 1912. It later appeared as a complete novel only after the success of Burroughs's Tarzan series. For its October 1917 hardcover publication by A.C. McClurg & Company, the novel was retitled A Princess of Mars.

Carter reappeared in subsequent volumes of the series, most prominently in the second (The Gods of Mars, 1918), the third (The Warlord of Mars, 1919), the eighth (Swords of Mars, 1936), the tenth (Llana of Gathol, 1948), and the eleventh and final installment (John Carter of Mars, published posthumously in 1964). John Carter is also a major secondary character in the fourth volume (Thuvia, Maid of Mars, 1920), and the ninth (Synthetic Men of Mars, 1940). In September 2021, Edgar Rice Burroughs, Inc. released John Carter Of Mars: Gods of the Forgotten, by Geary Gravel. Considered by some to be the 12th book in the Barsoom series, it is not widely accepted as such.

== Description ==
Carter stands 6 feet 2 inches (1.88 m) and has close-cropped black hair and steel-grey eyes. Burroughs describes him as immortal. In the opening pages of A Princess of Mars, it is revealed that Carter can remember no childhood, having always been a man of about thirty years old. Many generations have known him as "Uncle Jack," but he always lived to see them grow old and die, while he remained young.

His character and courtesy exemplify the ideals of the Antebellum South. A Virginian, he served as a captain in the American Civil War on the side of the Confederacy. After the war, Carter and his companion Powell, who was also a captain in the Civil War, became gold prospectors. Carter and Powell struck it rich by finding gold in Arizona. While hiding from Apaches in a cave, he appears to die; leaving his inanimate body behind, he is mysteriously transported by a form of astral projection to the planet Mars, where he finds himself re-embodied in a form identical to his earthly one. Accustomed to the greater gravity of Earth, he finds himself to be much stronger and more agile than the natives of Mars.

== Character biography ==
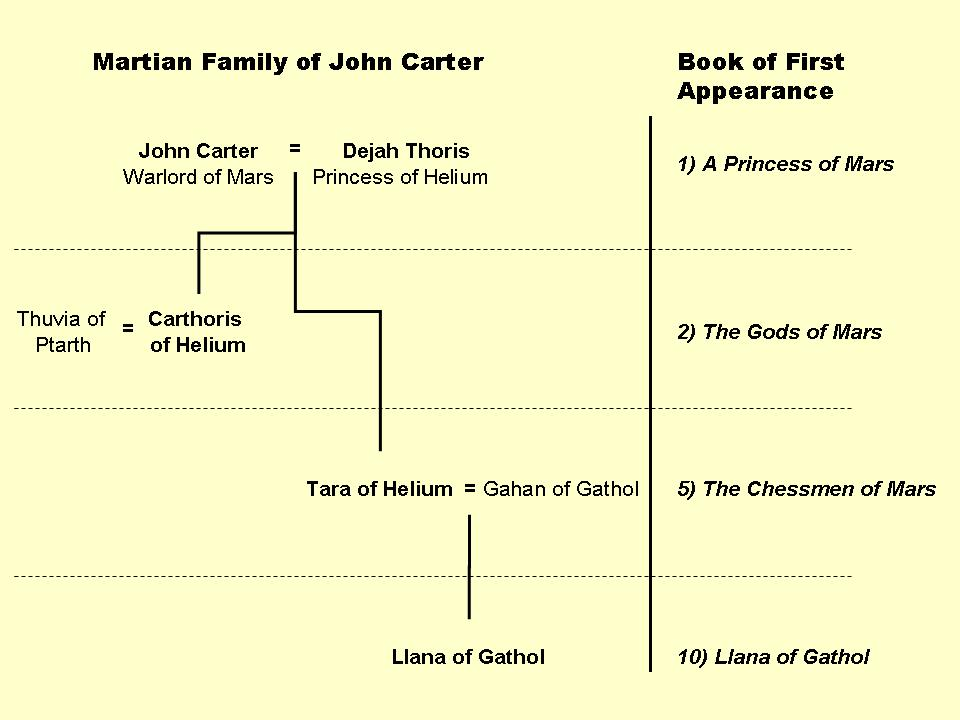
John Carter's descendants

On Mars, which its natives call Barsoom, Carter encounters both formidable alien creatures resembling the beasts of ancient myth, and various humanoids. He finds his true calling in life as a warlord who strives to save the planet's inhabitants. He wins the hand of a Martian princess, Dejah Thoris of Helium, but after several years of marriage he sacrifices himself to save Barsoom from the loss of its atmosphere. Awakening again after this second death he finds he has been miraculously transported back to Earth, into his original body. Carter then collects the wealth that resulted from his discovery of a rich vein of gold ore right before his original passage to Barsoom. Unable to return to Mars, he spends several more years in a small cottage on the Hudson River in New York, where he once more appears to die on March 4, 1886. In his first appearance, he refers to the fact that he does not actually know how old he is or when or where he was born. He further states that he has been a fighting man for a very long time, by implication far longer than a single human lifetime.

Again, Carter's apparent demise is not a true death; rather, he is restored to Barsoom, where after more adventures he rises to the position of Warlord of Mars, having played an instrumental role in creating alliances among many of the sentient races of Barsoom. He returns to Earth on a number of occasions afterward to relate his adventures to his nephew ("Burroughs"), revealing that he has mastered the process of astral travel between the two worlds. During his adventures on Mars his earthly body reposes in a special tomb that can only be opened from the inside.

John Carter and Dejah Thoris become the parents of a son, Carthoris, and daughter, Tara. Carthoris plays a secondary role in The Gods of Mars and The Warlord of Mars, and is the protagonist of Thuvia, Maid of Mars. Tara is the heroine of The Chessmen of Mars (1922), and the mother of Carter's granddaughter Llana, heroine of Llana of Gathol.

Only one other Earthman, Ulysses Paxton is able to travel to Mars via the method Carter used.

A complete list of characters is given at the end of Thuvia, Maid of Mars.

== In other media ==
=== Comics ===
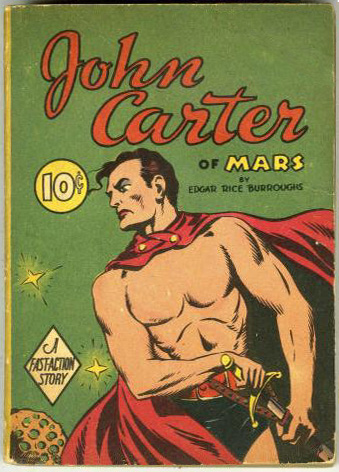
Dell Fast Action book, 1940

John Carter has appeared many times in short-lived comic strips and comic books, as well as in various Big Little Books of the 1930s and 1940s. In 1932, Burroughs tried to convince United Feature Syndicate, the distributors of the Tarzan comic strip, to also make an adaptation of John Carter; however the syndicate rejected the idea. In 1933, King Features Syndicate, wanting a science fiction strip to compete with the popular Buck Rogers, discussed a John Carter adaptation with Burroughs. Burroughs and the illustrator J. Allen St. John, expressed an interest in doing such a strip for King Features. However, Burroughs and King Features were unable to reach an agreement, and the syndicate decided to use an original strip—Flash Gordon by Alex Raymond—instead.

In 1941, United Feature agreed to the creation of a John Carter strip, hoping it would become as successful as Buck Rogers and Flash Gordon. The most notable John Carter comic adaptation to appear in Edgar Rice Burroughs's lifetime, John Carter of Mars was written and illustrated by Burroughs's son John Coleman Burroughs. This strip debuted on Sunday, December 7, 1941—the very day of the infamous Pearl Harbor Attack. This strip lasted only one year and four months, ending on April 18, 1943. Coleman Burroughs's strip was reprinted in book form by House of Greystoke in 1970.

Dell Comics released three issues of John Carter of Mars under its Four Color Comics anthology title. The issue numbers are 375, 437, and 488 and were released in 1952–1953. These were reprinted by Gold Key Comics (with different covers) in 1964.

Carter has appeared in various subsequent graphic adaptations of the Martian stories, notably the "John Carter of Mars" feature that ran in DC Comics' Tarzan and Weird Worlds comics from 1972 to 1973, and in Marvel Comics' John Carter, Warlord of Mars from 1977 to 1979.

He also appeared, along with Tarzan, in a 1994–1995 storyline of the Tarzan Sunday comic strip, and in Tarzan/John Carter: Warlords of Mars, a 1996 four-issue miniseries from Dark Horse Comics.

In 2010, Dynamite Entertainment published an ongoing series titled Warlord of Mars, written by Arvid Nelson. In 2011, Warlord of Mars: Dejah Thoris #1 debuted, also written by Nelson. He has since appearance in multiple Dejah Thoris comics and even had his own comics, and will have a new comic series.

SelfMadeHero are also adapting A Princess of Mars into a graphic novel, adapted by Ian Edginton with art by INJ Culbard.

Carter's physical appearances in the comics varied greatly from decade to decade. He was a frequent character in sketches and paintings by Frank Frazetta.

In 2023, Glénat Éditions published La Princesse de Mars - Tome 1, a graphic novel adaptation by Jean-David Morvan (script) and Francesco Biagini (art).

=== Other novels and television programs ===
Carter is also found in other novels and stories. He makes two appearances in Alan Moore's The League of Extraordinary Gentlemen. The first is in the story Allan and the Sundered Veil, which appears in the end of volume one. In this story, Moore claims that H. P. Lovecraft's Randolph Carter is the grandnephew of John Carter. Carter also appears in the beginning of volume two, helping the Barsoomians fight against the Martians from The War of the Worlds. The same scenario also appeared in the Burroughs entry in the War of the Worlds: Global Dispatches anthology. In addition, one of the protagonists of Robert A. Heinlein's The Number of the Beast is Captain Zebediah John Carter, whose lover becomes his wife Dejah Thoris "Deety" Burroughs Carter. The similarity in names is noted within the novel, since all of the major characters are fans of vintage science fiction. In Saturn's Children, by Charles Stross, Barsoom and Carter City are names of settlements on Mars. In Philip José Farmer's "World of Tiers" novels the moon circling the World of Tiers is modelled after Barsoom, from Edgar Rice Burroughs' novels, an homage which Farmer openly admits in the third book of the series. In Dan Simmon's Hyperion, when Fedmahn Kassad turned eighteen, he was offered the choice of serving at a Martian polar work camp or enlisting with the John Carter Brigade, a volunteer task force seeking to aid FORCE against the Glennon-Height Rebellion. In Harry Turtledove's Southern Victory series final novel, Settling Accounts: In at the Death, a character named John Carter of the "Tarkas" estate (a reference to Tars Tarkas, one of the green men of Mars), appears before a U.S. general after having protected African-Americans from the genocide taking place elsewhere.

The "object compass" in E. E. "Doc" Smith's Skylark series is very similar to the Barsoomian "destination compass" mentioned in the Mars series. Moreover, the Jandar of Callisto series by Lin Carter and the Dray Prescot series by Alan Burt Akers owe a great deal to Burroughs's Mars stories. In Stephen King's novella The Long Walk, a sarcastic reference is made by a Long-Walker - when asked his name, the character replies "My name is John Carter, my home is Barsoom, Mars". In Allan Howard's short story "It's a Small Solar System", originally published in Fantastic Universe (September 1957), the first explorers to land on Mars are welcomed by a man with a Southern accent: "Welcome to Barsoom! My name is John Carter." But as no one reads for pleasure on Earth anymore, the significance of this encounter is totally lost on the newcomers, and so ends the story.

Carter has also been referenced in television shows. In Zone of the Enders: Dolores, i, the protagonist, James Links, is always called "John Carter" by the WIRED officer, Baan Dorfloun. James Links is an Earth-born human who fell in love and had children with a Mars-born woman. In Episode 15 of the anime series To Love-Ru, a prince named Carter, from the planet Burroughs, arrives on Earth to conduct a hunt in a hidden alien game preserve in Guyana. In the Babylon 5 episode "Spider in the Web", John Carter is mentioned as the pilot of the first colony ship to Mars. In "Secret Origins", the pilot episode of the cartoon TV series Justice League, the first US astronaut on Mars is named J. Allen Carter. Carter sets up Earth for invasion by the Mars-based "Imperium", which had wiped out the native Martian population, except for sole survivor J'onn J'onzz, aka Martian Manhunter.

In January 2020, Altus Press released Tarzan: Conqueror of Mars by Will Murray, an authorized Tarzan novel in which Tarzan finds himself marooned on Barsoom and seeks John Carter's help to return home.

In July 2026, Edgar Rice Burroughs Inc. announced that an animated series titled John Carter, Warlord of Mars: The Animated Series was in the works, with Mark Andrews and Michael Kogge as showrunners.

=== Influence on later works ===
John Carter of Mars was a major influence on other science fiction/fantasy tales and characters through the 20th century, including Buck Rogers, Flash Gordon, Superman, Adam Strange, Dune, Warp!, Den, and Star Wars to name just a few.

The movie Avatar was inspired by John Carter of Mars. According to Avatar's creator, James Cameron, "With Avatar, I thought, Forget all these chick flicks and do a classic guys' adventure movie, something in the Edgar Rice Burroughs mold, like John Carter of Mars – a soldier goes to Mars."

In the first chapters of Gore Vidal's novel Washington, D.C. (1967), the character Peter Sanford – aged 16 at the outset of the plot – indulges in vivid and detailed fantasies of being John Carter, and adds explicit erotic scenes not appearing in the original Burroughs books.

In The Number Of The Beast, by Robert Heinlein, two of the main characters are inspired by the John Carter series. One is actually a reserve captain from Virginia named Zebadiah John Carter and his (soon to be) bride is named Deejah Thoris (Deety) Burroughs. They use technology to skip to various worlds, and end up meeting Lazarus Long.

=== Film adaptations ===
Bob Clampett, who was best known for his work on the Looney Tunes shorts at Warner Bros., wanted to produce a full-length cartoon series of John Carter in 1936 and talked with Burroughs about it. Burroughs contacted Metro-Goldwyn-Mayer about buying the series, but ultimately declined after sales representatives expressed concern that the project would be a "tough sale", and that audiences would not understand the concept. Several seconds of animation appear in the supplemental material of the home-video version of the Disney film.

John Carter was played by Antonio Sabàto Jr. in the 2009 film Princess of Mars, which also starred Traci Lords as Princess Dejah Thoris.

In the 2012 Disney film adaptation of the series, John Carter, Carter is played by Taylor Kitsch, with the role of Dejah Thoris played by Lynn Collins.

=== Games ===
The John Carter, Warlord of Mars role-playing game was published by Heritage Models in 1978. In 2015, British company Modiphius Entertainment acquired a John Carter license, announcing plans to put out a new John Carter role-playing game, miniatures and a board game in 2016.
