= The All-Story Magazine =

American pulp magazine (1905–1920)

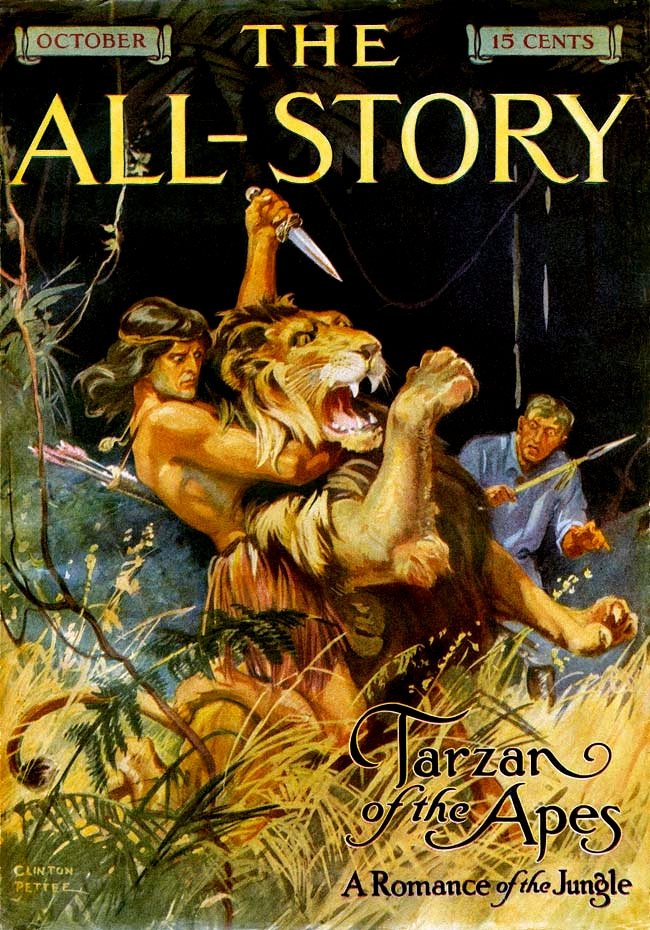
- The October 1912 issue of All-Story, containing the first Tarzan story. The artist is Clinton Pettee.
- Editor: Robert H. Davis
- Categories: Pulp magazine
- Publisher: Frank Munsey
- First issue: January 1905
- Final issue: July 17, 1920
- Country: United States

The All-Story Magazine was a pulp magazine founded in 1905 and published by Frank Munsey. The editor was Robert H. Davis; Thomas Newell Metcalf also worked as a managing editor (Note: A managing editor is typically responsible for the daily operations of a publication.) for the magazine. It was published monthly until March 1914, and then switched to a weekly schedule. Munsey merged it with The Cavalier, another of his pulp magazines, in May 1914, and the title changed to All-Story Cavalier Weekly for a year. In 1920, it was merged with Munsey's Argosy; the combined magazine was retitled Argosy All-Story Weekly.

Many well-known writers appeared in All-Story, including the mystery writer Mary Roberts Rinehart and the Western writer Max Brand. The magazine's most famous contributor was Edgar Rice Burroughs, whose first sale, Under the Moons of Mars, appeared in All-Story in 1912. This was the start of his Barsoom science fiction series set on Mars; the next three novels in the series also appeared in All-Story. In 1912, All-Story printed Burroughs's Tarzan of the Apes, and more stories of Tarzan followed, along with two installments of another of Burroughs's series, about Pellucidar, a land inside the Earth. The first appearance of Zorro, the vigilante, was in All-Story in 1919, in Johnston McCulley's novel The Curse of Capistrano. Many other science fiction and fantasy stories appeared over the life of the magazine. Starting in 1939, some of the stories from All-Story were included in Famous Fantastic Mysteries and Fantastic Novels, both of which were created as vehicles for reprints from the Munsey magazines.

== Publication history ==
Issue data for All-Story from 1905 to 1914
	Jan	Feb	Mar	Apr	May	Jun	Jul	Aug	Sep	Oct	Nov	Dec
1905	1/1	1/2	1/3	1/4	2/1	2/2	2/3	2/4	3/1	3/2	3/3	3/4
1906	4/1	4/2	4/3	4/4	5/1	5/2	5/3	5/4	6/1	6/2	6/3	6/4
1907	7/1	7/2	7/3	7/4	8/1	8/2	8/3	8/4	9/1	9/2	9/3	9/4
1908	10/1	10/2	10/3	10/4	11/1	11/2	11/3	11/4	12/1	12/2	12/3	12/4
1909	13/1	13/2	13/3	13/4	14/1	14/2	14/3	14/4	15/1	15/2	15/3	15/4
1910	16/1	16/2	16/3	16/4	17/1	17/2	17/3	17/4	18/1	18/2	18/3	18/4
1911	19/1	19/2	19/3	19/4	20/1	20/2	20/3	20/4	21/1	21/2	21/3	21/4
1912	22/1	22/2	22/3	22/4	23/1	23/2	23/3	23/4	24/1	24/2	24/3	24/4
1913	25/1	25/2	25/3	25/4	26/1	26/2	26/3	26/4	27/1	27/2	27/3	27/4
1914	28/1	28/2	28/3									
Robert H. Davis

In 1882, Frank Munsey launched The Golden Argosy, a children's weekly magazine. The title changed to just The Argosy in 1888, and in 1896, Munsey switched to using coarse pulp paper, and printing only fiction, thus launching the first pulp magazine. It was immediately successful. Other publishers brought out competing magazines, such as Street & Smith's The Popular Magazine in 1903, and Story-Press's The Monthly Story Magazine in 1905. As the competition grew, Munsey decided to add another pulp title.

Munsey launched The All-Story Magazine in January 1905 on a monthly schedule with Robert H. Davis as the editor, and Davis hired Thomas Newell Metcalf to work for him as managing editor. Munsey had hired Davis early in 1904 to work on the New York Sunday News, but sold it in April of that year, and Davis had been fiction editor of Munsey's Magazine since then.

In March 1914 All-Story's schedule switched to weekly, and in May of that year it was combined with another Munsey pulp, The Cavalier, under the title All-Story Cavalier Weekly. Davis and Metcalf had each dealt with some All-Story contributors up to that point, but thereafter Davis took over working with the writers who had been Metcalf's responsibility. The following year the "Cavalier" was dropped, and it continued as All-Story Weekly again until 1920, when it was merged into The Argosy. The combined magazine was retitled Argosy All-Story Weekly, and retained that name until 1929.

== Contents and reception ==
Issue data for All-Story from 1914 to 1920
		January	February	March	April	May	June	July	August	September	October	November	December
1914	Dates:			7,14,21,28	4,11,18,25	2,9,16,23,30	6,13,20,27	4,11,18,25	1,8,15,22,29	5,12,19,26	3,10,17,24,31	7,14,21,28	5,12,19,26
1914	Volume:			29/1 to 29/4	30/1 to 30/4	31/1 to 32/3	32/4 to 33/3	33/4 to 34/3	34/4 to 35/4	36/1 to 36/4	37/1 to 38/1	38/2 to 39/1	39/2 to 40/1
1915	Dates:	2,9,16,23,30	6,13,20,27	6,13,20,27	3,10,17,24	1,8,15,22,29	5,12,19,26	3,10,17,24,31	7,14,21,28	4,11,18,25	2,9,16,23,30	6,13,20,27	4,11,18,25
1915	Volume:	40/2 to 41/2	41/3 to 42/2	42/3 to 43/2	43/3 to 44/2	44/3 to 45/3	45/4 to 46/3	46/4 to 47/4	48/1 to 48/4	49/1 to 49/4	50/1 to 51/1	51/2 to 52/1	52/2 to 53/1
1916	Dates:	1,8,15,22,29	5,12,19,26	4,11,18,25	1,8,15,22,29	6,13,20,27	3,10,17,24	1,8,15,22,29	5,12,19,26	2,9,16,23,30	7,14,21,28	4,11,18,25	2,9,16,23,30
1916	Volume:	53/2 to 54/2	54/3 to 55/2	55/3 to 56/2	56/3 to 57/3	57/4 to 58/3	58/4 to 59/3	59/4 to 60/4	61/1 to 61/4	62/1 to 63/1	63/2 to 64/1	64/2 to 65/1	65/2 to 66/2
1917	Dates:	6,13,20,27	3,10,17,24	3,10,17,24,31	7,14,21,28	5,12,19,26	2,9,16,23,30	7,14,21,28	4,11,18,25	1,8,15,22,29	6,13,20,27	3,10,17,24	1,8,15,22,29
1917	Volume:	66/3 to 67/2	67/3 to 68/2	68/3 to 69/3	69/4 to 70/3	70/4 to 71/3	71/4 to 72/4	73/1 to 73/4	74/1 to 74/4	75/1 to 76/1	76/2 to 77/1	77/2 to 78/1	78/2 to 79/2
1918	Dates:	5,12,19,26	2,9,16,23	2,9,16,23,30	6,13,20,27	4,11,18,25	1,8,15,22,29	6,13,20,27	3,10,17,24,31	7,14,21,28	5,12,19,26	2,9,16,23,30	7,14,21,28
1918	Volume:	79/3 to 80/2	80/3 to 81/2	81/3 to 82/3	82/4 to 83/3	83/4 to 84/3	84/4 to 85/4	86/1 to 86/4	87/1 to 88/1	88/2 to 89/1	89/2 to 90/1	90/2 to 91/2	91/3 to 92/2
1919	Dates:	4,11,18,25	1,8,15,22	1,8,15,22,29	5,12,19,26	3,10,17,24,31	7,14,21,28	5,12,19,26	2,9,16,23,30	6,13,20,27	4,11,18,25	1,8,15,22,29	6,13,20,27
1919	Volume:	92/3 to 93/2	93/3 to 94/2	94/3 to 95/3	95/4 to 96/3	96/4 to 97/4	98/1 to 98/4	99/1 to 99/4	100/1 to 101/1	101/2 to 102/1	102/2 to 103/1	103/2 to 104/2	104/3 to 105/2
1920	Dates:	3,10,17,24,31	7,14,21,28	6,13,20,27	3,10,17,24	1,8,15,22,29	5,12,19,26	3,10,17					
1920	Volume:	105/3 to 106/3	106/4 to 107/3	107/4 to 108/3	108/4 to 109/3	109/4 to 110/4	111/1 to 111/4	112/1 to 112/3					
Robert H. Davis

The first issue included the first instalments of five novels, one of which was W. Bert Foster's When Time Slipped a Cog, about a man who discovers a year of his life has passed that he cannot remember. Two of the short stories were science fiction as well: Howard R. Garis's "The Ghost at Box 13", and Margaret Prescott Montague's "The Great Sleep Tanks". The May issue reprinted Garrett P. Serviss's short novel The Moon Metal (originally published in book form in 1900), about a new fiscal standard that replaced gold with a metal from the moon. Serviss also appeared in 1909 with A Columbus of Space, serialized in the January to June issues, which science fiction historian Sam Moskowitz commented "caused some to class Serviss as the equal of Jules Verne".

Mary Roberts Rinehart's first story, "A Gasoline Road Agent", appeared in the April 1905 issue. Davis encouraged her efforts, and her first novel, The Circular Staircase, was serialized in All-Story from November 1906 to March 1907. In book form the novel later became the first major success of her career. Max Brand, one of the most prolific of all pulp writers, sold his first Western novel, The Untamed, to All-Story; it was serialized starting in the December 1918 issue. Ray Cummings, another prolific pulp author, began his career with "The Girl in the Golden Atom" in the March 15, 1919, issue of All-Story; it was one of the most popular stories he ever wrote. Other All-Story writers included Rex Stout, later a well-known mystery writer; Western writer Raymond S. Spears; science fiction writer Murray Leinster; horror and fantasy writers Tod Robbins and Perley Poore Sheehan, and W. Adolphe Roberts, a Jamaican writer who later became a leader of Jamaica's independence movement. All-Story also published poetry, including work by Djuna Barnes, later known as an important figure in modernist and lesbian literature. Eldred Kurtz Means's "Tickfall" stories, about black Americans in Louisiana, began in Cavalier and moved to All-Story when the two magazines merged. Johnston McCulley's Zorro series began with the serialization of The Curse of Capistrano in August and September 1919, and continued in Argosy after the magazines merged in 1920. Edwin Baird, later the founding editor of Weird Tales, made his first sale to All-Story in 1906, and contributed several more over the life of the magazine.

The first issue's cover printed the words "Something New" in a script font on a red background. A picture of two cowboys appeared on the next issue. The third issue took over the cover for a declaration that the magazine had reached a circulation of 200,000, but thereafter artwork was used on every cover. Artists included Valentine Sandberg and F. X. Chamberlain. The cover illustrations did not at first have any relationship to the stories in the magazine.

John Clute, discussing the American pulp magazines in the first two decades of the twentieth century, has described All-Story and its companion, Argosy, as "the most important pulps of their era."

=== Burroughs ===
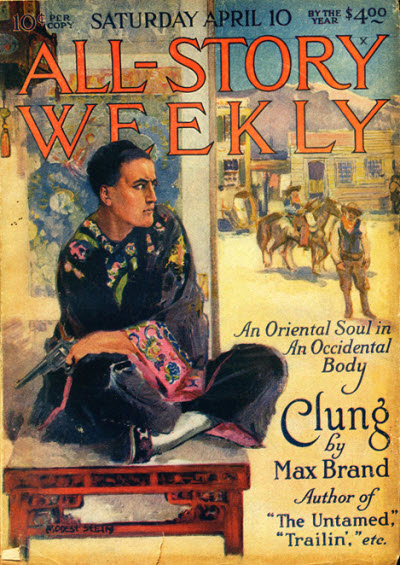
The cover of the April 10, 1920 issue; cover art by Modest Stein

The most important author discovered by All-Story was Edgar Rice Burroughs. Burroughs was thirty-five years old in the summer of 1911, and unsuccessful in business. He began writing a novel in July of that year, "very surreptitiously" as he later recalled: "I was very much ashamed of my new vocation ... It seemed a foolish thing for a full grown man to be doing". By August he had completed enough of the story to send it to All-Story under the title "Dejah Thoris, Martian Princess", adding in his covering letter that the completed story would be three times the length of the 43,000 words he was submitting. Metcalf replied with guarded enthusiasm, asking for some cuts, and a total length of no more than 70,000 words. Metcalf bought the rewritten story in November for $400 (equivalent to $14,000 in 2025); given that the manuscript had taken four months of work, Burroughs was unimpressed at the pay rate. The story was serialized in All-Story from February to July 1912, titled Under the Moons of Mars. This was the first of Burroughs's Barsoom stories ("Barsoom" being the name of the planet Mars in the series), an early and influential planetary romance. Darkness and Dawn, by George Allan England, had been serialized in another Munsey magazine, The Cavalier, starting in January that year, and science fiction historian Sam Moskowitz regards the appearance of these two stories as signalling the start of an era of popular science fiction love stories. Burroughs had intended the story to be printed under the pseudonym "Normal Bean", to indicate he was an ordinary person despite the fantastic nature of the story. The typesetter assumed it was an error and the story appeared as by "Norman Bean", leading Burroughs to give up the pseudonym and publish his subsequent work under his real name. (Note: When the sequel, The Gods of Mars, appeared, one reader wrote to All-Story to complain that the new writer, Burroughs, had not "continued the story the way the original author would have done".)

Burroughs's next submission to Metcalf was rejected, but in March 1912 Burroughs sent Metcalf a description of the novel he was working on, titled Tarzan of the Apes; Metcalf was enthusiastic about the idea and promptly bought the manuscript when Burroughs submitted it in June. It appeared in the October 1912 issue of All-Story. The next three Barsoom novels appeared in All-Story over the next four years: The Gods of Mars was serialized from January to May 1913; The Warlord of Mars ran from December 1913 to March 1914, and Thuvia, Maid of Mars appeared in 1916. The second Tarzan book, The Return of Tarzan, appeared in New Story Magazine, but the series returned to All-Story for three of the later novels: The Beasts of Tarzan, The Son of Tarzan, and Tarzan and the Jewels of Opar, and for some of the subsequent short stories in the series. Burroughs's Pellucidar series, about adventures inside a hollow Earth, also began in All-Story, with At the Earth's Core and Pellucidar. The initial rate of less than a cent per word that Burroughs received for his first sale began to increase: Metcalf agreed to a rate of two and a half cents per word (equivalent to $0.80 in 2025), for everything he bought from Burroughs in 1914.

By the time All-Story merged with Argosy in the summer of 1920, almost two dozen stories and serialized novels by Burroughs had appeared in the magazine. Burroughs's popularity led to a demand for similar stories, and to imitations. Science fiction historian Mike Ashley suggests that this was the reason for the increasing number of science fiction stories that began to appear, from writers such as Austin Hall, Homer Eon Flint, and Junius B. Smith. Hall's "Almost Immortal" appeared in 1916, along with short science fiction tales by John U. Giesy, J. B. Smith, Charles B. Stilson, and Victor Rousseau. The following year All-Story published Abraham Merritt's first story, "Through the Dragon Glass". Merritt was one of the most popular pulp writers, and in 1918 two more of his stories appeared: The People of the Pit, and "The Moon Pool". "The Conquest of the Moon Pool", a sequel to the latter story, followed in 1919, and both were well received. When Hugo Gernsback launched Amazing Stories, the first science fiction magazine, in 1926, he soon discovered that the technically oriented science fiction he preferred did not sell as well as more fantastic stories, and he responded by reprinting "The Moon Pool" in the May 1927 issue.

In 2006, a copy of the October 1912 issue of All-Story, featuring the first appearance of the character Tarzan in any medium, sold for $59,750 (equivalent to $95,000 in 2025) in an auction held by Heritage Auctions of Dallas.

== Bibliographic details ==
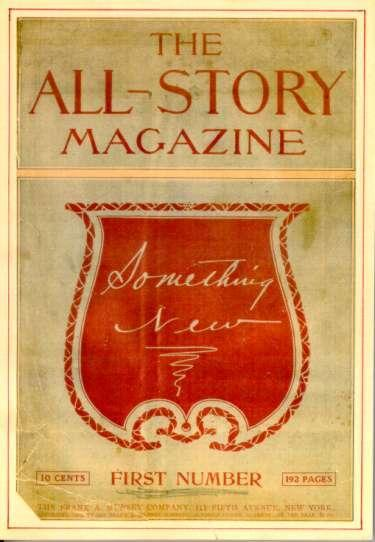
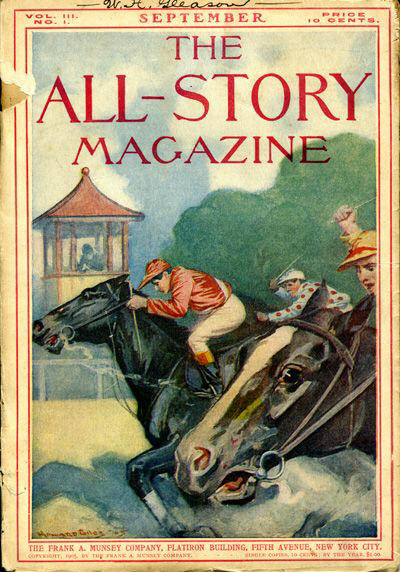
The first issue, dated January 1905, and a later issue, from the period when the covers did not relate to the stories in the magazine

The magazine's title was originally The All-Story Magazine. This was shortened to The All-Story in June 1911, and then changed to All-Story Weekly when it switched from monthly to weekly publication with the March 7, 1914, issue. From May 16, 1914, to May 8, 1915, it was titled All-Story Cavalier Weekly as a result of the merger with The Cavalier, and for the rest of its run, until the July 17, 1920, issue, it was All-Story Weekly again.

In 1929 Munsey's reorganized two of their magazines: Munsey's Magazine became part of a new love story magazine titled All-Story, and Argosy All-Story Weekly became simply Argosy. The new All-Story was soon retitled All-Story Love Stories and continued publication until 1955.

=== Reprint magazines and anthologies ===
The long history of the Munsey magazines meant that by the 1930s there were many stories readers had heard of but could no longer obtain. In response to reader requests, Munsey's launched Famous Fantastic Mysteries in 1939 to reprint old stories from both Argosy and All-Story Weekly. The following year Munsey's launched Fantastic Novels, another reprint magazine, to make longer stories available without needing to serialize them in Famous Fantastic Mysteries. Fantastic Novels only lasted five issues before being discontinued in 1941, but Famous Fantastic Mysteries lasted for 81 issues, ceasing publication with the June 1953 issue. Popular Publications, which had acquired Famous Fantastic Mysteries from Munsey's in 1942, brought back Fantastic Novels for another 20 issues between 1948 and 1951.

In 1970 Sam Moskowitz edited a collection of stories from the Munsey magazines titled Under the Moons of Mars: A History and Anthology of "The Scientific Romance" in the Munsey Magazines, 1912–1920. Seven of the nine stories included had originally appeared in All-Story.

== Sources ==
- Ashley, Michael (1976) [1974]. "Introduction: An Amazing Experiment". In Ashley, Michael (ed.). The History of the Science Fiction Magazine: Volume 1: 1926–1935. Westport, Connecticut: Henry Regnery Company. pp. 11–51. ISBN 0-8092-8003-5.
- Ashley, Mike (1985). "The Argosy and All-Story". In Tymn, Marshall B.; Ashley, Mike (eds.). Science Fiction, Fantasy, and Weird Fiction Magazines. Westport, Connecticut: Greenwood Press. pp. 103–109. ISBN 0-313-21221-X.
- Clareson, Thomas D. (1985a). "Famous Fantastic Mysteries". In Tymn, Marshall B. & Ashley, Mike (eds.). Science Fiction, Fantasy and Weird Fiction Magazines. Westport, Connecticut: Greenwood Press. pp. 211–216. ISBN 0-313-21221-X.
- Clareson, Thomas D. (1985b). "Fantastic Novels". In Tymn, Marshall B. & Ashley, Mike (eds.). Science Fiction, Fantasy and Weird Fiction Magazines. Westport, Connecticut: Greenwood Press. pp. 241–244. ISBN 0-313-21221-X.
- Clute, John (1995). Science Fiction: The Illustrated Encyclopedia. New York: Dorling Kindersley Publishing, Inc. ISBN 0-7894-0185-1.
- Drew, Bernard A. (2015). Black Stereotypes in Popular Series Fiction, 1851–1955: Jim Crow Era Authors and Their Characters. McFarland, Incorporated, Publishers. ISBN 978-0-7864-7410-3 – via Google Books.
- Earle, David M. (2009). Re-Covering Modernism: Pulps, Paperbacks and the Prejudice of Form. Farnham, Surrey: Ashgate Publishing. ISBN 978-0-7546-6154-2.
- Hulse, Ed (2013). The Blood 'N' Thunder Guide to Pulp Fiction. Morris Plains, New Jersey: Murania Press. ISBN 978-1491010938.
- Locke, John (2007). Pulpwood Days Volume 1: Editors You Want to Know. Elkhorn, California: Off-Trail Publications. ISBN 978-0-9786836-2-7.
- Miller, Meredith (2006). Historical Dictionary of Lesbian Literature. Lanham, Maryland: The Scarecrow Press, Inc. ISBN 0-8108-4941-0.
- Moskowitz, Sam (1968). "Introduction: A History of Science Fiction in the Popular Magazines, 1891–1911". In Moskowitz, Sam (ed.). Science Fiction by Gaslight: A History and Anthology of Science Fiction in the Popular Magazines, 1891–1911. Cleveland, Ohio: The World Publishing Company. pp. 15–50. OCLC 1330798369.
- Moskowitz, Sam (1970). "A History of the Scientific Romance in the Munsey Magazines, 1912-1920". In Moskowitz, Sam (ed.). Under the Moons of Mars: A History and Anthology of the Scientific Romance in the Munsey Magazines, 1912–1920. New York: Holt, Rinehart and Winston. pp. 289–433. ISBN 0-03-081858-3.
- Parsons, Deborah (2007). "Djuna Barnes: melancholic modernism". In Shiach, Morag (ed.). The Cambridge Companion to the Modernist Novel. Cambridge: Cambridge University Press. pp. 165–177. ISBN 978-0-521-85444-3.
- Porges, Irwin (1975). Edgar Rice Burroughs: The Man Who Created Tarzan. Provo, Utah: Brigham Young University Press. ISBN 0-8425-0079-0.
- Server, Lee (2002). Encyclopedia of Pulp Fiction Writers. New York: Checkmark Books. ISBN 0-8160-4578-X.
- Stableford, Brian (1997). "Merritt, Abraham". In Clute, John; Grant, John (eds.). The Encyclopedia of Fantasy. New York: St. Martin's Press. pp. 103–109. ISBN 0-312-15897-1.
- Sumner, David E.; Rhoades, Shirrel (2006). Magazines: A Complete Guide to the Industry. New York: Peter Lang. ISBN 0-8204-7617-X.
