= The Pursuit of the Pankera =

2020 novel by Robert A. Heinlein

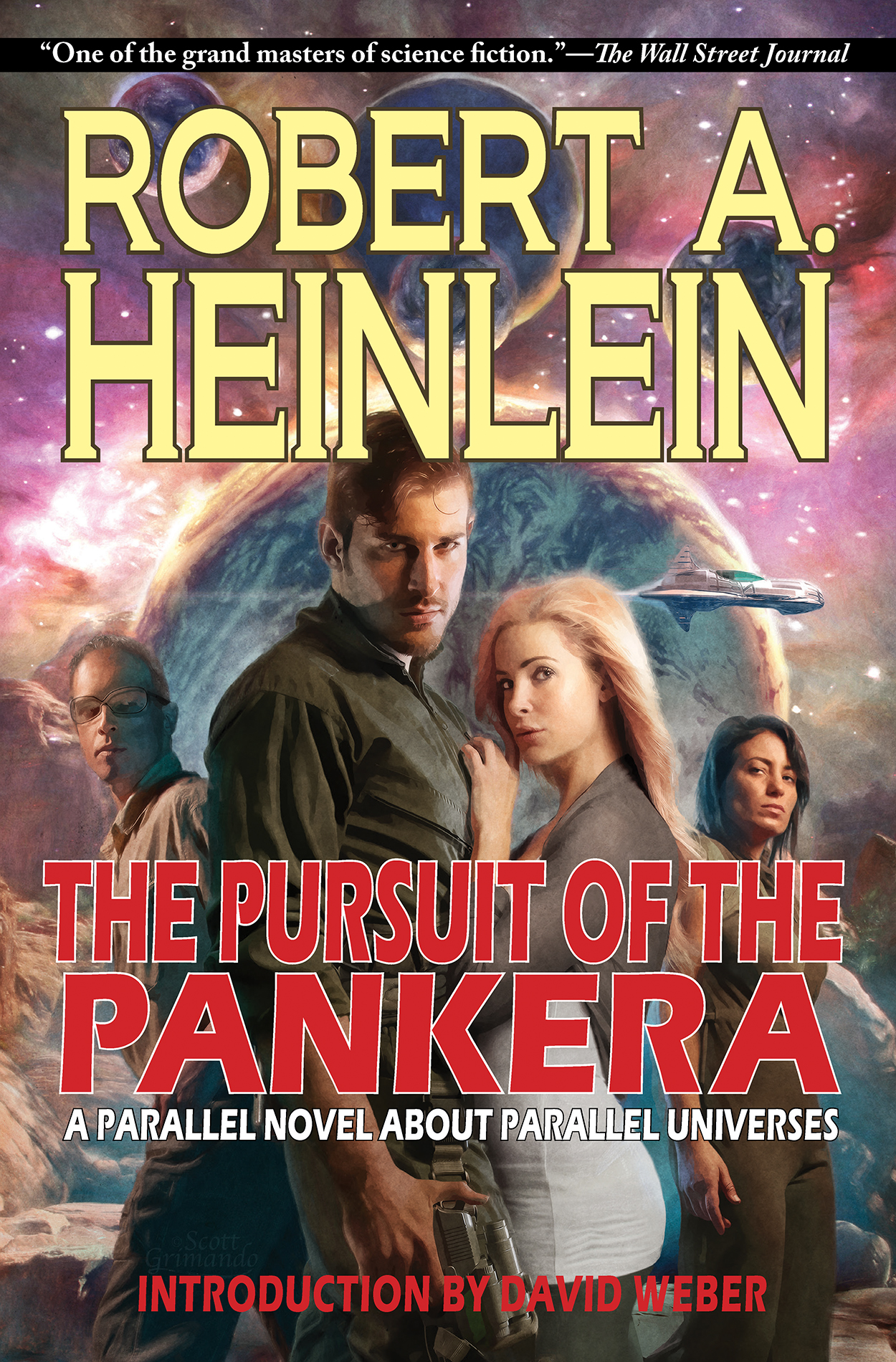
- First edition
- Author: Robert A. Heinlein
- Cover artist: Scott Grimando
- Language: English
- Genre: Science fiction
- Publisher: Caezik SF & Fantasy
- Publication date: March 24, 2020
- Publication place: United States
- Media type: Print, eBook
- ISBN: 9781647100018

The Pursuit of the Pankera is a science fiction novel by American writer Robert A. Heinlein, published in 2020 based on a rediscovered manuscript. As such it is the last published work by Heinlein.

== History ==
The Number of the Beast was published as a novel in 1980 after appearing in Omni magazine the year before. However, an earlier version or variant of the book, fully written, was never published. It is unclear why the other text was never published but many theories have been put forth, including the idea that Virginia Heinlein was dissatisfied with the manuscript and the idea that there were significant copyright issues.

Both The Number of the Beast and this other variant took liberties with characters and settings created by other authors, in particular with E. E. Smith's Lensman series and Edgar Rice Burroughs' Barsoom series. This variant of the book was never published and the original manuscript only survived in fragments, primarily in academic institutions.

Shahid Mahmud, owner of Arc Manor publishing house, secured the US rights to publish this variant, originally titled by Arc Manor as 666 as a reference to the sister novel The Number of the Beast. This title was eventually changed to The Pursuit of the Pankera, a direct reference to the book's plot, which concerns itself with the pursuit of the alien race known as the Pankera. The novel was published in March 2020 by Arc Manor's flagship imprint, Caezik SF & Fantasy, with permission from the estates of both Edgar Rice Burroughs and E.E. Doc Smith.

== Plot ==
The novel revolves around four main characters: Zebadiah Carter, Dejah Thoris "Deety" Burroughs, her father Jacob Burroughs, and Hilda Corners. They use a specially equipped vehicle, the "Gay Deceiver," capable of traveling through different parallel universes in a multiverse.

The story begins with the group escaping an assassination attempt by jumping to an alternate universe. The attack appears connected to Jacob's invention that facilitates their universe-hopping ability. The group, realizing they are being targeted, uses the "Gay Deceiver" to flee across multiple universes to elude their unknown assailants.

As they navigate through various parallel Earths, each with its unique characteristics and challenges, they encounter different versions of themselves and familiar figures from their own world, leading to confusing and complex interactions.

Their journey to understand who is behind the attacks and why leads them deeper into a web of multiverse intrigue. They discover that the motive behind the assassination attempts is tied to control over the technology that enables interdimensional travel.

The climax of the novel occurs when the group confronts the main antagonist in one of the parallel universes. They engage in a battle of wits and technology to stop the villain's plan, which threatens the stability of multiple universes.

The resolution sees the group successfully thwarting the antagonist, securing their safety and the safety of the dimensions they've traveled. They return to their original universe, more aware of the vast possibilities and dangers of multiverse travel.

== Parallels with The Number of the Beast ==
Since the texts of both The Number of the Beast and The Pursuit of the Pankera diverge precisely as the four main characters make their first jump to a parallel universe, they can be considered parallel books about parallel universes, with interwoven characters and storylines. A reprint of The Number of the Beast was published as a set with The Pursuit of the Pankera, with matching artwork by Scott Grimando. Both books start off the same for the first one third of the book. After the first third, the books diverge completely. The Number of the Beast generally ignores the alien Pankera and focuses on a series of strange events experienced by the main characters.

Heinlein enthusiast David Potter explained on alt.fan.heinlein, in a posting reprinted on the Heinlein Society website, that the entirety of The Number of the Beast is actually "one of the greatest textbooks on narrative fiction ever produced, with a truly magnificent set of examples of how not to do it right there in the foreground, and constant explanations of how to do it right, with literary references to people and books that did do it right, in the background." He noted that "every single time there's a boring lecture or tedious character interaction going on in the foreground, there's an example of how to do it right in the background."

== Literary significance and reception ==
The book was published to generally positive reviews. However, Publishers Weekly considered it to be somewhat dated by modern standards while commenting on it being a "fascinating window into Heinlein's creative process." Midwest Book Review called it an "extraordinary work of science fiction," and it was a Locus Magazine national bestseller.

Noted science fiction historian and critic Farah Menhelsohn wrote that she was keen to read the book: "Heinlein mined so much of his material from older books, and rethought so many of his ideas at different points, that this book could be a real contribution to understanding his internal grand narrative."

Jack Kirwan wrote in National Review that the novel is "about two men and two women in a time machine safari through this and other universes. But describing The Number of the Beast thus is like saying Moby Dick is about a one-legged guy trying to catch a fish." He went on to state that Heinlein celebrates the "competent person".
