= The Scrap Book and The Cavalier =

Magazines published between 1906 and 1914

The Scrap Book and The Cavalier were related American magazines published between 1906 and 1914 by the Frank A. Munsey Company.

The Scrap Book was launched in 1906, and after a year split into two sections, both titled The Scrap Book, and published on the same schedule, so that from July 1907 to September 1908 there were two issues of The Scrap Book each with the same date. With the October 1908 issue the first section became the only magazine titled The Scrap Book, and the second section was retitled The Cavalier. The last issue of The Scrap Book appeared in January 1912, and the last issue of The Cavalier appeared on May 9, 1914, after which it merged with All-Story Weekly.

Munsey's issued Cavalier Classics for three issues in 1940, which reprinted Zorro stories from their original publication in The Cavalier.
