= The Warlord of Mars =

1914 novel by Edgar Rice Burroughs

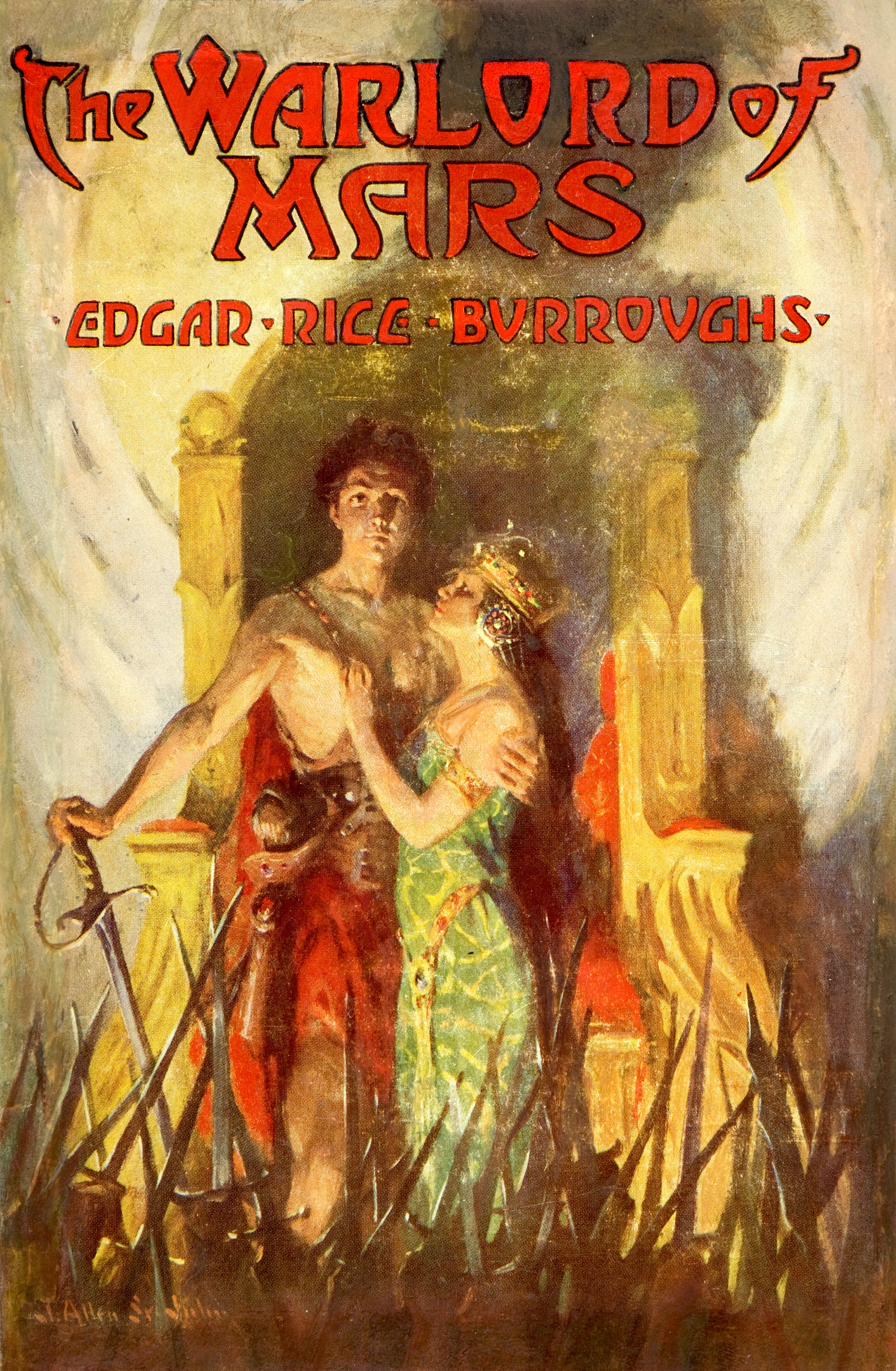
- The Warlord of Mars
- Author: Edgar Rice Burroughs
- Language: English
- Series: Barsoom
- Genre: Science fantasy
- Publisher: A. C. McClurg
- Publication date: 1913-1914
- Publication place: United States
- Media type: Print (hardback & paperback)
- Pages: 296
- Preceded by: The Gods of Mars
- Followed by: Thuvia, Maid of Mars

The Warlord of Mars is a science fantasy novel by American writer Edgar Rice Burroughs, the third of his Barsoom series. Burroughs began writing it in June, 1913, going through five working titles; Yellow Men of Barsoom, The Fighting Prince of Mars, Across Savage Mars, The Prince of Helium, and The War Lord of Mars.

The finished story was first published in All-Story Magazine as a four-part serial in the issues for December, 1913-March, 1914. It was later published as a complete novel by A. C. McClurg in September, 1919.

== Plot introduction ==
This novel continues where the previous one in the series, The Gods of Mars abruptly ended. At the end of the previous book, John Carter's wife, the princess Dejah Thoris, is imprisoned in the Temple of the Sun by the vile pretender goddess Issus. It is said one has to wait an entire Barsoomian year before the room the prisoner is in revolves back to the entrance.

== Plot summary ==
After the battle at the end of the previous book, which ended with the destruction of the religion of Issus, John Carter's wife and two other women were locked in a slowly rotating prison attached to the Temple of the Sun, each of whose hundreds of cells are only open to the outside world once every year. In the meantime, Carter's friend Xodar has become the new Jeddak (chief or king) of the black Martian First Born, and those white Martian therns who reject the old religion likewise gain a new unnamed leader, but there are still some who wish to keep the old discredited religion going, including the therns' erstwhile leader, the Holy Hekkador Matai Shang. John Carter discovers that a First Born named Thurid knows the secret of the Temple of the Sun and he and Matai Shang want to rescue the Holy Thern's daughter Phaidor, who has been imprisoned with Dejah Thoris and another Barsoomian princess, Thuvia of Ptarth, in the Temple jail for several hundred days.

Thurid, to spite Carter, gets Matai Shang to also take Dejah Thoris and Thuvia along with them. Carter follows them in the hope of liberating his beloved wife.

His antagonists flee to the north, taking the three women along. (This resolves the cliffhanger from the previous book, in which Phaidor attempts to stab Dejah Thoris; apparently, Thuvia successfully disarmed Phaidor, and nobody was killed.) In the equatorial Land of Kaol, on the opposite side of the planet from Helium, their jeddak Kulan Tith has not yet abandoned the old religion, and accepted Matai Shang's request for safe haven. Carter rescues the jeddak's forces from an ambush, and is admitted to Kaol, as a neighboring jeddak and good friend of his comes for a visit with his huge retinue. Matai Shang and Thurid unmask Carter's disguise and denounce his heresies, but the visiting jeddak, Thuvan Dihn of Ptarth, who is Thuvia's father, hotly defends Carter. Kulan Tith orders Matai Shang to deliver Dejah Thoris and Thuvia, but instead, he and Thurid take the women and flee to the north. After this treachery against his friend, Kulan Tith finally abjures the old religion and offers whatever help he can to Carter and Thuvan Dihn, but little can be done at this point.

Thereafter John Carter follows them untiringly into the north polar regions where he discovers more fantastic creatures and the nearly forgotten Yellow Martians, who live on the north polar cap behind a ring-shaped ice barrier. After traversing through the Carrion Caves which cross the barrier, Carter and Thuvan Dihn encounter Talu, the rebellious nephew of the tyrant Salensus Oll, who rules the yellow Martians' realm of Okar from the city of Kadabra. Talu provides Carter and Thuvan Dihn with advice and assistance, including disguising the two as yellow Martians. They infiltrate Salensus Oll's court, but Thurid and Matai Shang discover Carter, and have him thrown into a pit. Carter escapes thanks to help from one of Talu's moles in the court. Carter rescues Tardos Mors and Mors Kajak of Helium, triggering a rebellion among the Heliumite prisoners, which turns into a full-fledged invasion after Carter deactivates the yellow Martians' magnetic tower that wrecks invading fleets so Helium's fleet can land safely, carrying a volunteer force of Green Martians headed by Tars Tarkas as well. After a tremendous battle, Salensus Oll is killed, and Thurid and Matai Shang are forced to flee. In a dramatic scene, Carter follows them onto an airship, over a chasm. First, Matai Shang is tossed overboard by Thurid and killed, then after Thurid attempts to do the same to Carter, he is knifed and thrown overboard by Phaidor. Lastly, Phaidor announces to Carter that she repents of her jealousy, and recognizes the love that Carter and Dejah Thoris have for each other, and throws herself overboard in reparation for her sins before Carter can stop her.

Afterwards, in a continuation of Zat Arrras' trial, Carter is instead proclaimed "Warlord of Barsoom" by his allies. This book is the last to feature Tars Tarkas, John Carter's ally, in any major role; indeed, the green Barsoomians of whom Tars Tarkas is an oligarch disappear altogether from most of the later novels.

== Characters ==
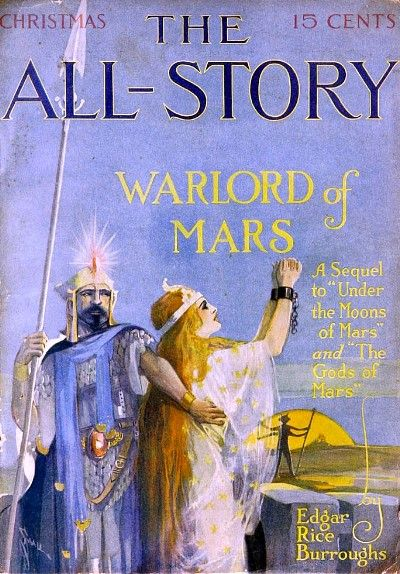
The Warlord of Mars was serialized in All-Story Magazine in 1913-14

- John Carter: Protagonist of the first three novels. Carter is an American Civil War veteran, transported to the planet Mars by a form of astral projection. There, he encounters both formidable alien creatures and various warring Martian races, wins the hand of Martian princess Dejah Thoris, and rises to the position of Warlord of Mars.
- Dejah Thoris: A Martian Princess of Helium, who is courageous, tough and always holds her resolve, despite being frequently placed in both mortal danger and the threat of being dishonored by the lust of villains. She is the daughter of Mors Kajak, jed of Lesser Helium and granddaughter of Tardos Mors, jeddak of Helium; highly aristocratic; and fiercely proud of her heritage. She is the love interest of John Carter. She was imprisoned by the Martian false deity Issus, at the end of The Gods of Mars. A central character in the first three Barsoom novels, whose capture by various enemies, and subsequent pursuit by John Carter, is a constant motivating force in these tales.
- Tars Tarkas: A Green Martian, who becomes the ally of John Carter and at his behest, the overlord of his clan. An archetypal noble savage, and considered John Carter's first and closest friend upon Barsoom.
- Thuvia of Ptarth: A Princess of Ptarth, who appears in The Gods of Mars as a slave girl rescued by John Carter from the Therns. She is later imprisoned with Carter's wife Dejah Thoris, in a prison which can only be opened once per year and remains by her side until the conclusion of The Warlord of Mars. Like many of Burroughs' heroines, she is tough, courageous, proud, and strongly identified with her aristocratic position in Martian society.

== Genre ==
The novel can be classed as a planetary romance, also known as "Sword and planet". This genre is a subset of science fiction, similar to sword and sorcery, but including scientific elements. Most of the action in a planetary romance is on the surface of an alien world, usually includes sword fighting, monsters, supernatural elements as telepathy rather than magic, and involves civilizations echoing those on Earth in pre-technological eras, particularly composed of kingdoms or theocratic nations. Spacecraft may appear, but are usually not central to the story.

== Setting ==
=== Scientific basis ===
Burroughs' vision of Mars was loosely inspired by astronomical speculation of the time, especially that of Percival Lowell, who saw the planet as a formerly Earthlike world now becoming less hospitable to life due to its advanced age, whose inhabitants had built canals to bring water from the polar caps to irrigate the remaining arable land. Lowell was influenced by Italian astronomer, Giovanni Virginio Schiaparelli, who in 1878, had observed features on Mars he called canali (Italian for "channels"). Mistranslation of this into English as "canals" fueled belief the planet was inhabited. The theory of an inhabited planet with flowing water was disproved by data provided by Russian and American probes such as the two Viking missions which found a dead, frozen world where water could not exist in a fluid state.

=== World of Barsoom ===
A million years before the narrative commences, Mars was a lush world with oceans. As the oceans receded, and the atmosphere grew thin, the planet has devolved into a landscape of partial barbarism; living on an aging planet, with dwindling resources, the inhabitants of Barsoom have become hardened and warlike, fighting one another to survive. Barsoomians distribute scarce water supplies via a worldwide system of canals, controlled by quarreling city-states. The thinning Martian atmosphere is artificially replenished from an "atmosphere plant".

==== Race ====
The world of Barsoom is divided by the territory of Black, Green, Red, Yellow and White skinned races. Each has particular traits and qualities, which seem to define most individuals within them. This concept of race is more like a division between species than ethnicity. The Warlord of Mars introduces the Yellow Martians, supposedly extinct, whom John Carter finds in secret domed cities at the north pole. They are black-bearded, exceptionally cruel, and keep slaves, acquiring these by using a giant magnetic device which sends fliers off course, and allows the Yellow Martians to capture the occupants.

== Copyright ==
The copyright for this story has expired in the United States and, thus, now resides in the public domain there. The text is available via Project Gutenberg.

== Sources ==
- Bainbridge, Williams Sims (1986). Dimensions of Science Fiction. Cambridge, Massachusetts: Harvard University Press. ISBN 0-674-20725-4.
- Baxter, Stephen (2005). Yeffeth, Glenn (ed.). H.G. Wells' Enduring Mythos of Mars. BenBalla Books. ISBN 1-932100-55-5.
- Bleiler, Everett (1948). The Checklist of Fantastic Literature. Chicago: Shasta Publishers. p. 68.
- Bleiler, Everett F.; Bleiler, Richard (1990). Science Fiction, the Early Years. Kent State University Press. ISBN 0-87338-416-4.
- Harris-Fain, Darren (2005). Understanding Contemporary American Science Fiction. Univ of South Carolina Press. ISBN 1-57003-585-7.
- Holtsmark, Erling B. (1986). Edgar Rice Burroughs. Boston: Twain Publishers. ISBN 0-8057-7459-9.
- Porges, Irwin (1975). Edgar Rice Burroughs. Provo, Utah: Brigham Young University Press. ISBN 0-8425-0079-0.
- Sampson, Robert (1984). Yesterday's Faces: A Study of Series Characters in the Early Pulp Magazines. Popular Press. ISBN 0-87972-262-2.
- Seed, David (2005). A Companion to Science Fiction. Blackwell Publishing. ISBN 1-4051-1218-2.
- Sharp, Patrick B. (2007). Savage Perils. University of Oklahoma Press. ISBN 978-0-8061-3822-0.
- Slotkin, Richard (1998). Gunfighter Nation. University of Oklahoma Press. ISBN 0-8061-3031-8.
- Westfahl, Gary (2000). Space and Beyond. Greenwood Publishing Groups. ISBN 0-313-30846-2.
