= Edgar Rice Burroughs bibliography =

The following is the complete bibliography of Edgar Rice Burroughs. The titles are listed chronologically as written.

== List of works ==
Note: Numbers in parentheses following years indicate months.

Title	Series	Date written	First publication	Cover	Book published
Minidoka: 937th Earl of One Mile Series M		1903	1998 (Dark Horse Comics)		1998 (Dark Horse Comics)
A Princess of Mars	Barsoom #01	1911	1912 (02–07) (All-Story Magazine)		1917 (10) (A. C. McClurg)
The Outlaw of Torn	Historical #2	1911	1914 (01–05) (New Story Magazine)		1927 (02) (A. C. McClurg)
Tarzan of the Apes	Tarzan #01	1911	1912 (10) (All-Story Magazine)		1914 (A. C. McClurg)
The Gods of Mars	Barsoom #02	1912	1913 (01–05) (All-Story Magazine)		1918 (09) (A. C. McClurg)
The Return of Tarzan	Tarzan #02	1912	1913 (06–12) (New Story Magazine)		1915 (A. C. McClurg)
At the Earth's Core	Pellucidar #01	1913	1914 (04) (All-Story Weekly)		1922 (07) (A. C. McClurg)
The Cave Girl	Jungle #2	1913	1913 (07–09) (All-Story Magazine)		1925 (03) (A. C. McClurg)
The Monster Men	Science fiction #1	1913	1913 (11) (All-Story Magazine)		1929 (03) (A. C. McClurg)
The Warlord of Mars	Barsoom #03	1913	1913 (12), 1914 (01–03) (All-Story Magazine)		1919 (09) (A. C. McClurg)
The Mucker	Mucker #1	1913	1914 (10–11) (All-Story Weekly)		1921 (10) (A. C. McClurg)
The Mad King	The Custer Siblings #2	1913	1914 (03) (All-Story Weekly)		1926 (09) (A. C. McClurg)
The Eternal Lover (The Eternal Savage)	The Custer Siblings #1; Tarzan #04.5	1913	1914 (03) (All-Story Weekly)		1925 (10) (A. C. McClurg)
The Beasts of Tarzan	Tarzan #03	1914	1914 (05–06) (All-Story Weekly)		1916 (A. C. McClurg)
The Lad and the Lion	Jungle #5	1914	1917 (06–07) (All-Story Weekly)		1938 (02) (ERB Inc.)
The Girl from Farris's	Girl #1	1914	1916 (09–10) (All-Story Weekly)		1959 (Wilma Co.)
Thuvia, Maid of Mars	Barsoom #04	1914	1916 (04) (All-Story Weekly)		1920 (10) (A. C. McClurg)
The Cave Man	Jungle #3	1914	1917 (03–04) (All-Story Weekly)		1925 (03) (A. C. McClurg)
Sweetheart Primeval	Tarzan The Custer Siblings	1914	1915 (01–02) (All-Story Weekly)		1925 (10) (A. C. McClurg)
Barney Custer of Beatrice	Tarzan The Custer Siblings	1914	1915 (08) (All-Story Weekly)		1926 (09) (A. C. McClurg)
Pellucidar	Pellucidar #02	1914	1915 (05) (All-Story Weekly)		1923 (09) (A. C. McClurg)
The Son of Tarzan	Tarzan #04	1915	1915 (12), 1916 (01) (All-Story Weekly)		1917 (03) (A. C. McClurg)
The Man-Eater	Jungle #1	1915	1915 (11) (New York Evening World)		1955 (Fantasy Press)
Beyond Thirty aka The Lost Continent	Beyond #1	1915	1916 (02) (All Around Magazine)		1955 (Fantasy Press)
Tarzan and the Jewels of Opar	Tarzan #05	1915	1916 (11–12) (All-Story Weekly)		1918 (04) (A. C. McClurg)
The Rider		1915	1918 (12) (All-Story Weekly)		1937 (02) (ERB, Inc.)
The Return of the Mucker	Mucker #2	1916	1916 (06–07) (All-Story Weekly)		1921 (10) (A. C. McClurg)
Jungle Tales of Tarzan	Tarzan #06	1916	1916 (09–12), 1917 (01–08) (Blue Book Magazine)		1919 (03) (A. C. McClurg)
The Oakdale Affair	Mucker #3	1917	1918 (03) (Blue Book Magazine)		1937 (02) (ERB, Inc.)
The Land That Time Forgot	Caspak #01	1917	1918 (08) (Blue Book Magazine)		1924 (06) (A. C. McClurg)
The People That Time Forgot	Caspak #02	1918	1918 (10) (Blue Book Magazine)		1924 (06) (A. C. McClurg)
Out of Time's Abyss	Caspak #03	1918	1918 (12) (Blue Book Magazine)		1924 (06) (A. C. McClurg)
Tarzan the Untamed	Tarzan #07	1918	1919 (03–08) (Red Book Magazine)		1920 (04) (A. C. McClurg)
Tarzan and the Valley of Luna	Tarzan #07	1919	1920 (03–04) (All-Story Weekly)		1920 (04) (A. C. McClurg)
The Moon Men	Moon #02	1919	1925 (02–03) (All-Story Weekly)		1926 (02) (A. C. McClurg)
The Efficiency Expert		1919	1921 (10) (All-Story Weekly)		1966 (House of Greystoke)
Tarzan the Terrible	Tarzan #08	1920	1921 (02–03) (All-Story Weekly)		1921 (06) (A. C. McClurg)
The Chessmen of Mars	Barsoom #05	1921	1922 (02–03) (All-Story Weekly)		1922 (11) (A. C. McClurg)
The Girl from Hollywood	Girl #2	1921	1922 (06–11) (Munsey's Magazine)		1923 (08) (Macaulay Co.)
Tarzan and the Golden Lion	Tarzan #09	1922	1922 (12), 1923 (01) (All-Story Weekly)		1923 (03) (A. C. McClurg)
The Moon Maid	Moon #01	1922	1923 (05–06) (All-Story Weekly)		1926 (02) (A. C. McClurg)
The Scientists Revolt		1922	1939 (07) (Fantastic Adventures)		1974 (Burroughs Bulletin)
The Bandit of Hell's Bend	Western #1	1923	1924 (09–10) (All-Story Weekly)		1925 (06) (A. C. McClurg)
Tarzan and the Ant Men	Tarzan #10	1923	1924 (02–03) (All-Story Weekly)		1924 (09) (A. C. McClurg)
Marcia of the Doorstep		1924	1999 (Donald M. Grant)		1999 (Donald M. Grant)
The Red Hawk	Moon #03	1925	1925 (09) (All-Story Weekly)		1926 (02) (A. C. McClurg)
The Master Mind of Mars	Barsoom #06	1925	1927 (07) (Amazing Stories Annual)		1928 (03) (A. C. McClurg)
The War Chief	Western #2	1926	1927 (04–05) (All-Story Weekly)		1927 (09) (A. C. McClurg)
The Tarzan Twins	Tarzan 25	1926	1927 (10) (P. F. Volland)		1963 (Canaveral Press)
You Lucky Girl!	Girl #3	1927	1999 (Donald M. Grant)		1999 (Donald M. Grant)
Tarzan, Lord of the Jungle	Tarzan #11	1927	1927 (12), 1928 (01–05) (Blue Book Magazine)		1928 (09) (A. C. McClurg)
Apache Devil	Western #3	1927	1928 (05–06) (All-Story Weekly)		1933 (02) (ERB, Inc.)
Tarzan and the Tarzan Twins with Jad-Bal-Ja, the Golden Lion	Tarzan 26	1928	1936 (03) (Whitman Publishing)		1963 (Canaveral Press)
Tarzan and the Lost Empire	Tarzan #12	1928	1928 (10–12), 1929 (01–02) (Blue Book Magazine)		1929 (09) (Metropolitan Books)
Tanar of Pellucidar	Pellucidar #03	1928	1929 (03–08) (Blue Book Magazine)		1930 (05) (Metropolitan Books)
Tarzan at the Earth's Core	Tarzan #13; Pellucidar #04	1929	1929 (09–12), 1930 (01–03) (Blue Book Magazine)		1930 (11) (Metropolitan Books)
A Fighting Man of Mars	Barsoom #07	1929	1930 (04–09) (Blue Book Magazine)		1931 (05) (Metropolitan Books)
Jungle Girl aka. The Land of Hidden Men	Jungle #4	1929	1931 (05–09) (Blue Book Magazine)		1932 (04) (ERB, Inc.)
Tarzan the Invincible	Tarzan #14	1930	1930 (10–12), 1931 (01–04) (Blue Book Magazine)		1931 (11) (ERB, Inc.)
The Deputy Sheriff of Comanche County	Western #4	1930	1940 (04–05) (Thrilling Adventures)		1940 (09) (ERB, Inc.)
Tarzan Triumphant	Tarzan #15	1931	1931 (10–12), 1932 (01–03) (Blue Book Magazine)		1932 (09) (ERB, Inc.)
Tarzan and the Leopard Men	Tarzan #18	1931	1932 (08–12), 1933 (01) (Blue Book Magazine)		1935 (09) (ERB, Inc.)
Pirates of Venus	Venus #01	1931	1932 (09–10) (Argosy Weekly)		1934 (02) (ERB, Inc.)
Tarzan and the City of Gold	Tarzan #16	1931	1932 (03–04) (Argosy Weekly)		1933 (09) (ERB, Inc.)
Pirate Blood		1932	1970 (Ace Books)		1970 (Ace Books)
Lost on Venus	Venus #02	1932	1933 (03–04) (Argosy Weekly)		1935 (02) (ERB, Inc.)
Tarzan and the Lion Man	Tarzan #17	1933	1933 (11–12), 1934 (01) (Liberty)		1934 (09) (ERB, Inc.)
Swords of Mars	Barsoom #08	1933	1934 (11–12), 1935 (01–04) (Blue Book Magazine)		1936 (02) (ERB, Inc.)
Tarzan's Quest	Tarzan #19	1934	1935 (10–12), 1936 (01–03) (Blue Book Magazine)		1936 (09) (ERB, Inc.)
Back to the Stone Age	Pellucidar #05	1935	1937 (01–02) (Argosy Weekly)		1937 (09) (ERB, Inc.)
Tarzan and the Magic Men	Tarzan #21	1935	1936 (09–10) (Argosy Weekly)		1939 (09) (ERB, Inc.)
The Resurrection of Jimber-Jaw	Science fiction #2	1936	1937 (02) (Argosy Weekly)		1964 (04) (Canaveral Press)
Tarzan and the Elephant Men	Tarzan #21	1937	1937 (11–12), 1938 (01) (Blue Book Magazine)		1939 (09) (ERB, Inc.)
Carson of Venus	Venus #03	1937	1938 (01–02) (Argosy Weekly)		1939 (02) (ERB, Inc.)
Tarzan and the Forbidden City	Tarzan #20	1937	1938 (03–04) (Argosy Weekly)		1938 (09) (ERB, Inc.)
Synthetic Men of Mars	Barsoom #09	1938	1939 (01–02) (Argosy Weekly)		1940 (03) (ERB, Inc.)
Land of Terror	Pellucidar #06	1939	1944 (ERB, Inc.)		1944 (ERB, Inc.)
Tarzan and the Jungle Murders	Tarzan #24	1939	1940 (06) (Thrilling Adventures)		1965 (Canaveral Press)
Tarzan and the Champion	Tarzan #24	1939	1940 (04) (Blue Book Magazine)		1965 (Canaveral Press)
Tarzan and the Madman	Tarzan #23	1940	1964 (06) (Canaveral Press)		1964 (06) (Canaveral Press)
Slaves of the Fish Men	Venus #04	1940	1941 (03) (Fantastic Adventures)		1946 (ERB, Inc.)
The City of Mummies	Barsoom #10	1940	1941 (03) (Amazing Stories)		1948 (ERB, Inc.)
The Return to Pellucidar	Pellucidar #07	1940	1942 (02) (Amazing Stories)		1963 (Canaveral Press)
Goddess of Fire	Venus #04	1940	1941 (07) (Fantastic Adventures)		1946 (ERB, Inc.)
Black Pirates of Barsoom	Barsoom #10	1940	1941 (06) (Amazing Stories)		1948 (ERB, Inc.)
Men of the Bronze Age	Pellucidar #07	1940	1942 (03) (Amazing Stories)		1963 (Canaveral Press)
The Living Dead	Venus #04	1940	1941 (11) (Fantastic Adventures)		1946 (ERB, Inc.)
Yellow Men of Mars	Barsoom #10	1940	1941 (08) (Amazing Stories)		1948 (ERB, Inc.)
Adventure on Poloda	Beyond #2	1940	1942 (01) (Blue Book Magazine)		1964 (04) (Canaveral Press)
Tiger Girl	Pellucidar #07	1940	1942 (04) (Amazing Stories)		1963 (Canaveral Press)
War on Venus	Venus #04	1940	1942 (03) (Fantastic Adventures)		1946 (ERB, Inc.)
Invisible Men of Mars	Barsoom #10	1940	1941 (10) (Amazing Stories)		1948 (ERB, Inc.)
The Quest of Tarzan	Tarzan #24	1940	1941 (08–09) (Argosy Weekly)		1965 (Canaveral Press)
Tangor Returns	Beyond #3	1940	1964 (04) (Canaveral Press)		1964 (04) (Canaveral Press)
I Am a Barbarian	Historical #1	1941	1967 (ERB, Inc.)		1967 (ERB, Inc.)
The Wizard of Venus	Venus #05	1941	1964 (04) (Canaveral Press)		1964 (04) (Canaveral Press)
Skeleton Men of Jupiter	Barsoom #11	1941	1943 (02) (Amazing Stories)		1964 (07) (Canaveral Press)
Tarzan and the Foreign Legion	Tarzan #22	1944	1947 (ERB, Inc.)		1947 (ERB, Inc.)
Savage Pellucidar	Pellucidar #07	1944	1963 (11) (Amazing Stories)		1963 (Canaveral Press)
Tarzan: The Lost Adventure	Tarzan 27	1946	1995 (01–04) (Dark Horse Comics)		1995 (Dark Horse Comics)
Forgotten Tales of Love and Murder		1910-1944	2001 (Guidry & Adkins)		2001 (Guidry & Adkins)
