= Venus in fiction =

Depictions of the planet

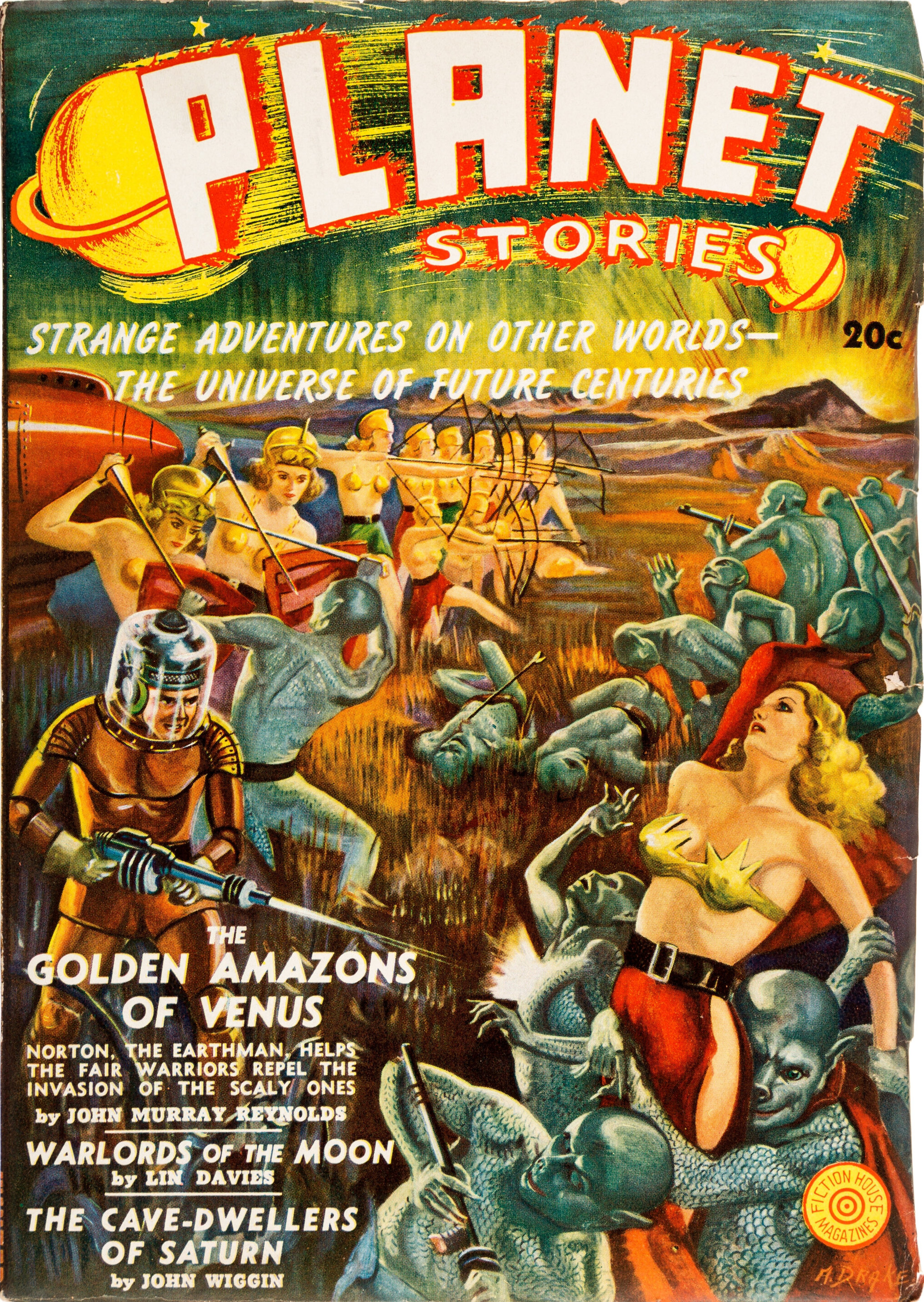
Venus appears in many pulp science fiction stories. Seen here is the winter 1939 cover of Planet Stories, featuring "The Golden Amazons of Venus".

The planet Venus has been used as a setting in fiction since before the 19th century. Its opaque cloud cover gave science fiction writers free rein to speculate on conditions at its surface—a "cosmic Rorschach test", in the words of science fiction author Stephen L. Gillett. The planet was often depicted as warmer than Earth but still habitable by humans. Depictions of Venus as a lush, verdant paradise, an oceanic planet, or fetid swampland, often inhabited by dinosaur-like beasts or other monsters, became common in early pulp science fiction, particularly between the 1930s and 1950s. Some other stories portrayed it as a desert, or invented more exotic settings. The absence of a common vision resulted in Venus not developing a coherent fictional mythology, in contrast to the image of Mars in fiction.

When included, the native sentient inhabitants, Venusians, were often portrayed as gentle, ethereal and beautiful. The planet's associations with the Roman goddess Venus and femininity in general is reflected in many works' portrayals of Venusians. Depictions of Venusian societies have varied both in level of development and type of governance. In addition to humans visiting Venus, several stories feature Venusians coming to Earth—most often to enlighten humanity, but occasionally for warlike purposes.

From the mid-20th century on, as the reality of Venus's harsh surface conditions became known, the early tropes of adventures in Venusian tropics mostly gave way to more realistic stories. The planet became portrayed instead as a hostile, toxic inferno, with stories changing focus to topics of the planet's colonization and terraforming, although the vision of tropical Venus is occasionally revisited in intentionally retro stories.

== Early depictions ==
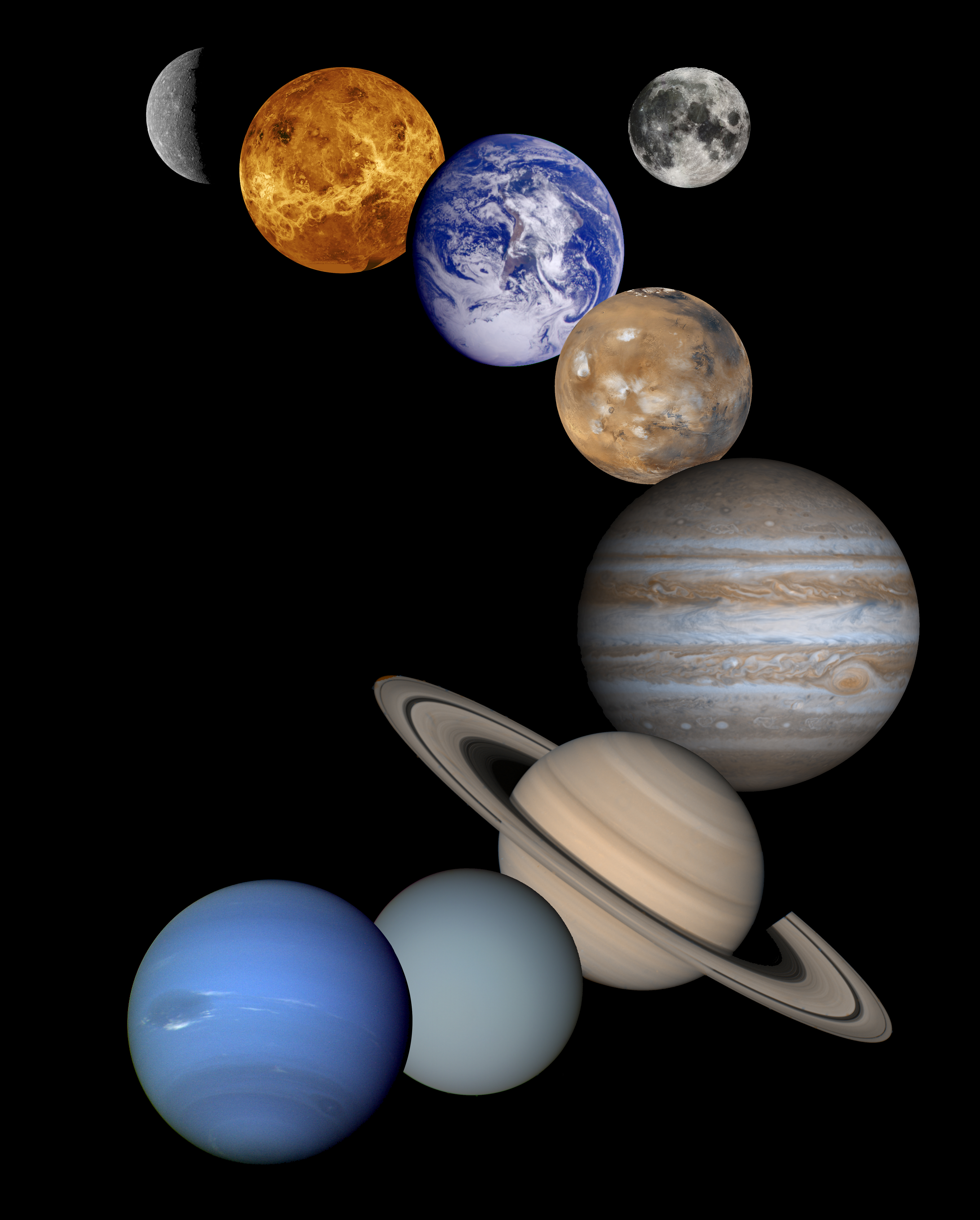
Some early depictions of Venus in fiction were part of tours of the Solar System. Clicking on a planet leads to the article about its depiction in fiction.

The earliest use of the planet Venus as the primary setting in a work of fiction was Voyage à Venus (Voyage to Venus, 1865) by Achille Eyraud, though it had appeared centuries earlier in works depicting multiple locations in the Solar System such as Athanasius Kircher's Itinerarium Exstaticum (1656) and Emanuel Swedenborg's The Earths in Our Solar System (1758). Science fiction scholar Gary Westfahl considers the mention of the "Morning Star" in the second-century work True History by Lucian of Samosata to be the first appearance of Venus—or any other planet—in the genre.

Venus has a thick layer of clouds that prevents telescopic observation of the surface, which gave writers free rein to imagine any kind of world below until Venus exploration probes revealed the true conditions in the 1960s—Stephen L. Gillett describes the situation as a "cosmic Rorschach test". Venus thus became a popular setting in early science fiction, but that same versatility meant that it did not develop a counterpart to the image of Mars in fiction made popular by Percival Lowell around the turn of the century—with supposed Martian canals and a civilization that built them—and it never reached the same level of popularity. On the subject, Westfahl writes that while Mars has a distinctive body of major works such as H. G. Wells's The War of the Worlds (1897) and Ray Bradbury's fix-up novel The Martian Chronicles (1950), Venus largely lacks a corresponding canon.

A clement twilight zone on a synchronously rotating Mercury, a swamp-and-jungle Venus, and a canal-infested Mars, while all classic science-fiction devices, are all, in fact, based upon earlier misapprehensions by planetary scientists.

— Carl Sagan, 1978

One of the many visions was of a tidally locked Venus with half of the planet always exposed to the Sun and the other half in perpetual darkness—as was widely believed to be the case with Mercury at the time. This concept was introduced by Italian astronomer Giovanni Schiaparelli in 1880 and appeared in Garrett P. Serviss's A Columbus of Space (1909) and Garret Smith's Between Worlds (1919), among others. A common assumption was that the Venusian clouds were made of water, as clouds on Earth are, and consequently the planet was most often portrayed as having a wet climate. This sometimes meant vast oceans, but more commonly swamps and/or jungles. Another influential idea was the early version of the nebular hypothesis of Solar System formation which held that the planets are older the further from the Sun they are, meaning that Venus should be younger than Earth and might resemble earlier periods in Earth's history such as the Carboniferous. Scientist Svante Arrhenius popularized the idea of Venus being swamp-covered with flora and fauna similar to that of prehistoric Earth in his non-fiction book The Destinies of the Stars (1918). Whereas Arrhenius assumed that Venus had unchanging climatic conditions that were similar all over the planet and concluded that a lack of adaptation to environmental variability would result only in primitive lifeforms, later writers often included various megafauna.

=== Jungle and swamp ===
Early treatments of a Venus covered in swamps and jungles are found in Gustavus W. Pope's Journey to Venus (1895), Fred T. Jane's To Venus in Five Seconds (1897), and Maurice Baring's "Venus" (1909). Following its popularization by Arrhenius, the portrayal of the Venusian landscape as dominated by jungles and swamps recurred frequently in other works of fiction; in particular, Brian Stableford says in Science Fact and Science Fiction: An Encyclopedia that it became "a staple of pulp science fiction imagery". Clark Ashton Smith's "The Immeasurable Horror" (1931) and Lester del Rey's "The Luck of Ignatz" (1939) depict threatening Venusian creatures in a swamp-and-jungle climate. "In the Walls of Eryx" (1936) by H. P. Lovecraft and Kenneth Sterling features an invisible maze on a jungle Venus.

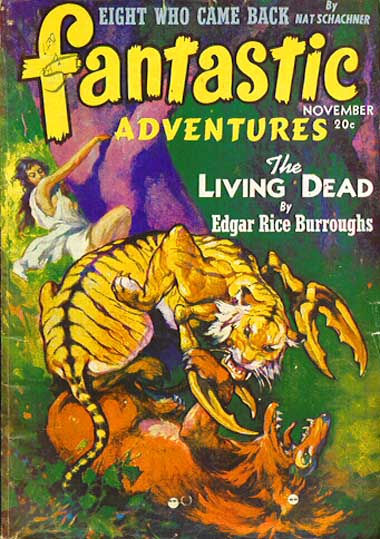
Cover of Fantastic Adventures, November 1941, featuring the Amtor story "The Living Dead" from Burroughs's Escape on Venus

In the planetary romance subgenre that flourished in this era, Ralph Milne Farley and Otis Adelbert Kline wrote series in this setting starting with The Radio Man (1924) and The Planet of Peril (1929), respectively. These stories were inspired by Edgar Rice Burroughs's Martian Barsoom series that began with A Princess of Mars (1912); Burroughs later wrote planetary romances set on a swampy Venus in the Amtor series, beginning with Pirates of Venus (1932). Other authors who wrote planetary romances in this setting include C. L. Moore with the Northwest Smith adventure "Black Thirst" (1934) and Leigh Brackett with stories like "The Moon that Vanished" (1948) and the Eric John Stark story "Enchantress of Venus" (1949).

Robert A. Heinlein portrayed Venusian swamps in several unrelated stories including "Logic of Empire" (1941), Space Cadet (1948), and Podkayne of Mars (1963). On television, a 1955 episode of Tom Corbett, Space Cadet depicts a crash landing in a Venusian swamp. Bradbury's short story "The Long Rain" (1950) depicts Venus as a planet with incessant rain, and was later adapted to screen twice: to film in The Illustrated Man (1969) and to television in The Ray Bradbury Theater (1992)—though the latter removed all references to Venus in light of the changed scientific views on the planet's conditions. Bradbury revisited the rainy vision of Venus in "All Summer in a Day" (1954), where the Sun is only visible through the cloud cover once every seven years. In German science fiction, the Perry Rhodan novels (launched in 1961) used the vision of Venus as a jungle world, while the protagonist in K. H. Scheer's sixteenth ZBV novel Raumpatrouille Nebelwelt (1963) is surprised to find that Venus does not have jungles—reflecting then-recent discoveries about the environmental conditions on Venus.

=== Ocean ===
Others envisioned Venus as a panthalassic planet, covered by a planet-wide ocean with perhaps a few islands. Large land masses were thought impossible due to the assumption that they would have generated atmospheric updrafts disrupting the planet's solid cloud layer. Early treatments of an oceanic Venus include Harl Vincent's "Venus Liberated" (1929) and Leslie F. Stone's "Women with Wings" (1930) and Across the Void (1931). In Olaf Stapledon's Last and First Men (1930), future descendants of humanity are modified to be adapted to life on an ocean-covered Venus. Clifford D. Simak's "Rim of the Deep" (1940) likewise features an oceanic Venus, with the story set at the bottom of Venusian seas, featuring pirates and hostile Venusian aliens. C. S. Lewis's Perelandra (1943) retells the Biblical story of Adam and Eve in the Garden of Eden on floating islands in a vast Venusian ocean. Isaac Asimov's Lucky Starr and the Oceans of Venus (1954) depicts human colonists living in underwater cities on Venus. In Poul Anderson's "Sister Planet" (1959), migration to an oceanic Venus is contemplated as a potential solution to Earth's overpopulation. "Clash by Night" (1943) by Lawrence O'Donnell (joint pseudonym of C. L. Moore and Henry Kuttner) and its sequel Fury (1947) describe survivors from a devastated Earth living beneath Venusian oceans. Those two works have been called in The Encyclopedia of Science Fiction "the most enduring pulp image" of an oceanic Venus, and the former received another sequel decades later, The Jungle (1991) by David A. Drake. Roger Zelazny's "The Doors of His Face, the Lamps of His Mouth" (1965) was the last major depiction of an ocean-covered Venus, published shortly after that vision had been rendered obsolete by advances in planetary science.

=== Desert ===
A third group of early theories about conditions on Venus explained the cloud cover with a hot, dry planet where the atmosphere holds water vapor and the surface has dust storms. The idea that water is abundant on Venus was controversial, and by 1940 Rupert Wildt had already discussed how a greenhouse effect might result in a hot Venus. The vision of a desert Venus was never as popular as that of a swampy or jungle one, but by the 1950s it started appearing in a number of works. Frederik Pohl and Cyril M. Kornbluth's The Space Merchants (1952) is a satire that depicts Venus being successfully marketed as an appealing destination for migrants from Earth in spite of its hostile environment. In Robert Sheckley's "Prospector's Special" (1959), the desert surface of Venus is mined for resources. Arthur C. Clarke's "Before Eden" (1961) portrays Venus as mostly hot and dry, but with a somewhat cooler climate habitable to extremophiles at the poles. Dean McLaughlin's The Fury from Earth (1963) likewise features a dry, hostile Venus, this time rebelling against Earth. While these inhospitable portrayals more accurately reflected the emerging scientific data, they nevertheless generally underestimated the harshness of the planet's conditions.

== Paradigm shift ==
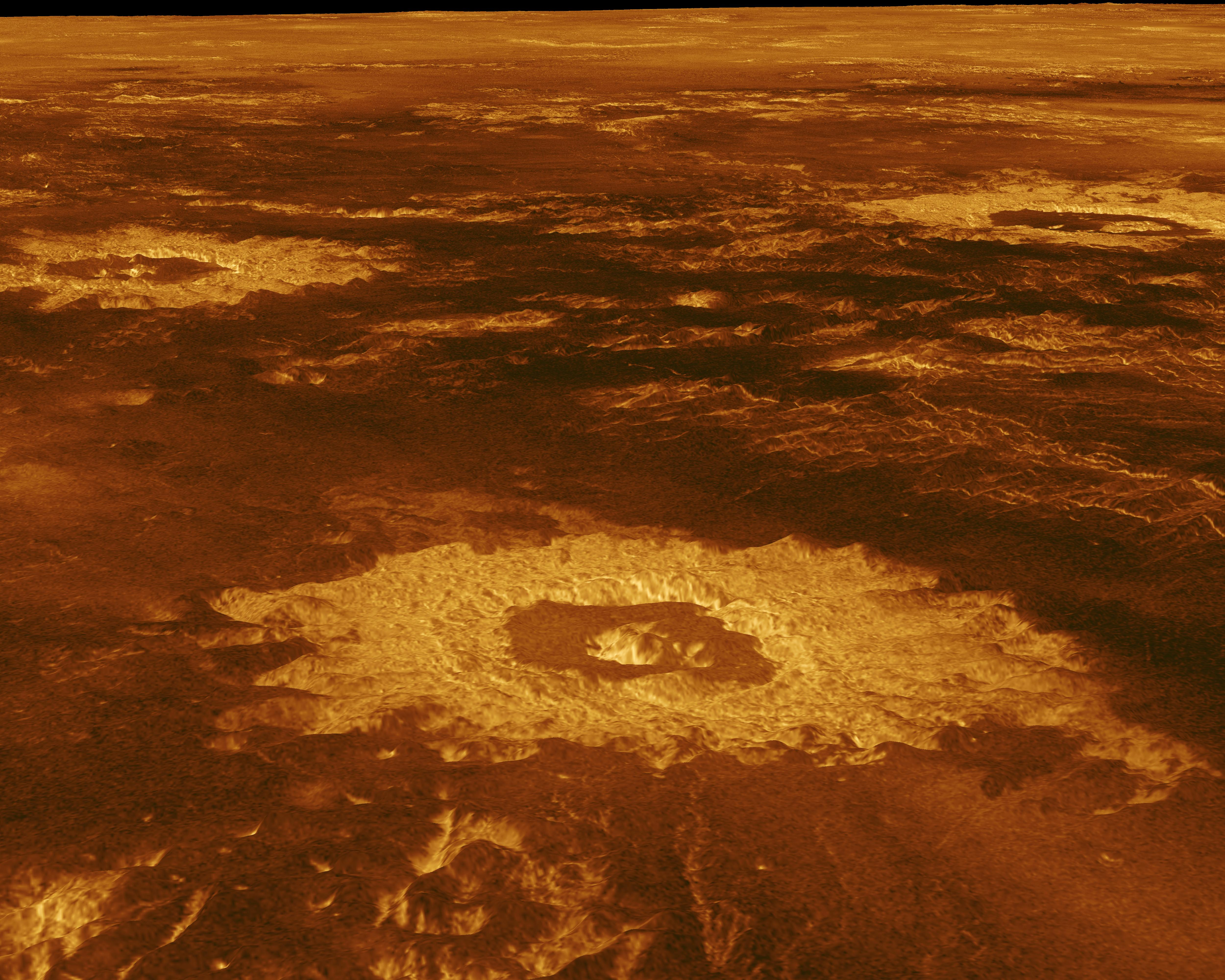
The barren, cratered surface of Venus. (Magellan radar imagery)

In scientific circles, life on Venus was increasingly viewed as unlikely from the 1930s on, as more advanced methods for observing Venus suggested that its atmosphere lacked oxygen. In the Space Age, space probes starting with the 1962 Mariner 2 found that Venus's surface temperature was in the range of 800–900 °F (400–500 °C), and atmospheric pressure at ground-level was many times that of Earth's. This rendered obsolete fiction that had depicted a planet with exotic but habitable settings, and writers' interest in the planet diminished when its inhospitability became better understood.Some works go so far as to portray Venus as a mostly ignored part of an otherwise thoroughly explored Solar System; examples include Clarke's Rendezvous with Rama (1973) and the novel series The Expanse (2011–2021) by James S. A. Corey (joint pseudonym of Daniel Abraham and Ty Franck).

=== Nostalgic depictions ===
A romantic, habitable, pre-Mariner Venus continued to appear for a while in deliberately nostalgic and retro works such as Zelazny's "The Doors of His Face, the Lamps of His Mouth" (1965) and Thomas M. Disch's "Come to Venus Melancholy" (1965), and Brian Aldiss and Harry Harrison collected works written before the scientific advancements in the anthology Farewell, Fantastic Venus (1968). The nostalgic image of Venus has also occasionally resurfaced several decades later: S. M. Stirling's The Sky People (2006) takes place in an alternate universe where the pulp version of Venus is real, and the anthology Old Venus (2015) edited by George R. R. Martin and Gardner Dozois collects newly written works in the style of older stories about the now-outdated vision of Venus. The role-playing games Space: 1889 (1989) and Mutant Chronicles (1993) likewise use a deliberately retro depiction of Venus.

== Human survival ==
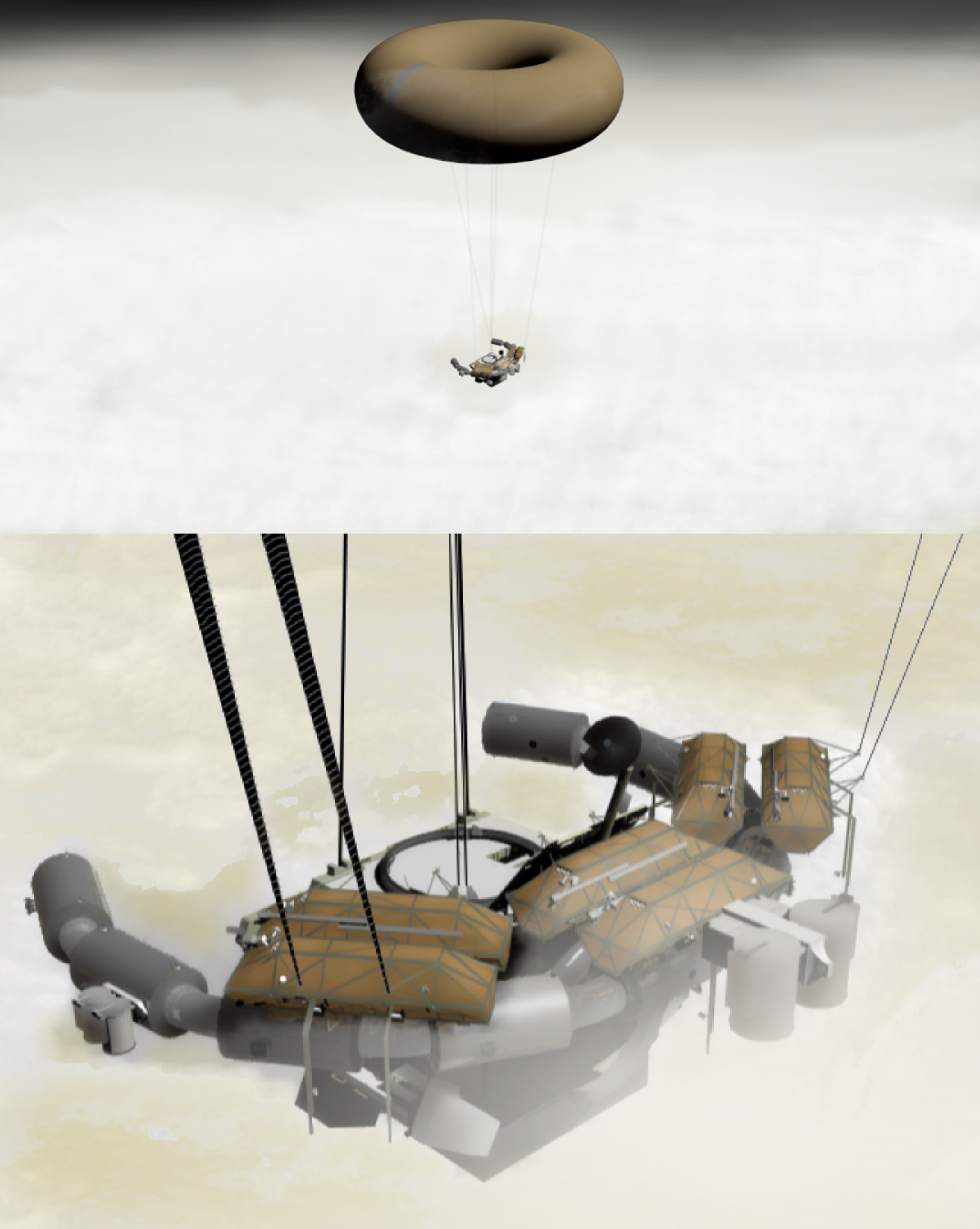
Artist's impression of a hypothetical floating outpost high up in the Venusian atmosphere. Floating settlements of this kind appear in works like "The Sultan of the Clouds" by Geoffrey A. Landis.

Even before the hellish conditions on Venus were known, some authors imagined it as a place that would be hostile to humans. Stories about survival in less extreme conditions had appeared in works such as John W. Campbell's "Solarite" (1930), where the surface temperature exceeds 150 °F (70 °C); Clifton B. Kruse's "Menace from Saturn" (1935), where the atmosphere is toxic; and Philip Latham's Five Against Venus (1952), a Robinsonade. Similarly, colonization stories had been popular throughout the 1940s and 1950s, and became so again towards the end of the century in parallel to the rise in popularity of fictional terraforming projects. Following the Space Age discoveries about the conditions on Venus, fiction about the planet started to mainly focus on survival in the hostile environment, as in Larry Niven's "Becalmed in Hell" (1965). Devices for protection against the elements in these stories include domed cities as in John Varley's "In the Bowl" (1975), environmental suits as in Brian and Frank Herbert's Man of Two Worlds (1986), floating cities as in Geoffrey A. Landis's "The Sultan of the Clouds" (2010) and Derek Künsken's The House of Styx (2020), and space stations.

=== Colonization ===
Colonization of Venus appeared as early as J. B. S. Haldane's essay "The Last Judgment" (1927) and John Wyndham's "The Venus Adventure" (1932), and grew in popularity in subsequent decades. Following emerging scientific evidence of Venus's harsh conditions, colonization of Venus was increasingly portrayed as more challenging than colonization of Mars. Several writers have suggested that colonists on the surface of Venus might have to lead a nomadic life to stay in a favourable position relative to the Sun.

Colonizing Venus is a major theme in Jack Williamson's Seetee series (1949–1951), Rolf Garner's trilogy beginning with Resurgent Dust (1953), and Soviet science fiction writers Arkady and Boris Strugatsky's The Land of Crimson Clouds (1959). In Simak's "Hunger Death" (1938) colonists on Venus contend with a plague deliberately introduced by Martians, Heinlein's "Logic of Empire" has the colonies rely upon exploiting workers trapped in indentured servitude, and S. Makepeace Lott's Escape to Venus (1956) depicts a colony that has turned into a dystopia. Marta Randall's "Big Dome" (1985) features a rediscovered domed colony abandoned during a prior terraforming project; Gillett describes the story's jungle-like setting as an homage to the image of Venus found in early science fiction. Sarah Zettel's The Quiet Invasion (2000) features colonization of Venus by extraterrestrials better adapted to the planet's conditions.

=== Terraforming ===
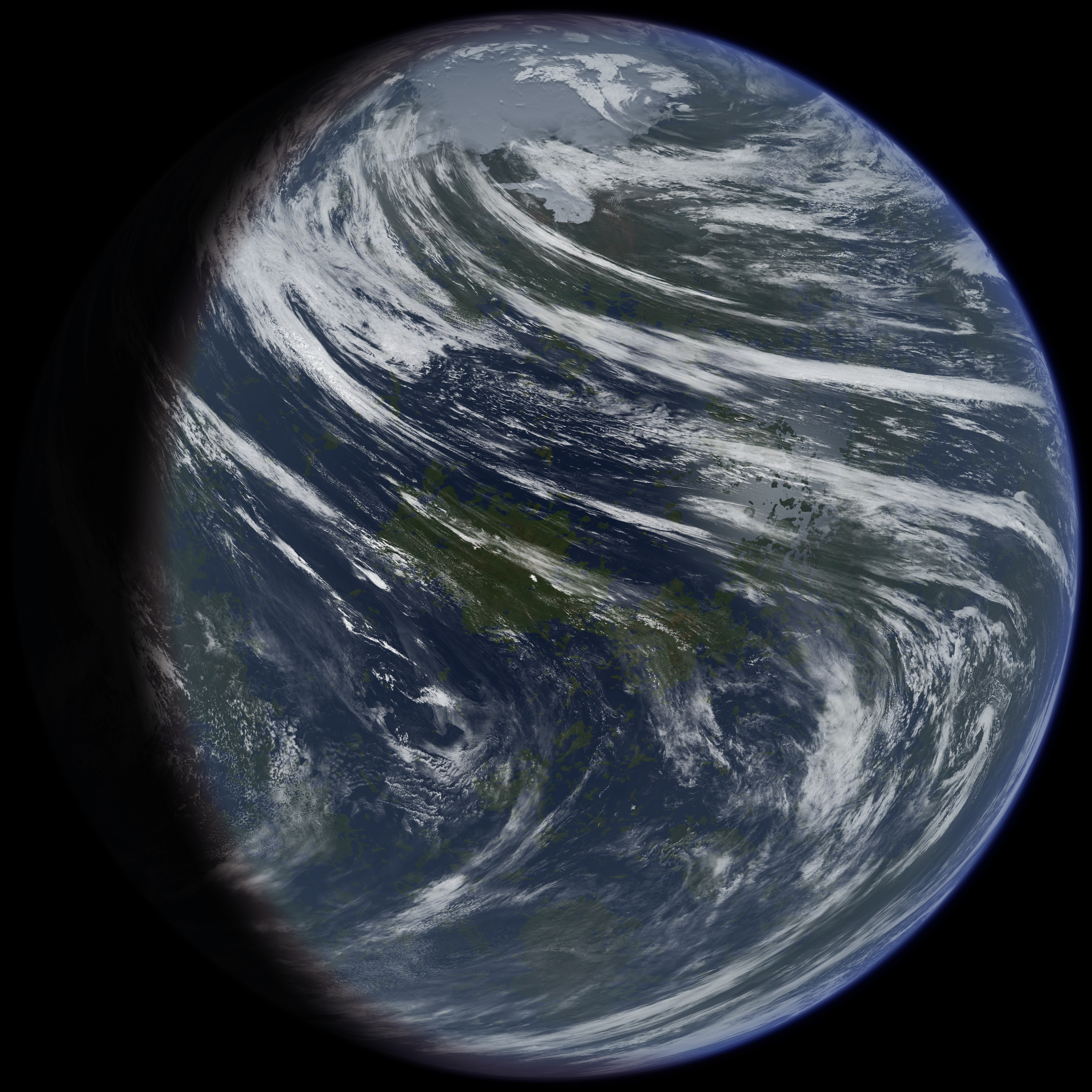
Artist's impression of a terraformed Venus

As scientific knowledge of Venus advanced, science fiction authors endeavored to keep pace, particularly by focusing on the concept of terraforming Venus. An early treatment of the concept is found in Stapledon's Last and First Men, where the process destroys the lifeforms that already existed on the planet. While Venus has since come to be regarded as the most promising candidate for terraforming, before the 1960s science fiction writers were more optimistic about the prospects of terraforming Mars, and early depictions, such as Kuttner and Moore's Fury, consequently portrayed terraforming Venus as more challenging. Anderson's "The Big Rain" (1954) revolves around an attempt to bring about rain on a dry Venus, and in his "To Build A World" (1964), a terraformed Venus becomes the site of countless wars for the more desirable parts of the surface. Other early depictions of terraforming Venus include A. E. van Vogt's The World of Null-A (1948) and James E. Gunn's The Naked Sky (1955).

The terraforming of Venus has remained comparatively rare in fiction, though the process appears in works like Bob Buckley's "World in the Clouds" (1980) and G. David Nordley's "The Snows of Venus" (1991), while other such as Raymond Harris's Shadows of the White Sun (1988) and Nordley's "Dawn Venus" (1995) feature an already terraformed, Earth-like Venus. Pamela Sargent's Venus trilogy—consisting of Venus of Dreams (1986), Venus of Shadows (1988), and Child of Venus (2001)—is an epic detailing the generations-long process of terraforming Venus, drawing comparisons to Kim Stanley Robinson's Mars trilogy (1992–1996); Robinson's later novel 2312 (2012) features Venus in the process of being terraformed. A terraformed Venus reverting to its natural state is mentioned in Clarke's The Ghost from the Grand Banks (1991). In anime, the terraforming of Venus appears in the film Venus Wars (1989), where it is precipitated by a comet impact removing atmosphere and adding water to the planet, and the television show Cowboy Bebop (1998), where it is carried out by introduced plant life creating a breathable atmosphere. Gillett suggests that the theme of terraforming Venus reflects a desire to recapture the simpler, traditional fantasy of early prose about the planet.

== Lifeforms ==
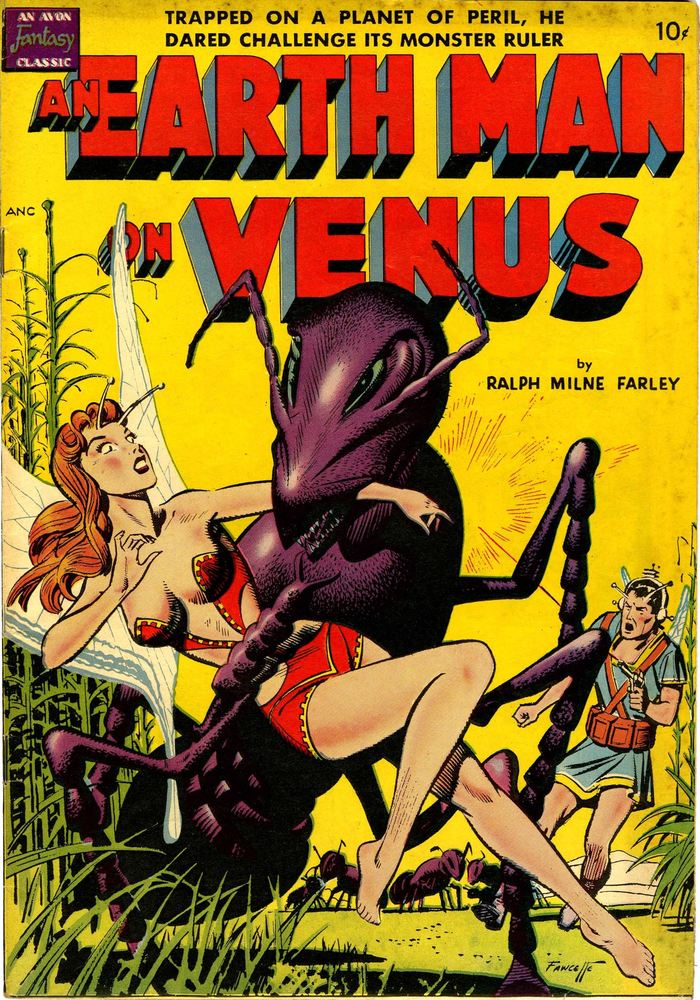
Cover of 1950 Avon comic-book adaptation of The Radio Man, titled An Earth Man on Venus, with the cover featuring exotic Venusian life in the form of gigantic ants

=== Beasts ===
Early writings, in which Venus was often depicted as a younger Earth, often populated it with large beasts. Pope's Journey to Venus (1895) depicted a tropical world featuring dinosaurs and other creatures similar to those known from Earth's history. Says a 2023 article in Space Science Reviews, "While Mars offered a sort of barren elegance, Venus had perhaps too much life." Stanley G. Weinbaum portrayed Venus as home to a voracious ecosystem in "Parasite Planet" (1935), and his visions inspired other authors such as Asimov, whose Lucky Starr and the Oceans of Venus depicts colonists encountering various hostile sea-dwelling creatures. Zelazny's "The Doors of His Face, the Lamps of His Mouth" revolves around an encounter with a giant Venusian sea monster, and in Clarke's The Deep Range (1957) sea creatures on Venus are commercialized. Venus is home to dragons in Heinlein's Between Planets (1951) and to dinosaurs in the Three Stooges short Space Ship Sappy (1957), while a Venusian monster brought to Earth by a space probe attacks humans in the film 20 Million Miles to Earth (1957).

Prehistoric creatures sometimes coexist with primitive humanoids in depictions of Venus. The Green Lantern story "Summons from Space" (1959) features the heroes protecting the human-like inhabitants of Venus from dinosaurs. In the British children's television show Pathfinders to Venus (1961), the local fauna includes both pterodactyls and "apemen". The Soviet film Planeta Bur (1962) features an American–Soviet joint scientific expedition to Venus, which finds the planet teeming with various lifeforms, many resembling terrestrial species, including sentient if primitive Venusians.

Science fiction author Jerry Pournelle noted that early science fiction was rife with images of exotic Venusian life: "thick fungus that ate men alive; a world populated with strange animals, dragons and dinosaurs and swamp creatures resembling the beastie from the Black Lagoon". Sentient plant life appears in several stories including Weinbaum's "Parasite Planet" sequel "The Lotus Eaters" (1935), the Superman comic book story "The Three Tough Teen-Agers" (1962) by Jerry Siegel and Al Plastino, and The Outer Limits episode "Cold Hands, Warm Heart" (1964).A sentient Venusian worm called Mister Mind appears as a supervillain in the Fawcett Comics stories about Captain Marvel. In the second half of the 20th century, as the hellish conditions of Venus became better known, depictions of life on Venus became more exotic, with ideas such as the "living petroleum" of Brenda Pearce's "Crazy Oil" (1975), the telepathic jewels of Varley's "In the Bowl", and the more mundane cloud-borne microbes of Ben Bova's Venus (2000; part of Bova's Grand Tour series).

=== Venusians ===
In contrast to the diversity of visions of the Venusian environment, the inhabitants of Venus are most commonly portrayed as human, or human-like. The catalogue of early (pre-1936) science fiction works compiled by Everett Franklin Bleiler and Richard Bleiler in the reference works Science-Fiction: The Early Years (1990) and Science-Fiction: The Gernsback Years (1998) lists examples such as winged, angelic people; telepaths; archaic humans ("subhumans"); humans but with wings and antennae; humans with tentacles; furry humans; dwarves; giants; centaurs; fish-men; catpeople; reptilians; rat-men; and plant-men. Some works which portray Venusians as humans explain this by suggesting that Venus was colonized by an ancient, advanced civilization from Earth, such as Atlantis in Warren E. Sanders's "Sheridan Becomes Ambassador" (1932) and Polish science fiction writer Władysław Umiński's Zaziemskie światy (1948) or Ancient Egypt in Jeffery Lloyd Castle's Vanguard to Venus (1957), while the Dan Dare comics that launched in 1950 feature a race of kidnapped humans that have been genetically engineered to survive on Venus. Comics superhero Tommy Tomorrow in "Frame-Up at Planeteer Academy" (1962) has a blue-skinned but otherwise humanoid Venusian sidekick called Lon Vurian. The Bleilers also list a number of more bizarre portrayals of Venusians, such as squid-like; four-legged elephantine beings; intelligent giant bees, beetles, ants and worm larvae; giant monstrous insects; and even "living colors". In Simak's "Tools" (1942), a native Venusian is portrayed as "a blob of disembodied radon gas captured in a lead jar".

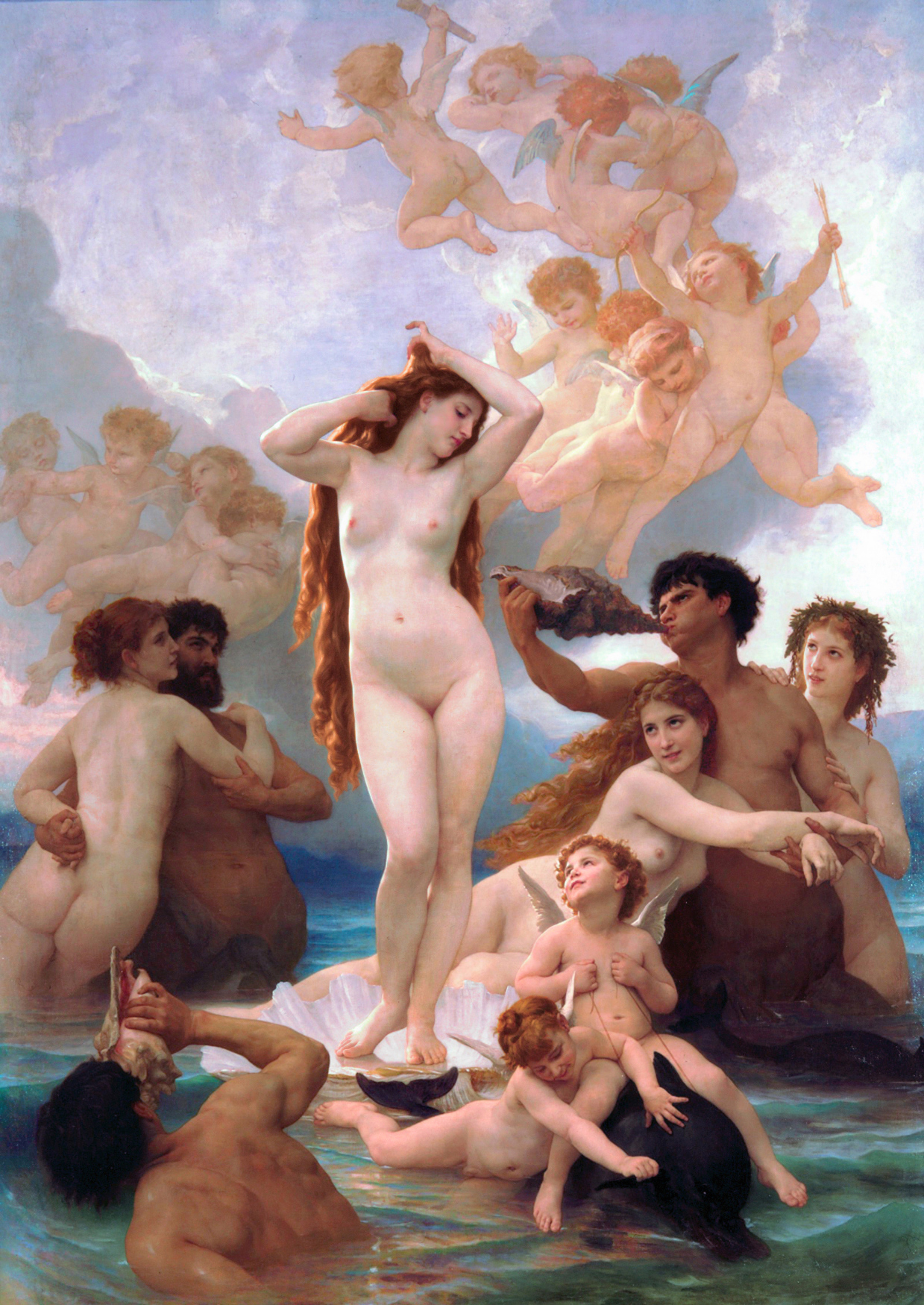
Associations of the planet Venus with the Roman goddess of love may have influenced fictional portrayals of Venusians. Seen here is the 1879 painting The Birth of Venus by William-Adolphe Bouguereau.

Perhaps due to an association of the planet Venus with the Roman goddess of love whose name it shares, sentient Venusians have often been portrayed as gentle, ethereal, and beautiful—an image first presented in Bernard le Bovyer de Fontenelle's Conversations on the Plurality of Worlds (1686). This trope was repeated in W. Lach-Szyrma's A Voice from Another World (1874) and Letters from the Planets (1887–1893), about an interplanetary tour of a winged, angel-like Venusian, as well as in George Griffith's A Honeymoon in Space (1900), where human visitors to Venus encounter flying Venusians communicating through music. The anonymously published A Narrative of the Travels and Adventures of Paul Aermont among the Planets (1873) depicts one Venusian race like this and another which is primitive and violent. Primitive Venusians also appear in Donald Horner's By Aeroplane to the Sun (1910) and Frank Brueckel's The War Lord of Venus (1930), while more advanced yet malicious ones are depicted in works such as Landell Bartlett's "The Vanguard of Venus" (1928) and Roy Rockwood's By Air Express to Venus; or, Captives of a Strange People (1929).

Venusian civilizations have most commonly been depicted as being comparable to Earth's level of development, slightly less frequently as being more advanced, and only occasionally less advanced. Utopian depictions of Venus are commonplace, appearing in John Munro's A Trip to Venus (1897) among others. In terms of governance, James William Barlow's History of a Race of Immortals without a God (1891) features a socialist Venusian civilization, Homer Eon Flint's "The Queen of Life" (1919) depicts an anarchist society on Venus, and Stanton A. Coblentz's The Blue Barbarians (1931) is a satirical depiction of a Venus ruled by plutocrats. The Bleilers additionally list capitalist, feudal, monarchical, and matriarchal Venusian societies, among others. In Polish science fiction writer Stanisław Lem's novel The Astronauts (1951)—later adapted to film as the Polish–East German coproduction The Silent Star (1960) and then dubbed to English and recut as First Spaceship on Venus (1962)—an expedition to Venus discovers a barren environment and the ruins of a civilization, deducing that the cause was nuclear holocaust. Conversely, in Clarke's "History Lesson" (1949) Venusians come to Earth and find humanity already extinct from environmental causes.

The association of Venus with women manifests in different ways in many works. The planet is inhabited solely or mostly by women in works like "What John Smith Saw in the Moon: A Christmas Story for Parties Who Were Children Twenty Years Ago" (1893) by Fred Harvey Brown and ruled by women in Stone's "The Conquest of Gola" (1931) among others. In comic books, several of DC Comics' Wonder Woman stories in the 1940s featured the superheroine's female allies from Venus. The films Abbott and Costello Go to Mars (1953) and Queen of Outer Space (1958) feature the trope of Venus being populated by beautiful women, and Voyage to the Planet of Prehistoric Women (1968), the second of two English-language adaptations of Planeta Bur (the first being Voyage to the Prehistoric Planet, 1965), portrays the Venusians as "half-naked sex-appealing blond sirens" with supernatural or psychic powers.

A theme of a Venusian visitor to Earth is seen in some works, such as Lach-Szyrma's A Voice from Another World and William Windsor's Loma, a Citizen of Venus (1897). The British film Stranger from Venus (1954) portrays a visit by a Venusian in a similar manner to the one by a Martian in the US film The Day the Earth Stood Still (1951). Visits like this are typically peaceful and for the enlightenment of humanity. Occasionally, Venusians come to Earth intent on conquering it, as in Charles L. Graves and E. V. Lucas's parody of H. G. Wells's The War of the Worlds (1897) titled The War of the Wenuses (1898), Ray Cummings's Tarrano the Conqueror (1925), and the film Target Earth (1954). Marvel Comic's Sub-Mariner defended Earth from an invasion by amphibious Venusians in a story arc from the Golden Age of Comic Books. Venusians infiltrating Earth by posing as humans appear in several works including Eric Frank Russell's Three to Conquer (1956) and Windsor's Loma, a Citizen of Venus.

== See also ==
- Planets in astrology § Venus
- Venus in culture
