= Efficiency expert =

Efficiency expert may refer to:

- Scientific management
- Ergonomics expert
- Business efficiency expert
- The Efficiency Expert (novel), a 1921 novel by Edgar Rice Burroughs
- Spotswood (film), known as The Efficiency Expert in the U.S., a 1991 Australian business comedy-drama film
