= Carson of Venus =

1938 science fantasy novel by Edgar Rice Burroughs

- dust-jacket of Carson of Venus
- Author: Edgar Rice Burroughs
- Cover artist: John Coleman Burroughs
- Language: English
- Series: Amtor
- Genre: Science fantasy
- Publisher: Edgar Rice Burroughs, Inc.
- Publication date: 1938
- Publication place: United States
- Media type: Print (hardback & paperback)
- Pages: 312
- Preceded by: Lost on Venus
- Followed by: Escape on Venus

Carson of Venus is a science fantasy novel by American writer Edgar Rice Burroughs, the third book in the Venus series (sometimes called the "Carson Napier of Venus series"). Burroughs wrote the novel in July and August 1937. It was serialized in 1938 in six weekly installments from January 8 to February 12 in Argosy, the same publication where the previous two Venus novels appeared. It was published in book form a year later by Edgar Rice Burroughs, Inc. Burroughs originally submitted the novel to a number of the "slick" magazines: Liberty, The Saturday Evening Post, Collier's, and Ladies' Home Journal. All rejected the story.

The novel, which was written two years before the outbreak of World War II, satirizes Nazi Germany by including a fascist political faction called the "Zani". There is also a character named "Muso" as a reference to Benito Mussolini. Unlike the first two Venus novels, Carson of Venus focuses on spy intrigue and war instead of wilderness adventuring. It also indicates a change of political orientation from that of the earlier books, where the villains were modeled on Russian Communists.

Carson of Venus was nominated for a Retro-Hugo Award for best science fiction novel of 1939. The award went to T. H. White's The Sword in the Stone.

== Copyright ==
The copyright for this story has expired in Australia and in Canada, and thus now resides in the public domain there. The text is available via Project Gutenberg Australia and Faded Page in Canada.
