= Lost on Venus =

1935 novel by Edgar Rice Burroughs

Pirates of Venus
- dust-jacket of Lost on Venus
- Author: Edgar Rice Burroughs
- Language: English
- Series: Amtor
- Genre: Science fantasy
- Publisher: Edgar Rice Burroughs, Inc.
- Publication date: 1935
- Publication place: United States
- Media type: Print (hardback & paperback)
- Pages: 318
- Preceded by: Pirates of Venus
- Followed by: Carson of Venus

Lost On Venus is a science fantasy novel by American writer Edgar Rice Burroughs, the second book in the Venus series (sometimes called the "Carson Napier of Venus series" or the "Amtor series"). It was first serialized in the magazine Argosy in 1933 and published in book form two years later. The plot of this novel begins with the main character named Carson Napier stuck in the Room of the Seven Doors, with six out of the seven doors leading to death and only one leading to life. He eventually escapes this logic puzzle and continues his journey.

== Copyright ==
The copyright for this story has expired in Australia, Canada and the United States, and thus now resides in the public domain in those countries. The text is available via Project Gutenberg Australia and Faded Page.
