= Clash by Night (disambiguation) =

Clash by Night is a 1952 American film noir drama.

Clash by Night may also refer to:

- Clash by Night (play)
- Clash by Night (1963 film)
- "Clash by Night" (short story)
- "Clash by Night" (Altered Carbon)
