= The Girl from Hollywood =

Novel by Edgar Rice Burroughs

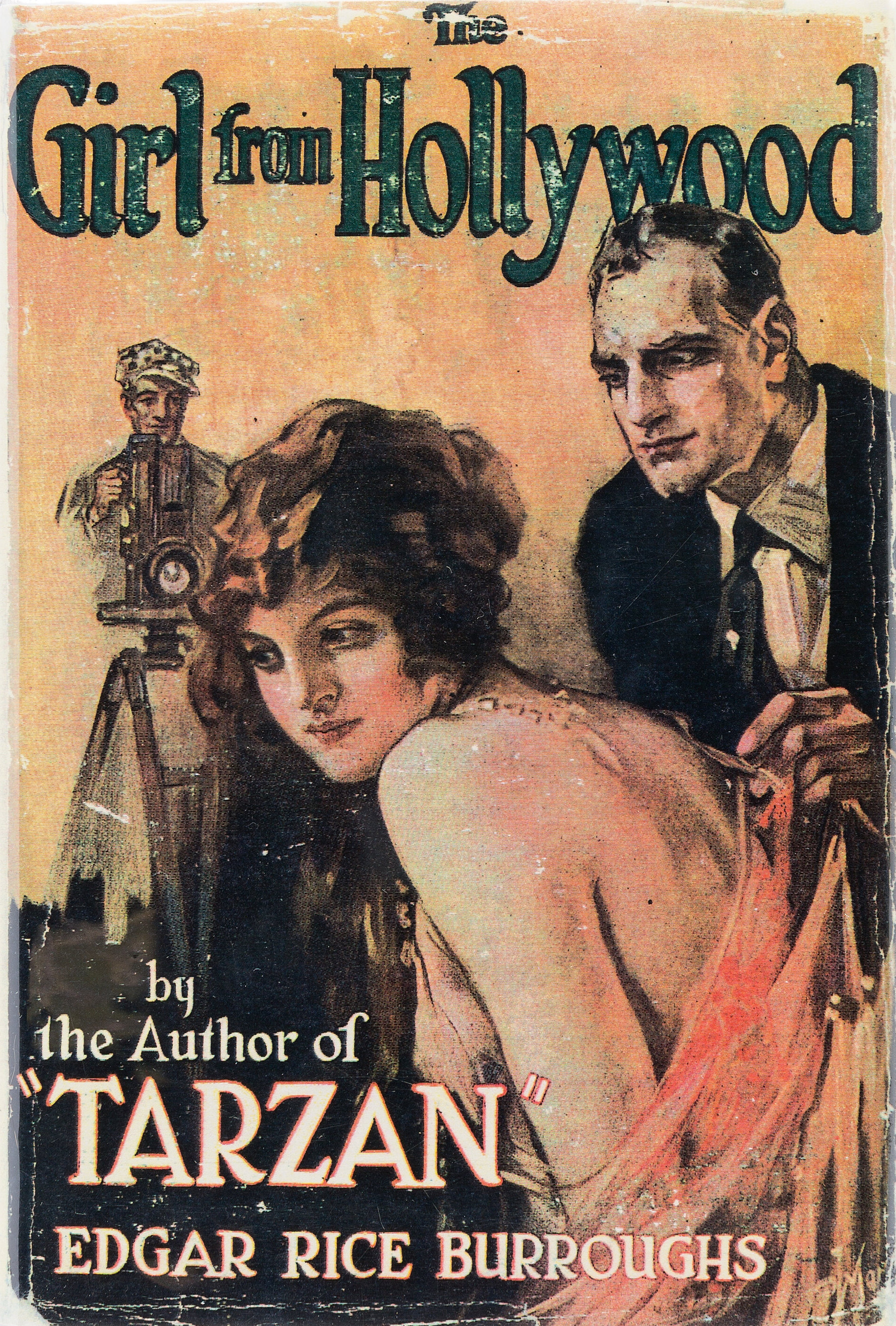
- dust-jacket of The Girl from Hollywood
- Author: Edgar Rice Burroughs
- Language: English
- Genre: Fiction
- Publisher: Munsey's Magazine
- Publication date: Jun to Nov 1922
- Publication place: United States

The Girl from Hollywood is an Edgar Rice Burroughs contemporary fiction novel. The Girl from Hollywood was published as a serial by Munsey's Magazine from June to November, 1922. The book version was first published by Macaulay Co. on 10 August 1923.

The working title was "The Penningtons."

== Plot summary ==
The story alternates between the all-American Pennington family on their remote California ranch and a young Hollywood actress.

The Penningtons have a beautiful estate, and affectionate relationships with their children, Custer and Eva. Custer has had an "understanding" with neighbor and childhood friend Grace Evans for a long time, but she finally confides that she wants to try being an actress before she agrees to settle down on the ranch. Her brother Guy is an aspiring writer. He has just purchased some bootleg booze, and shares it with Custer, although both Grace and Custer's mother have observed that he has a drinking problem.

Bit-part actress Shannon Burke, known on the screen as Gaza de Lure, remembers her Hollywood history. She had come for fame, but refused to trade sexual favors for work, and found that she could not get better roles. Actor-director Wilson Crumb was the first to behave decently to her, as a gentleman. He got her a contract with his company, and gradually increased his attentions to her. Finally, he gave her powder, saying it was aspirin, and over several days intentionally got her hooked on cocaine. To keep her drug supply steady she angrily agreed to visit him during the day, but refused to live with him, going home each night to her own place. Eventually, she began selling cocaine, morphine and heroin for him.

Guy Evans is in love with Custer's sister Eva Pennington, but does not have an income to support her. Slick Allen, briefly employed by the Pennington ranch, asks Guy to help with his bootleg operation. After he threatens the Penningtons, Guy rejects the proposal ... and Allen threatens to frame him for the entire bootleg business. Lured by the money, Guy decides to cooperate, arranging to store and transfer illegal goods each week in a remote section of the ranch. Meanwhile, Grace has had no luck in Hollywood, finding it difficult to get any work at all. Sent to Wilson Crumb, he diffidently offers her a semi-nude part requiring a nude audition, and in a weak moment, she accepts. The other side of Slick Allen's smuggling operation is drugs ... sold through Wilson Crumb in Hollywood. Shannon witnesses Allen demanding payment from Crumb. Crumb has been putting him off, and finally arranges for Allen to be arrested for possession of drugs.

By insisting on a share of the profits, Shannon has saved enough to buy a home for her mother in the country, near a big ranch – coincidentally, the Pennington's. Shannon's mother gets sick and they send for her. She carefully brings enough drugs to last a week. Her mother is dead when she arrives, so the Penningtons take her in. With decent people, fresh air and exercise, she weans herself from the drug and then entirely kicks her secret habit. She also falls in love with Custer. In Hollywood, Wilson Crumb follows his previously successful method to hook Grace on drugs as well. The folks at home hear from her less often.

When Shannon learns about Grace, knowing what Hollywood can be like for a girl with no family to care, she insists someone should go see her. Custer has become aware of mysterious traffic on the ranch, and plans to catch them. Shannon recognises Slick Allen's voice from his meeting with Wilson Crumb, and fears for Custer's safety. She approaches the bootleggers to try to prevent a confrontation, but only makes matters worse. The government finds Custer with the booze, and he is arrested. Although he learns of Guy's involvement, he chooses to accept six months in prison rather than let his sister be disillusioned with Guy. Custer tries to see Grace but she throws him out, pretending she dislikes him. The next day, Guy arrives too late; Grace dies of injuries from domestic abuse, an out of wedlock pregnancy, and drug abuse. A photo on her dresser is Guy's only clue to the guilty man.

As months go by, the families recover from losing Grace. Eva arranges for a movie company to shoot some scenes at the ranch, at the request of ... Wilson Crumb. Shannon is appalled. On the ranch, Crumb confronts Shannon, insisting she come back to him. Custer overhears their conversation, and gets drunk. Crumb tries to lure Eva out for an "audition", but she is horrified when he makes a pass. Angry, he tells her that Guy was the guilty bootlegger, who let her innocent brother go to jail for it.

The next morning, Shannon is seen sweeping away tracks on the trail. Within hours, Crumb is found dead. Shannon claims responsibility but has no gun. Custer had a gun, but was passed out drunk and doesn't remember getting up, let alone killing him. Eva shoots herself over Crumb's allegations about Guy, and is found barely alive. Guy becomes so upset and disoriented when he learns about Eva's suicide attempt that he is taken to a sanatorium (mental hospital) Custer and Shannon are both arrested. There is a lot of circumstantial evidence against Custer. Shannon's sordid Hollywood past comes out during the trial.

Custer is found guilty and sentenced to death. Shannon is found innocent due to inability to produce a murder weapon. The Penningtons do not hold Shannon's past against her. Eva recovers, and the family frequently visits Custer. On the fatal day, the governor grants a stay of execution. Shannon had been working with Guy at the hospital every day, and he finally recovered his memory. Guy confessed to killing Crumb himself in revenge for Grace's death. Additionally, Slick Allen explained that he planted some of the circumstantial evidence against Custer, but decided to admit it after he realised that Shannon is his long-lost daughter.

== Commentary ==
Burroughs wrote only a handful of contemporary novels, finding greater success in his heroic fiction and science fiction. Unlike his more popular books, this story boasts no gleaming hero and heroine, since both have been entangled by substance abuse. At the time of this story, Burroughs was familiar with Hollywood since several of his novels had already been brought to film.

In Tarzan Forever, biographer John Taliaferro explains that the Pennington's Ranch resembles Burroughs's own Tarzana, California home: "Rancho del Ganado is Tarzana to the last detail; the description of roads, trails, topography, and architecture verge on the encyclopedic - and thus have great historical value for anyone trying to picture the original Tarzana before it became suburbia."

== Public Domain status ==
The copyright for this story has expired in the United States as a published work from 1923 and in other countries where the term of copyright is life+70. The text is available via Project Gutenberg Australia, Faded Page (Canada) and at the main Project Gutenberg.
