= Patrick H. Adkins =

American author (1948–2015)

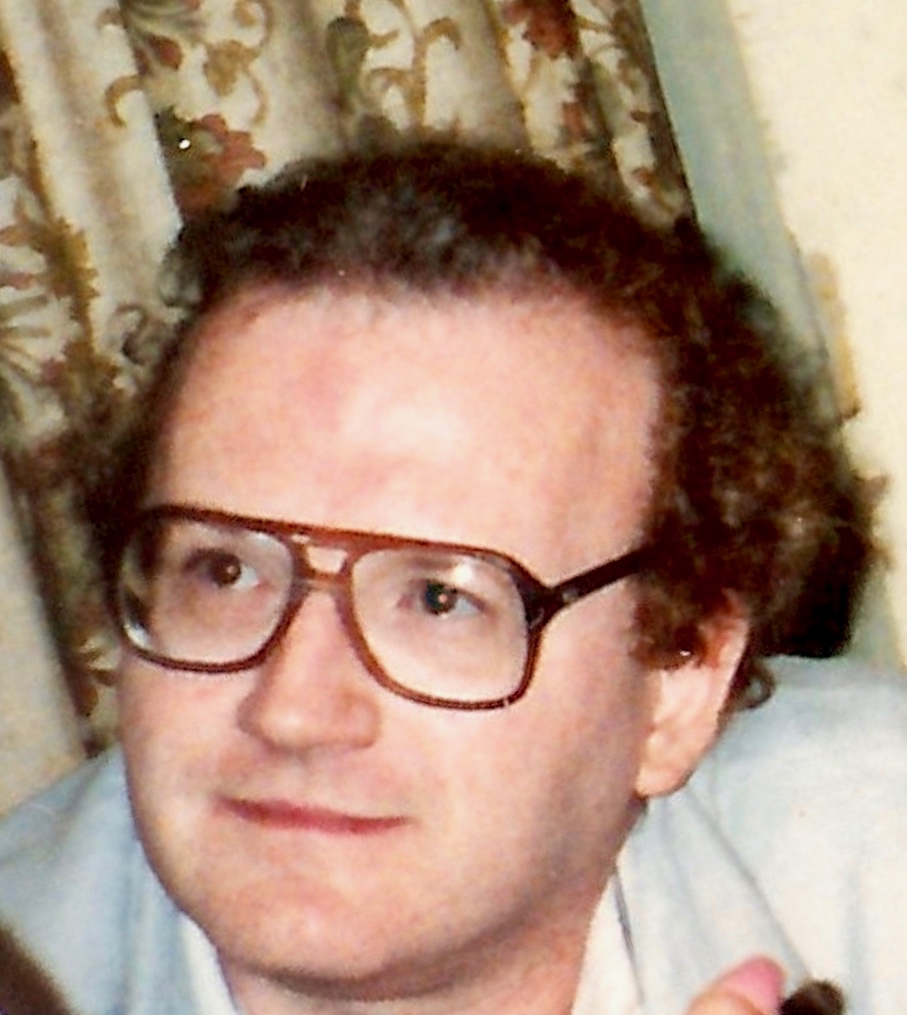
- Pat Adkins in 1990
- Born: January 9, 1948; New Orleans, Louisiana
- Died: April 7, 2015 (aged 67); Gretna, Louisiana
- Occupations: Author, editor
- Writing career
- Genre: Fantasy

Patrick H. Adkins (January 9, 1948 – April 7, 2015) was an American fantasy author and editor best known for his mythological fantasies.

In addition to his writing he has worked as "a bookseller, small press publisher, 'slush pile' reader for Galaxy magazine, medical and technical editor and writer, freelance writer, story doctor, ghost writer, editor-in-chief of a multimedia publishing company, and software expert." Together with fellow science fiction fan John H. Guidry he launched the "Tarzana Project" to print the unpublished and uncollected works of Edgar Rice Burroughs under the imprint of Guidry & Adkins.

== Bibliography ==
=== Titan series ===
- Lord of the Crooked Paths (1987)
- Master of the Fearful Depths (1989)
- Sons of the Titans (1990)

=== Other novels ===
- The Third Beast (2000)

=== Short stories ===
- "Hunting the Dragonblood" (1981)
