= Escape on Venus =

1946 novel by Edgar Rice Burroughs

- Dust jacket of Escape on Venus
- Author: Edgar Rice Burroughs
- Cover artist: John Coleman Burroughs
- Language: English
- Series: Amtor
- Genre: Science fantasy
- Publisher: Edgar Rice Burroughs, Inc.
- Publication date: 1946
- Publication place: United States
- Media type: Print (hardback & paperback)
- Pages: 347
- Preceded by: Carson of Venus
- Followed by: The Wizard of Venus

Escape on Venus is a science fantasy novel by American writer Edgar Rice Burroughs, the fourth book in the Venus series (Sometimes called the "Carson Napier of Venus series"). It consists of four interconnected stories published in Fantastic Adventures between 1941 and 1942: "Slaves of the Fish Men", "Goddess of Fire", "The Living Dead," and "War on Venus". A collected edition of these stories was published in 1946.

== Copyright ==
The copyright for this story has expired in Australia, and thus now resides in the public domain there. The text is available via Project Gutenberg Australia.

== Original stories ==
- "Slaves of the Fish Men", March 1941
- "Goddess of Fire", July 1941
- "The Living Dead", November 1941
- "War on Venus", March 1942
