= Beyond the Farthest Star (novel) =

Novel by Edgar Rice Burroughs

- Author: Edgar Rice Burroughs
- Cover artist: Frank Frazetta
- Language: English
- Genre: Science fiction
- Publisher: Ace Books
- Publication date: 1964
- Publication place: United States

Beyond the Farthest Star is a science fiction novel by American writer Edgar Rice Burroughs. The novel consists of two novellas, "Adventure on Poloda" and "Tangor Returns", written quickly in late 1940. The first was published in The Blue Book Magazine in 1942, but the second did not see publication until 1964 when it was featured in Tales of Three Planets along with "The Resurrection of Jimber-Jaw" and The Wizard of Venus.

Burroughs likely intended Beyond the Farthest Star to be the opening of a new series comparable to the Barsoom or Pellucidar sequences, but declining health and Burroughs's World War II service as a war correspondent prevented this from happening. However, the story saw new life in 1972, when it was adapted by comics writer Marv Wolfman and artist Dan Green as one of the back-ups in DC Comics' version of the Tarzan comic book; the story itself lasted until January 1973 (issues #212–218, then Tarzan Family #61). This is the only known comics version to date.

In 2021, Edgar Rice Burroughs, Inc. released a restored edition of Beyond the Farthest Star. Comparison with Burroughs’ original typescript showed that the 1942 magazine publication was heavily edited, with a substantial number of line edits on almost every page, and several lengthy and meaningful passages—some more than a page long—excised throughout. That altered and abridged text had been used as the basis for all succeeding book editions of the novel.

== Copyright ==
The copyright for this story has expired in Australia, and thus now resides in the public domain there. The text is available via Project Gutenberg Australia.
