= The Lad and the Lion =

Novel by Edgar Rice Burroughs

- First edition cover.
- Author: Edgar Rice Burroughs
- Cover artist: John Coleman Burroughs
- Language: English
- Genre: Novel
- Publisher: Edgar Rice Burroughs, Inc.
- Publication date: 1938
- Publication place: United States
- Media type: Print (Hardcover)
- Pages: 317

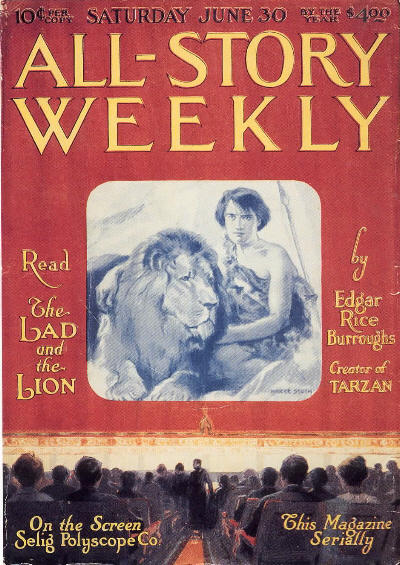
The Lad and the Lion was serialized in All Story Weekly in 1917.

The Lad and the Lion is an adventure novel by American writer Edgar Rice Burroughs, written in February 1914. His working title for the piece was "Men and Beasts." It was first published as a three-part serial in All-Story Weekly in the issues for June 30, July 7, and July 14, 1917. The story was the first by Burroughs adapted to film, the movie appearing about the same time as the print serial. Despite this distinction, the story did not appear in book form for over twenty years; only after a remake of the film appeared was the first book edition published, by Burroughs's own publishing firm, Edgar Rice Burroughs, Inc., in February 1938. The text was apparently expanded for book publication, as certain incidentals of the story reflect the political situation of Europe in the late 1930s rather than the mid-1910s. The book was reprinted by Grosset & Dunlap in 1939 and Canaveral Press in 1964. The first paperback edition was issued by Ballantine Books in September 1964, with a second appearing from Ace Books in May 1974, reprinted in June 1982.

== Plot ==
=== Introduction (chapter 1) ===
When the king of a small European country is murdered by conspirators, his young grandson and heir Prince Michael is spirited away by a faithful retainer, carrying out the orders of the dead king, who had wind of what might be afoot. The diverging fates of Michael and his former country then unfold in parallel, in alternating chapters.

=== Michael's story (even-numbered chapters, 2-24) ===
The ship the prince is put aboard is wrecked in a storm and he is injured and swept overboard. Climbing aboard an empty lifeboat, he is rescued by a mad, epileptic old man piloting a tramp steamer. Also aboard is a caged lion. The old man beats the prince and tortures the lion, keeping them prisoner on the craft for years. Michael, his memory gone, makes friends with the lion, which ultimately breaks free and kills their tormentor. The steamer, now adrift, eventually strikes shore on the coast of northern Africa.

The lad and the lion live and hunt together in the wild at the margin of the jungle and desert. Eventually they encounter a band of Arabs, whose flocks they prey on. They rescue Nakhla, daughter of the Arabs' chieftain Sheik Ali-Es-Hadji, from marauders and return her to the band. Afterward she meets with Michael secretly, dissuading him from raiding her people and gradually teaching him how to speak and dress as an Arab, shoot, and ride a horse. As he cannot even remember his own name, she dubs him Aziz. The lion, meanwhile, has taken up with a lioness, giving Michael two lion friends. Eventually the Arab warrior Ben Saada, who desires Nakhla, discovers her meetings with Michael and informs her father. The two proceed to separate the pair, the sheik by forbidding Nakhla to visit him, and Ben Saada by lying to Michael that she has married another and is no longer interested in him.

Afterward Michael encounters two Arabs who have abducted another girl, Marie, daughter of a French officer. He saves her and returns her to the French camp while his lions dispatch her captors. There, as the guest of her father Colonel Joseph Vivier, he learns French and tells his story to his new friends. His past prior to his sojourn on the steamer is still a blank to him. Later, visiting the Arab camp in their company, he meets Nakhla again, but she, seeing him with Marie, will have nothing to do with him. This hardly frees him to court Marie, however. Back with the French he learns that both the colonel and the wife of another officer, who has taken Marie under her wing, disapprove of their friendship. Hurt, he returns to the wild, determined to confront Nakhla; Marie, in parting, has told him she observed the Arab girl was not married, and reveals that Aziz, the name she had given him, means "beloved."

Followed by his lions, Michael confronts the sheik and demands to see Nakhla. Refused, he claims to be the brother of el adrea (the lion) and threatens to resume predation on the herds. The sheik then discovers she is missing, kidnapped by Ben Saada, whose hand she has refused. An emissary from Ben Saada arrives, offering to negotiate; the sheik refuses, and swears vengeance should any harm come to his daughter. Michael trails the messenger back to Ben Saada. Meanwhile, Nakhla has escaped, only to be captured in turn by the Arab marauders of Sidi-El-Seghir, who decide to sell her into slavery. Michael now follows her new captors and attempts to free her, only to be taken in turn. His lions prowl about the camp as Nakhla tends the injured Michael's wounds.

Then the marauders are attacked by the French. In the confusion, Sidi-El-Seghir rides off with the captives, only to be set upon by the two lions. Michael kills the bandit. He compares note with Nakhla, and Ben Saada's lies are revealed. The couple reconciles, and the sheik afterward agrees to the match. The lions depart when Michael passes out from his wounds, thinking him dead. When he revives he finds his memory restored, but decides to stay with Nakhla rather than attempt to recover his heritage.

=== The kingdom's story (odd-numbered chapters, 3-23) ===
The murdered king's brother Prince Otto, one of the conspirators, succeeds him, but he and his spoiled son Prince Ferdinand are disliked by the people. His accomplice Sarnya has been rewarded by promotion to chief of staff as General Count Sarnya. Three new conspirators, Andresy, Bulvik and Carlyn, emerge in opposition. Bulvik attempts to assassinate Sarnya but fails, and is fatally shot in turn.

Prince Ferdinand becomes enamored of Hilda de Groot, the pretty daughter of the head gardener, but makes an enemy in her brother Hans. Years pass. Andresy and Carlyn plot against the king, while Hans plots against Ferdinand. He reveals the prince's infatuation to King Otto, opening a rift in the royal family. An exile, Count Maximilian Lomsk, who wishes to return and is ambitious for Sarnya's position, is encouraged by Andresy to communicate with Ferdinand. Through their machinations Carlyn is reinstated as a lieutenant in the army, which he hopes to parlay into a position of captain of the guard from which he can strike at the king and prince.

King Otto attempts to shore up the realm's faltering finances and counter Ferdinand's continuing liaison with Hilda by betrothing him to the wealthy Maria, princess of a neighboring country. Ferdinand resists at first, but eventually marries her. They quickly come to hate each other. The conspirators' plan proceeds. Carlyn, who has achieved his post close to the king, accompanies him to inspect a cavalry regiment. William Wesl, a patsy of the conspirators, is sent to the palace with a letter. As he approaches King Otto and Captain Carlyn the latter shoots the king with a gun stolen from Hans and throws it at the feet of Wesl. Doubly implicated as the assassin by the letter he unwitting bears, Wesl is arrested and executed.

Ferdinand, now king, continues to alienate the people. He sacks Sarnya, placing Maximilian Lomsk in his position, and makes Hilda lady in waiting to Queen Maria. The queen, offended, returns to her own country, but by threatening to take her money with her forestalls Ferdinand from divorcing her to marry Hilda. Ferdinand plans war against Maria's country, while Andresy plots a coup against the monarchy together with six army officers. Andresy's intention is to set up a republic with himself as head and the now-aggrieved General Count Sarnya as head of the army. Meanwhile, Wesl's wife, realizing her husband was set up by Captain Carlyn, feigns falling in love with the captain.

All comes to a head on the date set for the coup. The six officers assassinate Ferdinand and Hilda. Hans, hearing of his sister's death, commits suicide. Wesl's wife murders Captain Carlyn.

=== Conclusion (chapter 25) ===
At the end of the novel the two plot threads touch briefly. Aziz, formerly Prince Michael, is still living in Africa and now happily wed to Nakhla. He reads that Count Sarnya has seized power in his former country and made himself dictator. He cables the new ruler as follows: "Congratulations! You have my sympathy — Michael."

== Film adaptations ==
The Lad and the Lion was the first by Burroughs adapted to film, as a five-reel black and white silent movie released by the Selig Polyscope Company, premiering May 14, 1917, roughly simultaneously with the print serial. The film makes Michael the son of an American millionaire rather than a European prince, dropping the parallel plot and focusing exclusively on the sea and African adventures of the lad and the lion.

The film was later remade as The Lion Man (1936), an even looser adaptation with much less resemblance to the original story.

== Copyright ==
The copyright for this story has expired in the United States and, thus, now resides in the public domain there.
