= Pirates of Venus =

1932 novel by Edgar Rice Burroughs

- Dust-jacket of Pirates of Venus
- Author: Edgar Rice Burroughs
- Cover artist: J. Allen St. John
- Language: English
- Series: Amtor
- Genre: Science fantasy
- Publisher: Edgar Rice Burroughs, Inc.
- Publication date: 1932
- Publication place: United States
- Media type: Print (hardback & paperback)
- Pages: 314
- Followed by: Lost on Venus

Pirates of Venus is a science fantasy novel by American writer Edgar Rice Burroughs, the first book in the Venus series (also called the "Carson Napier of Venus series"), the last major series in Burroughs's career (the other major series were Tarzan, Barsoom, and Pellucidar). It was first serialized in six parts in the United States in Argosy in 1932 and in the United Kingdom in The Passing Show in 1933 and published in book form in 1934 by Edgar Rice Burroughs, Inc. The events occur on a fictionalized version of the planet Venus, known as "Amtor" to its inhabitants.

The novel contains elements of political satire aimed at communism. The novel's villains, the Thorists, start a revolution in the nation of Vepaja for their own good only, cheating the uneducated masses and killing or driving away those doctors and other highly educated that form the foundation of the society. Throughout the book the Thorists remain distant and unreal, and those few that the hero Carson Napier meets are often stupid or incompetent. The Kalkars, villains of Burroughs's other novel The Moon Maid, were also modeled on the Russian Communists.

== Reception ==
Wonder Stories in 1934 recommended the novel, saying that "the plot of the story is nothing new, [but] a master of fantasy, such as Burroughs, can . . . keep the story absorbing from the first page to the last". Floyd C. Gale of Galaxy Science Fiction in 1963 said that "despite his usual penchant for coincidence and gratuitously fortuitous happenstances (whew!), his power of invention in the realm of pure adventure remains keen throughout the Venusian series".

== Copyright ==
The copyright for this story has expired in Australia, Canada and the United States, and thus now resides in the public domain in those countries. The text is available via Project Gutenberg Australia, Faded Page, Canada, Project Gutenberg and Standard Ebooks.

== Influence on later writers ==
Poul Anderson, in the Dominic Flandry novel A Plague of Masters, depicts a community of dissidents and rebels against a tyrannical regime, living on the branches of enormous giant trees - strongly reminiscent of the setting in Pirates of Venus.
