= The Bandit of Hell's Bend =

1924 Western novel by Edgar Rice Burroughs

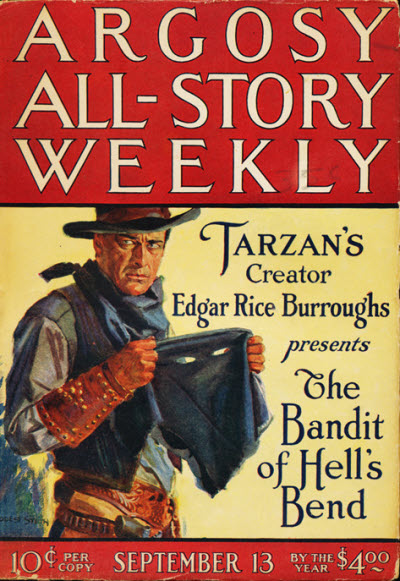
- The Bandit of Hell's Bend installment as featured in Argosy All-Story Weekly (September 13, 1924)
- Author: Edgar Rice Burroughs
- Language: English
- Genre: Western fiction
- Publisher: A. C. McClurg
- Publication date: 4 June 1925
- Publication place: United States
- Media type: Print (Hardback)
- Pages: 414 pp

The Bandit of Hell's Bend is a Western fiction novel by American writer Edgar Rice Burroughs, published in serial form in the Argosy All-Story Weekly in September and October 1924. The book version was first published by A. C. McClurg on June 4, 1925.

The novel is one of four Westerns that Burroughs wrote. He had two working titles for it: "The Black Coyote" and "Diana of the Bar Y".

== Plot summary ==
Elias Henders is the prosperous owner of a ranch and a gold mine. Competing for his daughter Diana, ranch hand Colby sabotages recovering alcoholic foreman Bull, and takes his job. The local stage is repeatedly robbed of gold bullion from the owner's mine, and Bull is suspected. The cowardly sheriff does not take action on the robberies. Rich Easterner Wainwright tries to buy the mine and ranch for a low price, but Henders refuses the offer and discusses the property's true value with Diana. She is intrigued by Wainwright's Eastern-educated son Jefferson, who proposes marriage. However, when they are attacked by Indians during the roundup, he runs rather than defend her. Henders is mortally wounded in the battle.

Henders will bequeaths his property to his brother John back East so that he can take care of Diana, but John dies too. The Wainwrights pretend that Henders had agreed to a sale, but Diana knows better. Diana's Eastern cousin Lillian brings Corson, a lawyer, to try to seize the ranch and gold mine. They insist that the ranch and mine are nearly played out, and that they should sell the property, offering her a small amount. They show their ignorance about western ways. Bull encourages Diana that the property is worth more than they say, and advises her that the Wainwrights are often at the mine. The Eastern lawyer finally announces that Diana has no property rights due to the wills.

As pressure from the opposing forces builds, a mob goes to hang Bull for the stage robberies, but Diana warns him in time. Bull discovers there are papers that will prove Diana's claim to the property, and that Lillian has seduced Colby to obtain his help. Bull actually does rob the stage, simply to obtain the papers supporting Diana. Diana recognizes him at the robbery, and is devastated because she is starting to have feelings for him. She orders the Wainwrights, Lillian and Corson off the property, and fires Colby.

Bull has the Mexican Gregorio deliver the important papers to Diana, showing that Lillian is not related to John and thus not entitled to the property. The villains try to take over the ranch. Bull catches Colby robbing the bullion stage, and has him watched in town, but he is released by the sheriff and his friends. Colby kidnaps Diana and heads for Mexico. He claims to be rescuing her, but she knows that she does not love him. Bull follows her doggedly, and eventually rescues her. They return to town, stop the illegal title transfers and announce their impending marriage.

== Copyright ==
The copyright for this story expired in Australia before the American copyright did and it thus entered the public domain earlier there; the text is available via Project Gutenberg Australia. The story entered the public domain in the United States on January 1, 2021.

== Comic strip adaptation ==
Al Martin Napoletano made a comic strip adaptation of The Bandit of Hell's Bend for The Jasoomian.
