= The Wizard of Venus =

1964 novel by Edgar Rice Burroughs

- First edition
- Author: Edgar Rice Burroughs
- Cover artist: Roy G. Krenkel, Jr.
- Language: English
- Series: Amtor
- Genre: Science fantasy
- Publisher: Ace Books
- Publication date: 1964
- Publication place: United States
- Media type: Print Paperback)
- Pages: 136
- Preceded by: Escape on Venus

The Wizard of Venus is a science fiction novella by American writer Edgar Rice Burroughs, as well as the title of a collection in which it was later published together with an unrelated story. "The Wizard of Venus" is the final story in Burroughs's Venus series (sometimes called the "Carson Napier of Venus series"). Written in 1941, the piece remained unpublished until 1964, fourteen years after the author's death. Burroughs intended it to be the opening piece in a sequence of stories to be brought together later in book form, as he had done in the instance of the previous Venus volume, Escape on Venus. He began the first follow-up tale, only to abandon the project in the wake of the Japanese attack on Pearl Harbor; the text of the aborted sequel is now lost.

== Publication history ==
"The Wizard of Venus" was first published in the 1964 Burroughs collection Tales of Three Planets together with the unrelated tales "The Resurrection of Jimber-Jaw", "Beyond the Farthest Star" and "Tangor Returns". Afterwards, it appeared in the collection The Wizard of Venus (Ace Books, August 1970). This also included the unrelated pirate adventure "Pirate Blood." A subsequent British edition (New English Library, 1975) omitted the unrelated story.

== Plot summary ==
- "The Wizard of Venus". Carson Napier is trapped in the castle of an insane Venusian "wizard" who holds the local population in thrall through the use of hypnotic powers. Napier, who is possessed of comparable powers he has hitherto utilized solely to transmit his account of his Venusian adventures back to Earth, successfully counters the tyrant and frees his victims.
- "Pirate Blood". Johnny LaFitte of Glenora, California, a 20th-century descendant of the New Orleans pirate Jean Lafitte, finds himself thrown by a bizarre set of events into his ancestor's profession. The author's depiction of modern-day piracy is replete with cold-blooded murder and rapine, but overall the tale is a semi-serious takeoff on the theory that heredity equals destiny.

== Reception ==
A reviewer wrote: " this would have only been just the first adventure in the book if Burroughs had got around to finishing it, but as is it’s still really quite good. Carson and Ero Shan’s buddy adventure in this land is fun as they take on the roles of Sir Galahad and Sir Gawain in the medieval adventure and making it one of the more lighthearted and goofy chapters in the series."

A review at StrangerthanSF noted: "It is forgivable maybe for Burroughs to use this mental power of Carson's as a storytelling device but to never have Carson use it in his adventures. It's not forgivable for Burroughs to suddenly switch the rules on us and have Carson start using his remarkable abilities. It makes all his previous adventures inconsistent..."
