= Venus series =

1934–1964 series of five books by Edgar Rice Burroughs

Amtor/Venus Series
- Pirates of Venus, first edition
- Pirates of Venus (1934); Lost on Venus (1935); Carson of Venus (1939); Escape on Venus (1946); The Wizard of Venus (1964)
- Author: Edgar Rice Burroughs
- Country: USA
- Language: English
- Published: 1934-1964
- No. of books: 5

The Venus series (or Amtor series) is a science fantasy series consisting of four novels and one novelette written by American author Edgar Rice Burroughs. Most of the stories were first serialized in Argosy, an American pulp magazine. It is sometimes known as the Carson Napier of Venus series, after its main character, Carson Napier. Napier attempted a solo voyage to Mars, but, because of mistaken navigational calculations, he finds himself heading toward the planet Venus instead. The novels, part of the sword and planet subgenre of science fiction, follow earthman Napier's fantastic adventures after he crash-lands on Venus, called Amtor by its human-like inhabitants. Unlike Barsoom, the desert planet of Mars, these stories are set upon a waterworld like Earth. Most of the events of the series take place on the island of Vepaja, the kingdom of Korva on the island of Anlap, and the city-states of Havatoo and Kormor on the tropical continent north of Vepaja.

As is common in Burroughs's works, the hero is bold and daring, and quickly wins the heart of the Vepajan princess (or janjong) Duare, though class prejudices long inhibit her from expressing her love. Napier meets many varied people, including the Vepajans, refugees from an overthrown empire; the Thorists, thinly disguised communists who ran the Vepajans out of what is now the Thoran empire; pirates; the super-scientific eugenicists of Havatoo; the zombies of Kormor; the fascistic Zanis of Korva; and the hideous Cloud People.

In the course of his adventures within the series, Napier becomes a pirate (twice), escapes from the dread Room of the Seven Doors, and is finally made a prince, or tanjong, of Korva after the overthrow of the Zanis. Napier also rescues princesses from incomparable dangers innumerable times.

== Series ==
=== Original books ===
- Pirates of Venus (1932)
- Lost on Venus (1933)
- Carson of Venus (1938)
- Escape on Venus (1946)
- The Wizard of Venus (1964) (novella)

In 2011, the Edgar Rice Burroughs estate commissioned a sixth Amtor novel, Skies of Venus: A Novel of Amtor, from writer Neal Romanek, which was released in 2022.

In January 2020 Carson of Venus: The Edge of All Worlds by Matt Betts was published.

=== Adaptations and spinoffs ===
When DC Comics had adaptation rights to various Burroughs series, they did an adaptation of Pirates of Venus (in Korak, Son of Tarzan #46–53, partially reprinted in Tarzan Family #60–65) and started an adaptation of Lost on Venus (in Korak #54–56 and Tarzan #230), with art by Michael Kaluta.

Later, Dark Horse Comics obtained adaptation rights to the Burroughs series, and in 1995 published a four-issue miniseries crossover, Tarzan/Carson of Venus, written by Darko Macan and illustrated by Igor Kordej. It was collected into a trade paperback in 1999.

In 2004 an option for the entire Venus series were secured by Angelic Entertainment, Inc. a film production company based in San Diego, California. They have since lost the option rights to this property. The entire Venus Series property is under option by Jupiter 9 Productions, which is developing the books as a series of features.

== Plot ==
=== Setting ===
Amtor
- Pirates of Venus location
- 1934 map of Amtor drawn by Burroughs for the end-papers of his Venus books.
- Created by: Edgar Rice Burroughs
- Genre: Planetary romance

In-universe information
- Type: Planet
- Races: Vepajans, Havatoo, Kormor, Angans, Cloud People, Nobargans, Samary, Thorists, Zanis
- Locations: Vepaja, Hanatoo, Kormor, Korva, Morov
- Characters: Carson Napier, Duare

Amtor is a cloud-covered world with a primarily oceanic southern hemisphere known as Trabol, where large islands and two continents, Thora and a smaller northern landmass, dominate the landscape. The planet’s unusual geography includes massive vegetation, giant animals, and dangerous fauna, limiting exploration. Amtorians hold a bizarre cosmology, believing the world is a flat disc or hemisphere floating on lava, leading to warped maps and a lack of celestial navigation. With no clear understanding of the northern hemisphere, they rely on a pseudo-scientific theory to reconcile their geographical misconceptions.

On Amtor, the human natives range from the sophisticated, long-lived Vepajans, to hostile and often violent groups like the Thorists, Angans, and Nobargans. The Thorists, who overthrew the Vepajans, struggle with decay and inefficiency, while the Vepajans, possessing advanced technology and longevity serums, live isolated on a remote island. Other regions include Morov, ruled by a mad scientist who turns people into zombies, and Havatoo, a eugenic society with advanced knowledge and strict social classes. Various tribes and kingdoms, like the Samary and Korva, add further complexity, with unique customs and internal conflicts shaping the planet's diverse cultures.

=== Story ===
In the first book Pirates of Venus, Carson Napier, a human from Earth, crash-lands on Venus (Amtor) and is immediately thrust into the chaotic world of warring factions. He encounters the sophisticated Vepajans, who have advanced technology but are under threat from the Thorists, a revolutionary group that overthrows their society, killing or driving out the educated elite. Napier also deals with pirates and dangerous wildlife while learning the complexities of Amtorian politics and culture.

In Lost on Venus, Napier embarks on a journey to rescue Princess Duare, who has been kidnapped by various factions. He encounters a variety of strange creatures and hostile tribes, including the Angans, winged humanoids who serve the Thorists. His travels bring him deeper into the mysteries of Amtor, including its distorted geography and flawed cosmology. In Carson of Venus, the political situation on Venus escalates with the rise of the Zanis, a fascist group inspired by Nazi Germany. Napier becomes embroiled in spy intrigue and war as he navigates the shifting allegiances of various factions. The Zanis' brutal tactics and fascist ideology contrast with the earlier, more chaotic revolutionary forces, marking a shift in the novel's political satire. The book Escape on Venus consists of four interconnected stories, each focusing on different aspects of Venusian life and society. Napier faces various challenges, including being enslaved by fish-men, encountering a fire-worshipping cult, and dealing with the living dead. The stories showcase the diversity of Venus's environments and the ongoing struggles for power among its inhabitants.

The Wizard of Venus is the final entry of the series, where Carson Napier confronts a mad "wizard" on Venus who controls the local population through hypnotic powers. Napier, possessing similar abilities, must outwit the tyrant and free the oppressed people. This novella, written during WWII, features Napier’s use of his own powers in a more direct, confrontational way, and concludes his adventures on the strange and dangerous world of Amtor.
