= The Cave Girl =

Novel by Edgar Rice Burroughs

- Dust jacket from the first edition
- Author: Edgar Rice Burroughs
- Cover artist: J. Allen St. John
- Language: English
- Genre: Fantasy, Lost World
- Publisher: A. C. McClurg
- Publication date: 21 March 1925
- Publication place: United States
- Media type: Print (Hardback)
- Pages: 323

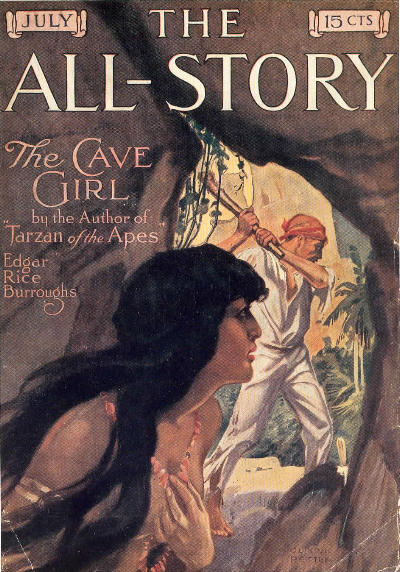
The Cave Girl was serialized in All-Story in 1913

The Cave Girl is a lost world novel by American writer Edgar Rice Burroughs. Originally published in two separate stories, The Cave Girl begun in February 1913 and published by "All-Story" in July, August, and September 1913; and The Cave Man begun in 1914 and published by "All-Story Weekly" throughout March and April 1917. The book version was first published by A. C. McClurg on 1925-03-21. In August 1949, Dell Paperback published a version with a map captioned "Wild Island Home of Nadara the Cave Girl Where Violence and Bloodshed Rule."

== Plot ==
=== Part One ===
Blueblooded mama's boy Waldo Emerson Smith-Jones is swept overboard during a South Seas voyage for his lifelong ill health. He finds himself on a jungle island. His bookish education has not prepared him to cope with these surroundings, and he is a coward. He is terrified when he encounters primitive, violent men, ape-like throwbacks in mankind's evolutionary history. He runs from them, but when he reaches a dead end, he successfully makes a stand, astonishing himself. While keeping the hairy brutes at bay, he meets a beautiful girl, Nadara, also on the run. In an uncharacteristic gesture, he saves her from the grasp of one ape-man during their escape. He is shocked that she believes him a hero, mistaking his frightened screams for war cries. She calls him Thandar, meaning "the brave one". She teaches him the language, how to swim, how to fish, and basic woodcraft, as he begins to realize that he does not know everything. However, Nadara warns him that a newcomer to her tribe must fight the strongest men, who have killed many. When they reach her home village, he is horrified to see that despite her appearance, her tribe seems to be cavemen from the Paleolithic era, not much better than the first tribe. In order to avoid death at the hands of the tribal bullies, he vanishes.

As his jungle adventures continue, he finds that he is growing more healthy due to the constant physical demands of primitive living. Although he wants to go back to see Nadara, he recognizes that he will need more strength before he can make a difference. For six months he trains himself, and also makes some weapons. A modern ship stops at the island, but Waldo surprises himself by deciding to stay until he can ensure Nadara's safety. He gives the crew a letter for his mother and returns to the jungle.

Upon reaching Nadara's tribe's caves, he finds them empty, for they routinely move to new caves. He kills one of her oppressors, but then misses her on the trail. He finds the tribe's new home, and her father charges Waldo to give her a packet of her deceased mother's things. Waldo tracks and finds Nadara, and kills the brutal man chasing her. She is uninterested in the packet, discarding it unopened as she knows her tribal mother had no possessions. Then they spy a ship approaching the island. As he suddenly realizes that he loves her, and how harshly society would treat her, the two of them agree to head for the hills. The ship's search party finds the packet that Nadara carelessly discarded, and discovers that the contents identify a married noble couple from modern society, who disappeared on a voyage less than 20 years previously.

=== Part Two ===
Before they get far, Waldo changes his mind, realizing that his love for Nadara is such that he wants her to have everything he can offer. However, they meet the hostile ape-men on their way to the beach, and when they finally arrive, the ship is gone. They return to Nadara's tribe. On his deathbed, her father explains her mother was actually a woman who arrived in a small boat with a dead man; she died right after giving birth to Nadara. Waldo decides that living with Nadara under primitive moral customs would be wrong, and determines not to take her as his wife until they can return to civilization. He teaches her English in preparation.

Waldo teaches the tribe about rule by consent of the governed, and they choose him as their king. He begins to introduce them to concepts such as agriculture and permanent housing. He has them make spears and shields, and they successfully fight off a raid by the ape-like tribe. However, one ape-man returns that night and kidnaps Nadara. Away from the caves, an earthquake frightens him and he releases her. When she returns to the cliff dwellings, she finds them in ruins. She cannot locate Waldo's cave nor lift the rocks she finds, so she assumes that everyone is dead, and leaves the next day to find a new home.

Back in the States, Waldo's parents decide to send another search mission after they receive his letter. His mother and father both come along. They find Nadara being chased by an ape-man, who they quickly kill. She explains Waldo's death in the earthquake, and Mr. Smith-Jones decides to bring her home. However, his wife is hostile to Nadara. The ship departs, but a storm blows it back towards the islands. When Stark, the first officer, grabs Nadara on the deck late at night, he kidnaps her overboard to a nearby shore. Upon returning to consciousness, she quickly escapes him, but they are captured by a tribe of cannibals. Stark is killed but she is treated considerately.

In the meantime, it seems that Waldo is indeed alive, though he lay unconscious and trapped in his cave a long time. He discovers from a caveman that Nadara left on a ship, and determinedly builds a tiny boat to go after her. After a storm, he is washed ashore on a new island and saves a pirate king from a cannibal. One of the pirates tells of a white goddess at a cannibal temple inland, so Waldo goes to search for Nadara. He rescues her, but they are pursued all the way to the coast. His pirate friends have left, so they are forced to use his little boat again. When they reach land, they are captured by more pirates, who then bring them to a modern boat - his father's ship. It also is being held by the pirates, who are awaiting their leader's return. Waldo's parents initially do not recognize him, but after they do, Waldo's mother reconciles with Nadara. When the pirate king arrives, he recognizes Waldo as his savior and releases the entire group. They sail to Honolulu, and the ship's captain presents Nadara with the found packet as a wedding present, not realizing her connection to it. They discover her noble heritage, and she and Waldo marry.

== Reception ==
Floyd C. Gale of Galaxy Science Fiction in 1963 described The Cave Girl as "a typical Burroughs adventure yarn" and among the rarest of his books before it was reprinted.

== Copyright ==
The copyright for this story has expired in the United States and, thus, now resides in the public domain there.
