= Something of Myself =

Autobiography of Rudyard Kipling

- First edition cover
- Author: Rudyard Kipling
- Original title: Something of Myself: for my friends known and unknown
- Language: English
- Genre: Autobiography
- Published: 1937
- Publisher: Macmillan of London
- Publication place: United Kingdom
- Media type: Print (Hardcover)
- Pages: 237
- LC Class: PR4856 .A5 1937c

Something of Myself: for my friends known and unknown is the autobiography of Rudyard Kipling. Kipling wrote it in the last year of his life; the unfinished text was prepared for publication by his wife. It has remained in print since its first publication in 1937.

== Creation and publication ==
Kipling began work on the autobiography on 1 August 1935, and was last reported to work on it (doing revisions) on 26 December of the same year. He died on 18 January 1936. The unfinished manuscript was edited and prepared for publication by his wife, Caroline Starr Balestier. After preliminary printing of selections from the text in a number of newspapers, the book was published by Macmillan, Kipling's established UK publisher, on 21 December 1937.

Kipling had stated the intention to deal in this account with "his life from the point of view of his work". He thus focuses on describing the inspiration, genesis and workmanship of his literary creations while remaining reticent on most facets of his private life that are not directly connected to his works.
