= Edgar Rice Burroughs =

American writer (1875–1950)

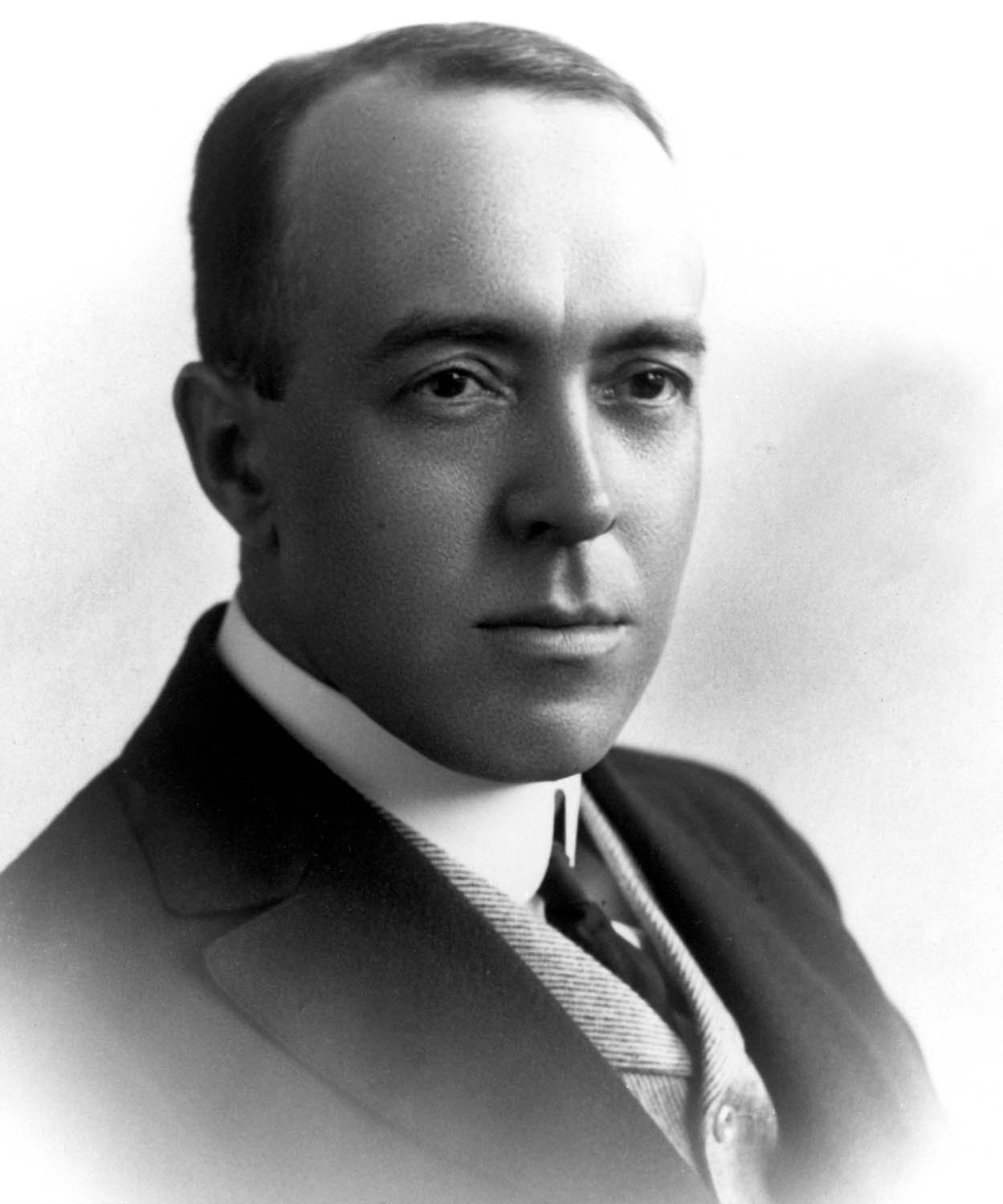
- Born: September 1, 1875; Chicago, Illinois, US
- Died: March 19, 1950 (aged 74); Encino, California, US
- Resting place: Tarzana, California, US
- Occupation: Novelist
- Spouses: Emma Centennia Hulbert (m. 1900; div. 1934); Florence Gilbert (m. 1935; div. 1941)
- Children: 3, including John Coleman Burroughs
- Relatives: James Pierce (son-in-law)
- Military service
- Allegiance: United States
- Branch: United States Army
- Service years: 1894–1897; 1917–1919; 1941–1945
- Rank: Cadet; Trooper; Major; War correspondent
- Units: Michigan Military Academy (1894–95); B Troop, 7th Cavalry (1896–97); 2nd Illinois Reserve Infantry (1917–19)
- Conflicts: Indian Wars; Apache Wars; Fort Grant; First World War; Home Defense; Second World War; Pacific War
- Writing career
- Period: 1911–1950
- Genres: Adventure, fantasy, lost world, sword and planet, planetary romance, soft science fiction, western
- Notable works: Tarzan series; Barsoom series
- Notable awards: Inkpot Award (1975)

Edgar Rice Burroughs (September 1, 1875 – March 19, 1950) was an American writer, recognized for his prolific output in the adventure, science fiction, and fantasy genres. Best known for creating the characters Tarzan (who appeared in a series of twenty-four books by him) and John Carter (who was a recurring character in a series of eleven books), he also wrote the Pellucidar series, the Amtor series, and the Caspak trilogy.

Tarzan was immediately popular, and Burroughs capitalized on it in every possible way, including a syndicated Tarzan comic strip, films, and merchandise. Tarzan remains one of the most successful fictional characters to this day and is a cultural icon. Burroughs's California ranch is now the center of the Tarzana neighborhood in Los Angeles, named after the character. Burroughs was an explicit supporter of eugenics and scientific racism in both his fiction and nonfiction; Tarzan was meant to reflect these concepts.

== Biography ==
=== Early life and family ===
Burroughs was born on September 1, 1875, in Chicago, Illinois, (Note: He later lived for many years in the Chicago suburb Oak Park.) the fourth son of Major George Tyler Burroughs, a businessman and Civil War veteran, and his wife, Mary Evaline (Zieger) Burroughs. Edgar's middle name is from his paternal grandmother, Mary Coleman Rice Burroughs.

Burroughs was of English and Pennsylvania Dutch ancestry, with a family line that had been in North America since the Colonial era. Through his Rice grandmother, Burroughs was descended from settler Edmund Rice, one of the English Puritans who moved to Massachusetts Bay Colony in the early 17th century. He once remarked: "I can trace my ancestry back to Deacon Edmund Rice." The Burroughs side of the family was also of English origin, having emigrated to Massachusetts around the same time. Many of his ancestors fought in the American Revolution. Some of his ancestors settled in Virginia during the colonial period, and Burroughs often emphasized his connection with that side of his family, seeing it as romantic and warlike.

Burroughs was educated at a number of local schools then at Phillips Academy in Andover, Massachusetts, and then the Michigan Military Academy. He graduated in 1895, but he failed the entrance exam for the United States Military Academy at West Point, so instead he enlisted with the 7th U.S. Cavalry in Fort Grant, Arizona Territory. However, he was diagnosed with a heart problem and thus ineligible to serve, so he was discharged in 1897.

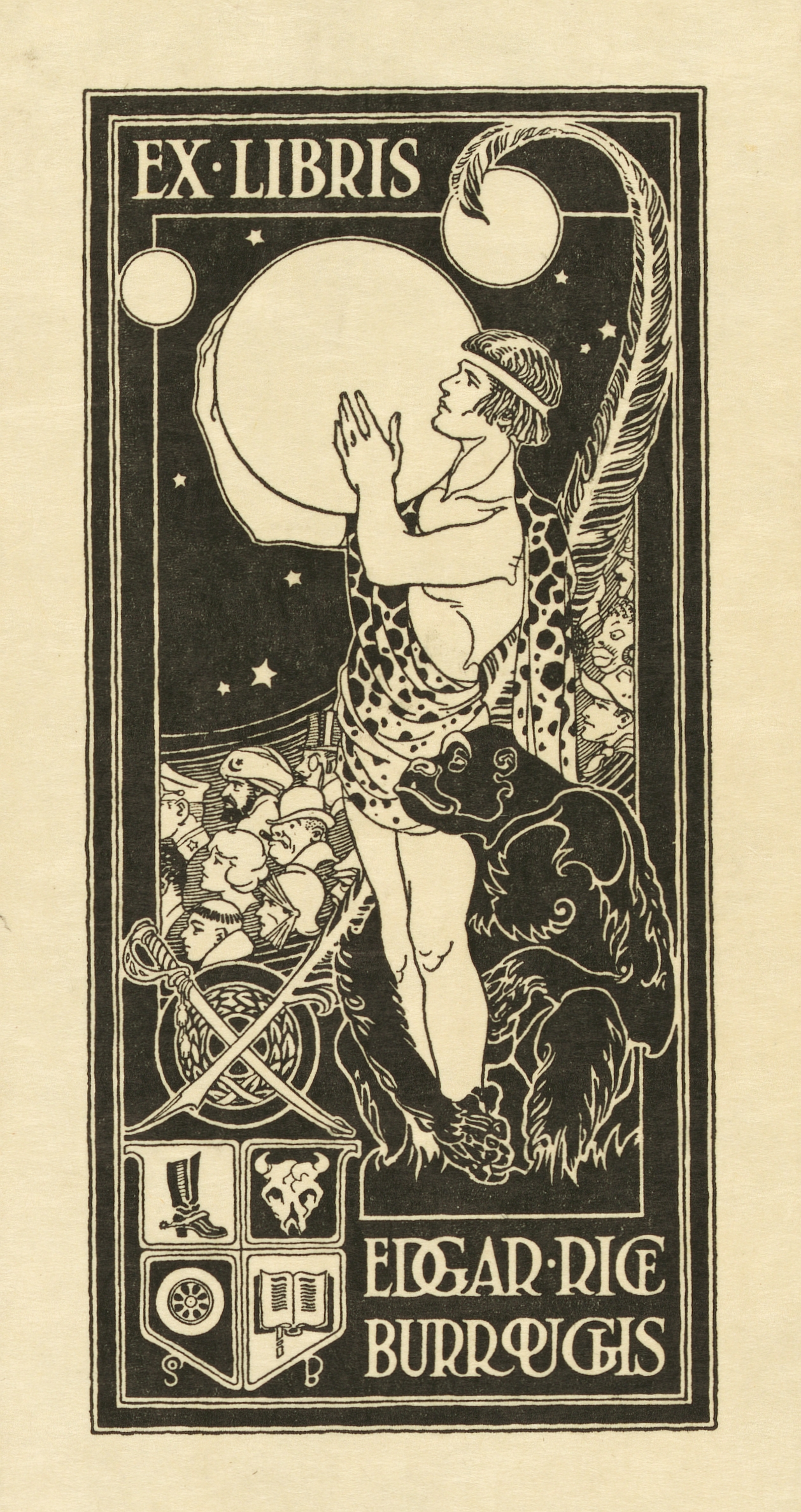
Burroughs's bookplate, showing Tarzan holding the planet Mars, surrounded by other characters from his stories and symbols relating to his personal interests and career

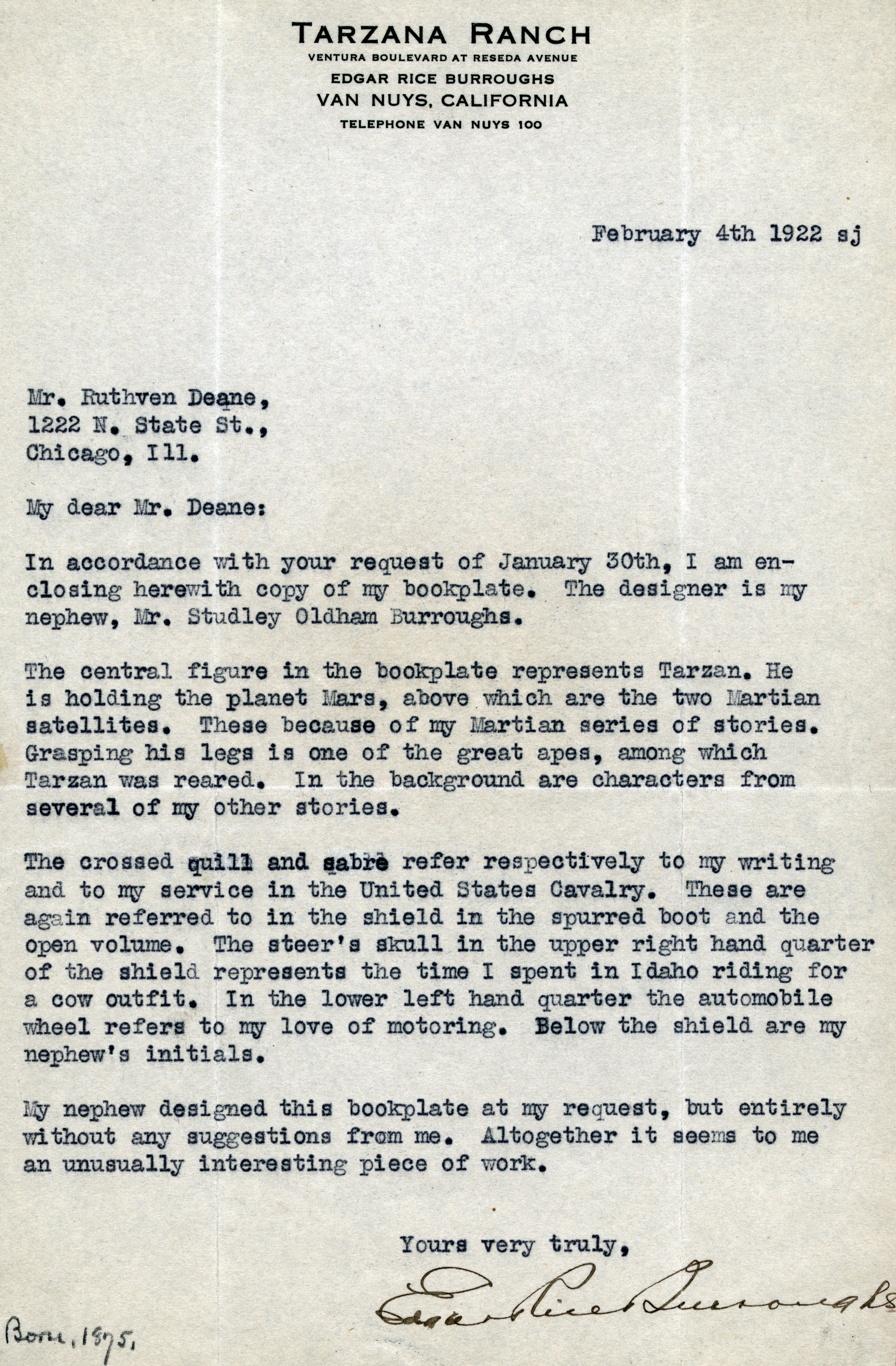
Typescript letter, with Tarzana Ranch letterhead, from Burroughs to Ruthven Deane, explaining the design and significance of his bookplate

After his discharge, Burroughs worked at a number of different jobs. During the Chicago influenza epidemic of 1891, he spent half a year at his brother's ranch on the Raft River in Idaho as a cowboy. He drifted afterward, then worked at his father's Chicago battery factory in 1899. He married his childhood sweetheart, Emma Hulbert (1876–1944), in January 1900.

In 1903, Burroughs joined his brothers, Yale graduates George and Harry, who were by then prominent Pocatello area ranchers in southern Idaho and partners in the Sweetser-Burroughs Mining Company, where he took on managing their ill-fated Snake River gold dredge, a classic bucket-line dredge. The Burroughs brothers were also the sixth cousins once removed of famed miner Kate Rice who in 1914 became the first female prospector in the Canadian North. Journalist and publisher C. Allen Thorndike Rice was also his third cousin.

When the new mine proved unsuccessful, the brothers secured for Burroughs a position with the Oregon Short Line Railroad in Salt Lake City. Burroughs resigned from the railroad in October 1904.

=== Later life ===
By 1911, around age 36, after seven years of low wages as a pencil-sharpener wholesaler, Burroughs began to write fiction. By this time, Emma and he had two children, Joan (1908–1972), and Hulbert (1909–1991). During this period, he had copious spare time and began reading pulp-fiction magazines. In 1929, he recalled thinking that:

"[...] if people were paid for writing rot such as I read in some of those magazines, that I could write stories just as rotten. As a matter of fact, although I had never written a story, I knew absolutely that I could write stories just as entertaining and probably a whole lot more so than any I chanced to read in those magazines."

In 1913, Burroughs and Emma had their third and last child, John Coleman Burroughs (1913–1979), later known for his illustrations of his father's books.

In the 1920s, Burroughs became a pilot, purchased a Security Airster S-1, and encouraged his family to learn to fly.

His daughter Joan married Tarzan film actor James Pierce. She starred with her husband as the voice of Jane during 1932–1934 for the Tarzan radio series.

Burroughs divorced Emma in 1934 and in 1935 married the former actress Florence Gilbert Dearholt, who was the former wife of his friend Ashton Dearholt, with whom he had co-founded Burroughs-Tarzan Enterprises while filming The New Adventures of Tarzan. Burroughs adopted the Dearholts' two children. He and Florence divorced in 1942.

Burroughs was in his late 60s and was in Honolulu at the time of the Japanese attack on Pearl Harbor. Despite his age, he applied for and received permission to become a war correspondent, becoming one of the oldest U.S. war correspondents during World War II. This period of his life is mentioned in William Brinkley's bestselling novel Don't Go Near the Water.

=== Death ===
After the war ended, Burroughs moved back to Encino, California, where after many health problems, he died aged 74, of a heart attack on March 19, 1950, having written almost 80 novels. He is buried in Tarzana, California, US.

At the time of his death he was believed to have been the writer who had made the most from films, earning over US$2 million in royalties from 27 Tarzan pictures.

The Science Fiction Hall of Fame inducted Burroughs in 2003.

== Literary career ==
Aiming his work at the pulps—under the name "Norman Bean" to protect his reputation—Burroughs had his first story, Under the Moons of Mars, serialized by Frank Munsey in the February to July 1912 issues of The All-Story. (Note: A poem by Burroughs was published on October 15, 1910, in the Chicago Tribune as "by Normal Bean", and two more were published in the Tribune in 1914 and 1915. "Norman" was an All-Story typesetter's presumptive correction of "Normal". Burroughs used his own name for his other publications.) Under the Moons of Mars inaugurated the Barsoom series, introduced John Carter, and earned Burroughs US$400 ($11,922 today). It was first published as a book by A. C. McClurg of Chicago in 1917, entitled A Princess of Mars, after three Barsoom sequels had appeared as serials and McClurg had published the first four serial Tarzan novels as books.

Burroughs soon took up writing full-time, and by the time the run of Under the Moons of Mars had finished, he had completed two novels, including Tarzan of the Apes, published from October 1912 and one of his most successful series.

Burroughs also wrote popular science fiction and fantasy stories involving adventurers from Earth transported to various planets (notably Barsoom, Burroughs's fictional name for Mars, and Amtor, his fictional name for Venus), lost islands (Caspak), and into the interior of the Hollow Earth in his Pellucidar stories. He also wrote Westerns and historical romances. Besides those published in All-Story, many of his stories were published in The Argosy magazine.

Tarzan was a cultural sensation when introduced. Burroughs was determined to capitalize on Tarzan's popularity in every way possible. He planned to exploit Tarzan through several different media including a syndicated Tarzan comic strip, movies, and merchandise. Experts in the field advised against this course of action, stating that the different media would just end up competing against each other. Burroughs went ahead, however, and proved the experts wrong – the public wanted Tarzan in whatever fashion he was offered. Tarzan remains one of the most successful fictional characters to this day and is a cultural icon.

In 1919, Burroughs purchased a large ranch north of Los Angeles, California, which he named "Tarzana". The citizens of the community that sprang up around the ranch voted to adopt that name when their community, Tarzana, California, was formed in 1927. Also, the unincorporated community of Tarzan, Texas, was formally named in 1927 when the US Postal Service accepted the name, reputedly coming from the popularity of the first (silent) Tarzan of the Apes film, starring Elmo Lincoln, and an early "Tarzan" comic strip.

In 1923, Burroughs set up his own company, Edgar Rice Burroughs, Inc., and began printing his own books through the 1930s.

== Reception ==
Because of the part Burroughs's science fiction played in inspiring real exploration of Mars, an impact crater on Mars was named in his honor after his death. In a Paris Review interview, Ray Bradbury said of Burroughs:

"Edgar Rice Burroughs never would have looked upon himself as a social mover and shaker with social obligations. But as it turns out – and I love to say it because it upsets everyone terribly – Burroughs is probably the most influential writer in the entire history of the world. By giving romance and adventure to a whole generation of boys, Burroughs caused them to go out and decide to become special."

In Something of Myself (published posthumously in 1937) Rudyard Kipling wrote: "My Jungle Books begat Zoos of [imitators]. But the genius of all the genii was one who wrote a series called Tarzan of the Apes. I read it, but regret I never saw it on the films, where it rages most successfully. He had 'jazzed' the motif of the Jungle Books and, I imagine, had thoroughly enjoyed himself. He was reported to have said that he wanted to find out how bad a book he could write and 'get away with', which is a legitimate ambition."

By 1963, Floyd C. Gale of Galaxy Science Fiction wrote when discussing reprints of several Burroughs novels by Ace Books, "an entire generation has grown up inexplicably Burroughs-less". He stated that most of the author's books had been out of print for years and that only the "occasional laughable Tarzan film" reminded the public of his fiction. Gale reported his surprise that after two decades his books were again available, with Canaveral Press, Dover Publications, and Ballantine Books also reprinting them.

Few critical books have been written about Burroughs. From an academic standpoint, the most helpful are Erling Holtsmark's two books: Tarzan and Tradition and Edgar Rice Burroughs; Stan Galloway's The Teenage Tarzan: A Literary Analysis of Edgar Rice Burroughs' Jungle Tales of Tarzan; and Richard Lupoff's two books: Master of Adventure: Edgar Rice Burroughs and Barsoom: Edgar Rice Burroughs and the Martian Vision. Galloway was identified by James Edwin Gunn as "one of the half-dozen finest Burroughs scholars in the world"; Galloway called Holtsmark his "most important predecessor".

Burroughs strongly supported eugenics and scientific racism. His views held that English nobles made up a particular heritable elite among Anglo-Saxons. Tarzan was meant to reflect this, with him being born to English nobles and then adopted by talking apes (the Mangani). They express eugenicist views themselves, but Tarzan is permitted to live despite being deemed "unfit" in comparison and grows up to surpass not only them but black Africans, whom Burroughs clearly presents as inherently inferior. In one Tarzan story, he finds an ancient civilization where eugenics has been practiced for over 2,000 years, with the result that it is free of all crime. Criminal behavior is held to be entirely hereditary, with the solution having been to kill not only criminals but also their families. Lost on Venus, a later novel, presents a similar utopia where forced sterilization is practiced and the "unfit" are killed. Burroughs explicitly supported such ideas in his unpublished nonfiction essay I See A New Race. Additionally, his Pirate Blood, which is not speculative fiction and remained unpublished after his death, portrayed the characters as victims of their hereditary criminal traits (one a descendant of the corsair Jean Lafitte, another from the Jukes family). These views have been compared with Nazi eugenics (though noting that they were popular and common at the time), with his Lost on Venus being released the same year the Nazis took power (in 1933).

In 2003, Burroughs was inducted into the Science Fiction and Fantasy Hall of Fame.

As of 2025, there exists a significant special collection of Edgar Rice Burroughs' various works at the Oak Park Public Library. Consisting of many rare books of his Tarzan, Mucker, Barsoom, Pellucidar, Venus, Caspak, and Moon series, the collection was developed due to Burroughs' own connection to the city, being where he wrote several of his first works, those being the Tarzan and Martian stories. Beyond the rare editions, the collection also holds a number of newspaper clippings, ephemera, correspondence between Burroughs and others, as well as various old Tarzan films. Much of the initial collection was gathered during a block party held in 1975 by a group called CHEETAH (Citizens Holding Exercises Extolling Tarzan's Anniversary Here) and compiled by Florence Moyer.

== In popular culture ==
Adam Butcher portrays Burroughs (known in the show as "Norman Bean") in episode 3 of season 16 "The Write Stuff" (September 26, 2022) of the Canadian television period detective series Murdoch Mysteries.

== Selected works ==
=== Barsoom series (aka Martian series) ===
1. A Princess of Mars (1912)
2. The Gods of Mars (1913)
3. The Warlord of Mars (1914)
4. Thuvia, Maid of Mars (1916)
5. The Chessmen of Mars (1922)
6. The Master Mind of Mars (1927)
7. A Fighting Man of Mars (1930)
8. Swords of Mars (1936)
9. Synthetic Men of Mars (1939)
10. Llana of Gathol (1941)
11. John Carter of Mars (1964, two stories from 1940 and 1943)

=== Tarzan series ===
1. Tarzan of the Apes (1912)
2. The Return of Tarzan (1913)
3. The Beasts of Tarzan (1914)
4. The Son of Tarzan (1915)
5. Tarzan and the Jewels of Opar (1916)
6. Jungle Tales of Tarzan (stories 1916–1917)
7. Tarzan the Untamed (1919)
8. Tarzan the Terrible (1921)
9. Tarzan and the Golden Lion (1922)
10. Tarzan and the Ant Men (1924)
11. Tarzan, Lord of the Jungle (1927)
12. Tarzan and the Lost Empire (1928)
13. Tarzan at the Earth's Core (1929)
14. Tarzan the Invincible (1930)
15. Tarzan Triumphant (1931)
16. Tarzan and the City of Gold (1932)
17. Tarzan and the Lion Man (1933)
18. Tarzan and the Leopard Men (1932)
19. Tarzan's Quest (1935)
20. Tarzan the Magnificent (1936)
21. Tarzan and the Forbidden City (1938)
22. Tarzan and the Foreign Legion (1947, written in 1944)
23. Tarzan and the Tarzan Twins (1963, collects 1927 and 1936 children's books)
24. Tarzan and the Madman (1964, written in 1940)
25. Tarzan and the Castaways (1965, stories from 1940 to 1941)
26. Tarzan: The Lost Adventure (1995, rewritten version of 1946 fragment, completed by Joe R. Lansdale)

=== Pellucidar series ===
1. At the Earth's Core (1914)
2. Pellucidar (1915)
3. Tanar of Pellucidar (1929)
4. Tarzan at the Earth's Core (1929)
5. Back to the Stone Age (1937)
6. Land of Terror (1944, written in 1939)
7. Savage Pellucidar (1963, stories from 1942)

=== Venus series ===
1. Pirates of Venus (1932)
2. Lost on Venus (1933)
3. Carson of Venus (1938)
4. Escape on Venus (1946, stories from 1941 to 1942)
5. The Wizard of Venus (1970, written in 1941)

=== Caspak series ===
1. The Land That Time Forgot (1918)
2. The People That Time Forgot (1918)
3. Out of Time's Abyss (1918)

=== Moon series ===
- Part I: The Moon Maid (1923, serialized in Argosy, May 5 – June 2, 1923)
- Part II: The Moon Men (1925, serialized in Argosy, February 21 – March 14, 1925)
- Part III: The Red Hawk (1925 serialized in Argosy, September 5–19, 1925)

These three texts have been published by various houses in one or two volumes. Adding to the confusion, some editions have the original (significantly longer) introduction to Part I from the first publication as a magazine serial, and others have the shorter version from the first book publication, which included all three parts under the title The Moon Maid.

=== Mucker series ===
- The Mucker (1914)
- The Return of the Mucker (1916)
- The Oakdale Affair (1918)

=== Other science fiction ===
- The Monster Men (1913)
- The Lost Continent (1916; a.k.a. Beyond Thirty)
- The Resurrection of Jimber-Jaw (1937)
- Beyond the Farthest Star (1942)

=== Jungle adventure novels ===
- The Cave Girl (1913, revised 1917)
- The Eternal Lover (1914, rev. 1915; A.K.A. The Eternal Savage)
- The Man-Eater (1915)
- The Lad and the Lion (1917)
- Jungle Girl (1931; A.K.A. The Land of Hidden Men)

=== Western novels ===
- The Bandit of Hell's Bend (1924)
- The War Chief (1927)
- Apache Devil (1933)
- The Deputy Sheriff of Comanche County (1940)

=== Historical novels ===
- The Outlaw of Torn (1914)
- I am a Barbarian (1967; written in 1941)

=== Other works ===
- Minidoka: 937th Earl of One Mile Series M (1998; written in 1903)
- The Mad King (1914, rev. 1915)
- The Girl from Farris's (1916) The full text of The Girl from Farris's at Wikisource
- The Rider (1918)
- The Efficiency Expert (1921)
- The Girl from Hollywood (1922)
- Marcia of the Doorstep (1924)
- You Lucky Girl! (1927)
- Pirate Blood (1970; written in 1932)
- Forgotten Tales of Love and Murder (2001; stories from 1910 to 1944)
- Brother Men (2005; nonfiction)

== See also ==
- Edgar Rice Burroughs, Inc.
- Mars in fiction
- Otis Adelbert Kline
- Sword and planet
