= The Efficiency Expert (novel) =

Novella by Edgar Rice Burroughs

- Cover of first book edition, 1966
- Author: Edgar Rice Burroughs
- Cover artist: Frank Frazetta
- Language: English
- Genre: Novel
- Publisher: House of Greystoke
- Publication date: 1966 (original magazine publication 1921)
- Publication place: United States
- Media type: Print (hardcover)
- Pages: 84
- OCLC: N/A
- Dewey Decimal: N/A
- LC Class: N/A

The Efficiency Expert is a 1921 novella by American writer Edgar Rice Burroughs. One of a small number of Burroughs' novels set in contemporary America as opposed to a fantasy universe, The Efficiency Expert follows the adventures of Jimmy Torrance as he attempts to make a career for himself in 1921 Chicago. The book is remarkable for the criminal livelihoods of the hero's friends. It was also admitted to be a fictionalization of Burroughs' own difficulties in finding a job prior to becoming a best-selling writer. Though written in 1919, it was first published in the October 1921 edition of the All-Story Weekly magazine. The first book publication was by House of Greystoke in 1966.

== Plot summary ==
Jimmy Torrance, football player, boxer, socialite, athlete and all-around Big Man On Campus, is nearly kicked out of university, but upon pleading for a second chance, he is granted one and successfully graduates. Spurning an offer from his father to come work for the family business, he determines to make something of himself first, and repairs to Chicago. However, nothing comes of his many attempts to find work, and he despairs. Friendship with a pickpocket known as "The Lizard" cheers him up and he reapplies himself, finally finding work in a department store. He also makes the acquaintance of a young lady of quality, one Elizabeth Compton. Torrance gains (and loses) a number of jobs in rapid succession, including ladies' hosiery clerk, waiter, boxer, and milkman, chancing to meet Elizabeth and her friend Harriet Holden in most of these occupations. During his stint as a waiter, he also wins the friendship of a prostitute with a heart of gold named Edith (Little Eva).

Elizabeth's father runs a factory and is worried that he is losing money. He advertises for an "efficiency expert" to come help him turn things around. Edith sees the ad and encourages Torrance to apply, writing him fraudulent letters of recommendation to assist him. Torrance does indeed get the job, where he immediately begins to improve things while simultaneously beginning to suspect that someone at the factory is stealing. Elizabeth's fiancé Harold Bince, the factory's assistant manager – who is himself the embezzler in question, due to large gambling debts – tries to get Torrance fired, an effort in which Elizabeth herself eagerly assists.

Torrance figures out the truth and has Mr. Compton engage an outside firm of accountants to prove his case, not wanting to deliver the bad news himself. In desperation, Bince tries to get rid of Torrance, leading up to a violent climax in which Elizabeth's father is murdered and Torrance is framed. The Lizard and Little Eva work to get him off, an effort that finally succeeds when The Lizard takes the stand and proves Torrance could not have committed the murder. Bince, who has persuaded Elizabeth to marry him, is exposed and commits suicide. A sadder and wiser Elizabeth asks Torrance to take over as manager of the factory.
