= Clash by Night (short story) =

- Short story by Lawrence O'Donnell
- Country: United States
- Language: English
- Genre: Science fiction

Publication
- Published in: Astounding Science Fiction Magazine
- Publication type: Magazine
- Publisher: Astounding Science Fiction Magazine
- Media type: Print (Periodical)
- Publication date: March 1943

"Clash by Night" is a military science fiction short story by Henry Kuttner and C. L. Moore, writing under the pen-name Lawrence O'Donnell. It was originally published in the March 1943 issue of Astounding Science Fiction Magazine.

== Plot ==
The story is a naval romance set on a version of the planet Venus that is largely covered by water. Cities are built in underwater domes known as "Keeps", while warfare is prosecuted under strict rules by surface ships and submarines crewed by mercenaries known as Free Companies. The surface of Venus is uninhabitable due to the Sun's ultra-violet radiation, which leaves the mercenaries with dark skin tans compared to the pale Keep dwellers. The introduction to the story casts it as an ancient legend from the early colonization of Venus.

Captain Brian Scott is a member of Doone's Free Companions, allied with Montana Keep. They are mobilized to counter an attack by Virginia Keep. Like all such, the object is to extract a war indemnity payable in "korium", an energy source. Scott, who is second in command to Commander-in-Chief "Cinc" Rhys, must muster his men and ships while dealing with the possibility of ending his career and living in a Keep, tempted by the hedonistic lifestyle, personified by a woman, Ilene Kane. His dedication is further tested when, returning from negotiations with Mendez, commander of an allied Free Company, his boat wrecks and he must trek through the deadly Venusian jungle with a raw recruit who happens to be Ilene's brother, Norman.

The battle hinges on the Doone's massive "monitor", the Armageddon, which has enough firepower to destroy an entire fleet, but is too slow to be effective in quick engagements. Monitors also have a tendency to capsize, which leads the Doone Company to mount a deception by covering the superstructure with a fake keel. Rhys is killed in the initial exchanges of fire, putting Scott in command. His ship is then hit, leaving him at the mercy of Mendez and Bienne, a jealous subordinate. Either could kill him and take command. Instead, they save him and transfer to another ship. The enemy then approaches too close to the Armageddon and is defeated when the deception is revealed.

Scott, while disillusioned by the senseless conflict, rejects the temptations of Keep life for the idealism that will one day conquer the surface of the planet and render the Keeps obsolete.
