= Edgar Rice Burroughs, Inc. =

American holding company

- Founded: 1923; 103 years ago
- Founder: Edgar Rice Burroughs
- Headquarters: Tarzana, California

Edgar Rice Burroughs, Inc. is an American holding company founded in 1923 by author Edgar Rice Burroughs. It is based in Tarzana, California. The company holds the rights to the literary estate of Burroughs that are still protected by copyright (a number of Burroughs' early works have passed out of copyright and consequently are in the public domain).

Burroughs was one of the first artists to incorporate, which he did for tax reasons and for more control over his works. Burroughs' books were published through the company from 1931 (Tarzan the Invincible) through 1948 (Llana of Gathol), with one additional title (I Am a Barbarian) appearing in 1967.

The company remains in the ownership of the Burroughs family and manages and licenses Burroughs' works and characters, including Tarzan and John Carter of Mars. In most of the world, the original work of Burroughs is now in the public domain.

== Legal actions ==
Edgar Rice Burroughs, Inc. has been involved in numerous legal actions over the years, even in cases where copyright on Burroughs' original work had expired.

The company successfully sued Gold Star Books in 1966 and forced the Tarzan series of books by Barton Werper to be taken off the market.

In 2004, the company threatened Victoria University Press with a lawsuit over author Nigel Cox's book Tarzan Presley, which blended the Tarzan mythos with the life of Elvis Presley. The book has not been reprinted since its initial publication.

In 2012, the company sued Dynamite Comics for trademark infringement. Dynamite's series Lord of the Jungle and Warlord of Mars were based on Burroughs' novels that had entered public domain. However, ERB claimed that use of trademarked characters Tarzan and John Carter constituted infringement and unfair competition. Dynamite and ERB settled the claim in 2014, and signed a contract to clear the way for both series to continue.

== Authorized editions ==
Starting in 2020, ERB, Inc. will be re-printing the complete literary works of Burroughs, accompanied by new artwork created by Joe Jusko, in hardcover format.
