= Project Gutenberg Australia =

Online digital book library

- Website type: Digital library
- Available in: English
- Website: gutenberg.net.au
- Commercial: No
- Launched: 2001
- Current status: Online

Project Gutenberg Australia, abbreviated as PGA, is an Internet site which was founded in 2001 by Colin Choat. It is a sister site of Project Gutenberg, though there is no formal relationship between the two organizations. The site hosts free ebooks or e-texts which are in the public domain in Australia. Volunteers have prepared and submitted the ebooks.

To complement the extensive amount of original source material available in the form of ebooks, a great deal of information about the history and the exploration of Australia is provided, together with a "Library of Australiana", a list of ebooks available about Australia or written by Australians.

Because of differences between Australian and United States (where Project Gutenberg is based) copyright law, Project Gutenberg Australia contains many works not available in Project Gutenberg, including works by Margaret Mitchell, George Orwell, Ayn Rand, H. P. Lovecraft, Edgar Wallace, S. S. Van Dine and Dylan Thomas.

With the introduction of the U.S.-Australia Free Trade Agreement, works of authors who died after 31 December 1954 will now not enter the public domain in Australia until at least 1 January 2026. However, all such works which were already public domain under Australian law as of the end of 2004 remain in the public domain, and thus continue to be hosted at Project Gutenberg of Australia.

== See also ==
- Copyright law of Australia
- Project Gutenberg
- Project Gutenberg Canada
- Open access in Australia
