= Robert K. Abbett =

American artist and illustrator

Robert Kennedy Abbett (January 5, 1926 – June 20, 2015) was an American artist and illustrator. He was best known for his illustration of Tarzan comic books in the 60s and 70s.

== Biography ==
Abbett was born in 1926 in Hammond, Indiana.

During the late-1950s, 1960s and 1970s, Abbett illustrated book covers for war novels, detective novels, thrillers, historical fiction and science fiction. Today, Abbett is best known for his paintings of wildlife (in particular, dogs), wilderness, sporting, and fishing.

His illustrations have been featured in a large number of books, magazines, and advertising. He has also authored or been featured in several art-related books, including A Season for Painting: The Outdoor Paintings of Robert K. Abbett and Wings from Cover: The Upland Images of Robert Abbett and Ed Gray.

Abbett was a graduate of both the University of Missouri and Purdue University. In 1953, Abbett moved to rural Connecticut where he built a house on an old farm (namely, Oakdale Farm). There, Abbett was inspired by the untouched wilderness and forests, and began painting what he has become famous for today: animals and country life.

He died on June 20, 2015, at the age of 89 at his home in Bridgewater, Connecticut.

== Book covers illustrations ==
Robert K. Abbett was an illustrator for Ballantine Books, Pyramid Books and Ace Books, as well as gold medal, Avon, Permabook, and Pocket Books. He illustrated Edgar Rice Burroughs' books, including the Tarzan series, Barsoom series, and Pellucidar series.

=== Books ===
- The Quiet American by Graham Greene, Bantam Books, 1957
- The Devil to Pay by Ellery Queen (pseudonym), Pocket Books, 1958
- Spearhead by Franklin M. Davis, Jr., Permabooks, 1958
- Justice, My Brother by James Keene (pseudonym of William Everett Cook), Dell Books, 1959
- The D.A. Cooks a Goose by Erle Stanley Gardner, Pocket Books, 1959
- Turn on the Heat by A.A. Fair, Dell Books 1959
- Colonel Hugh North Solves The MULTI-MILLION-DOLLAR MURDERS, by F. Van Wyck Mason, Cardinal Edition, 1960
- Fear is the Key by Alistair MacLean, Permabook, 1960
- Kiss Off the Dead by Garrity, Gold Medal, 1960
- Mark Kilby and the Miami Mob by Robert Caine Frazer, Pocket Books, 1960
- Plot It Yourself by Rex Stout, Bantam Books, 1960
- The Fix by Jack Usher, Pocket Books, Inc., 1961
- The Grave's in the Medal by Manning Lee Stokes, Dell 1961
- The Counterfeit Courier by James C. Sheers, Dell Books, 1961
- Born of Battle by Robert Crane, Pyramid Books, 1962
- Cry, Baby by Jack Ehrlich, Dell 1962
- The Girl From Midnight by Robert Wade and Bill Miller, Gold Medal Books, 1962
- Cleopatra, by Jeffry K. Gardner, 1962
- Earth Abides, by George R. Stewart, Ace Books 1962
- The Hate Merchant by Niven Busch, Macfadden Books, 1962
- Tobruk by Peter Rabe, Bantam Books
- Acapulco G.P.O. by Day Keene, Dell Books
- The Life and Good Times of Randolf Hearst, by John Tebbel, Paperback Library, Inc., 1962
- The Case Against Satan by Ray Russell, Paperback Library, Inc., 1963
- The Bowl of Brass by Paul Wellman, Paperback Library, Inc.
- Assignment—Stella Marni (Sam Durell Series) by Edward S. Aarons, Gold Medal Book, 1965
- Bats Fly at Dusk by A. A. Fair, Dell, 1966
- Bedrooms Have Windows by A. A. Fair, Dell, 1966
- Some Women Won't Wait by A. A. Fair, Dell, 1966
- A Woman of the People by Benjamin Capps, Duell, Sloan & Pearce, 1966
- Chicago 11 by Day Keen, Dell, 1966
- The Dark Fantastic by Whit Masterson (pseudonym of Robert Wade and H. Bill Miller), Avon Books, 1966
- In the Last Analysis by Amanda Cross (pseudonym of Carolyn G. Heilbrun), 1966 (ISBN 0380545101)
- The Bull Whip Breed by J. T. Edson, Bantam Books, 1969

=== Tarzan ===
- Tarzan of the Apes, Ballantine 1969
- The Return of Tarzan, Ballantine, 1969
- The Beasts of Tarzan, Ballantine 1969
- The Son of Tarzan, Ballantine 1969
- Tarzan and the Jewels of Opar, Ballantine 1969
- Jungle Tales of Tarzan, Ballantine 1969
- Tarzan the Untamed, Ballantine 1969
- Tarzan the Terrible, Ballantine 1969
- Tarzan and the Golden Lion, Ballantine 1969
- Tarzan and the Ant Men, Ballantine 1969
- Tarzan and the Lost Empire, Ballantine 1969
- Tarzan at the Earth's Core, Ballantine 1970
- Tarzan the Invincible, Ballantine 1970
- Tarzan Triumphant, Ballantine 1970
- Tarzan and the City of Gold, Ballantine 1970
- Tarzan and the Lion Man, Ballantine 1970
- Tarzan and the Leopard Men, Ballantine 1970
- Tarzan's Quest, Ballantine 1974
- Tarzan and the Foreign Legion, Ballantine, 1964
- Tarzan and the Madman, Ballantine 1965
- Tarzan and the Castaways, Ballantine, 1965

=== Barsoom (Mars) ===
Front cover of the 1963 Ballantine Books paperback edition of Chessmen of Mars by Edgar Rice Burroughs. Cover illustration by Robert Abbett.

- A Princess of Mars, Ballantine 1963
- The Gods of Mars, Ballantine 1963
- The Warlord of Mars, Ballantine 1963
- Thuvia, Maid of Mars, Ballantine 1963, 1969 (new painting)
- The Chessmen of Mars, Ballantine 1963
- The Master Mind of Mars, Ballantine 1963
- A Fighting Man of Mars, Ballantine 1963
- Swords of Mars, Ballantine 1963
- Synthetic Men of Mars, Ballantine 1963
- Llana of Gathol, Ballantine 1963
- John Carter of Mars, Ballantine 1965

=== Pellucidar ===
- Tarzan at the Earth's Core, Ballantine 1974
