= Amazing Stories Annual =

Science fiction magazine

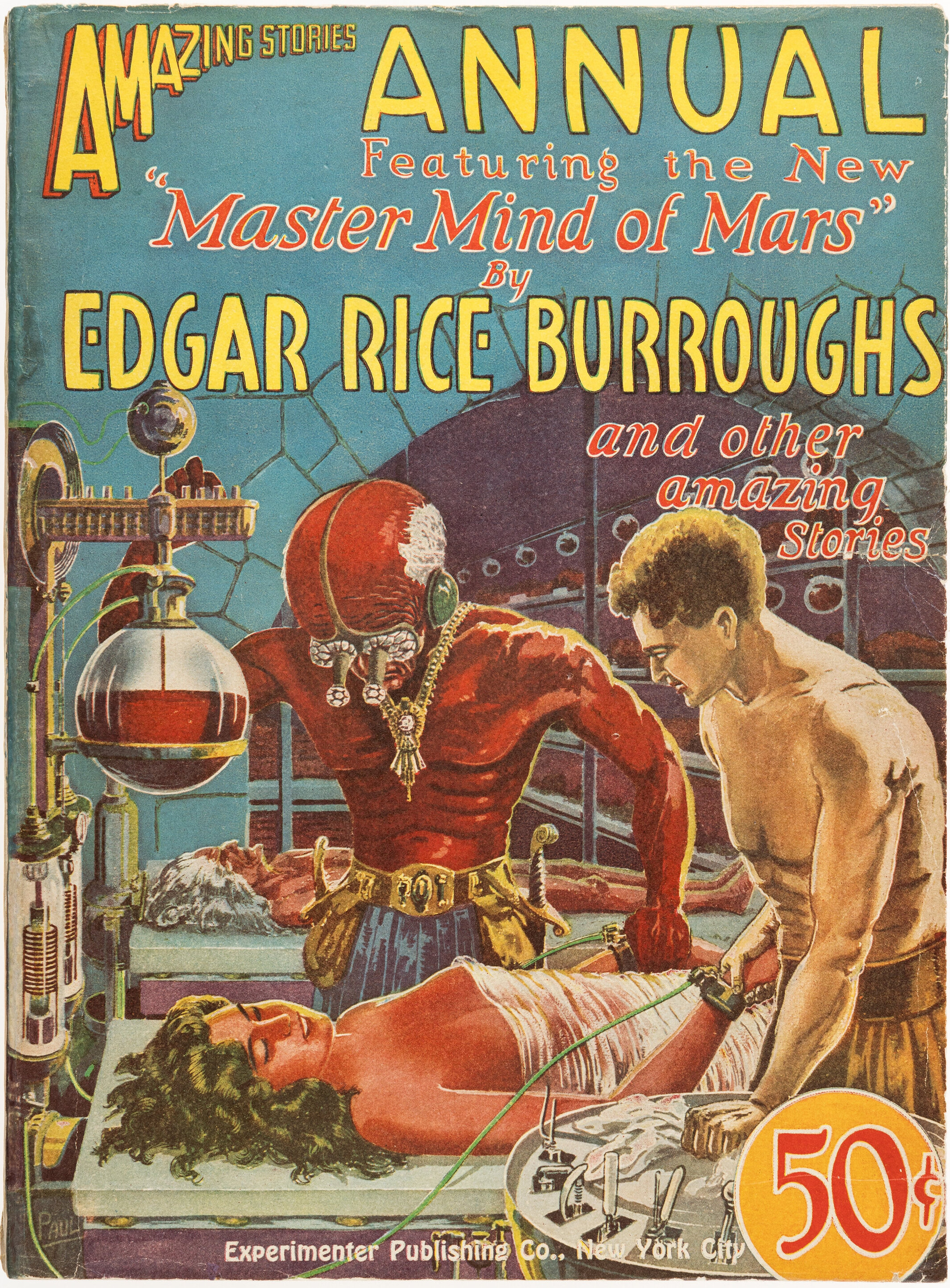
Cover of the only issue. The artwork is by Frank R. Paul.

Amazing Stories Annual was a pulp magazine which published a single issue in July 1927. It was edited by Hugo Gernsback, and featured the first publication of The Master Mind of Mars, by Edgar Rice Burroughs, which had been rejected by several other magazines, perhaps because the plot included a satire on religious fundamentalism. The other stories in Amazing Stories Annual were reprints, including two stories by A. Merritt, and one by H.G. Wells. The magazine sold out, and its success led Gernsback to launch Amazing Stories Quarterly the following year.

== Publication history and contents ==
In 1926, Hugo Gernsback launched Amazing Stories, the first magazine to publish only science fiction. The magazine was an immediate success, and in order to take advantage of its popularity Gernsback considered either increasing the frequency of Amazing Stories to twice a month, or taking the year's most popular stories from the magazine, and publishing them in an annual reprint edition. In early April 1927, Gernsback asked Edgar Rice Burroughs if he had anything to submit. Burroughs had completed Vad Varo of Barsoom, a novel in his Barsoom series; but had sent it to Munsey's Argosy, Street and Smith's Popular Magazine, and Elks Magazine without success. One of the rejection letters described aspects of the story as "repellent"; science fiction historian Mike Ashley suggests that this was probably in reference to the human organ transplant plot elements in the book. Another science fiction historian, Everett Bleiler, gives an additional possible reason: the book's satire of religious fundamentalists might have made the book unattractive to the usual pulp editors. Even when Burroughs offered it to Street and Smith's Popular Magazine with the proviso that he would only be paid if the magazine's circulation went up, it was rejected. Bleiler speculates that Gernsback knew his readership was less likely to be sympathetic to religious fundamentalism, or that he was liberal enough to enjoy Burroughs' criticisms of religion; whatever the reason, he agreed to purchase the novel early in May. As a result of the repeated rejections Burroughs only asked for two cents per word from Gernsback, instead of the six cents he was used to getting for his work; even this was conditional on the success of Gernsback's magazine. Gernsback was notorious for slow payment and non-payment, and Burroughs had some difficulty extracting the $1,250 Gernsback owed him. Gernsback eventually paid him with trade acceptances (a form of commercial IOU), but Burroughs added seven per cent interest to the original fee, for a total of $1,266.01.

In his correspondence with Burroughs, Gernsback had specified that he would like something with more scientific content than was usual in Burroughs' work. Science fiction historian Milton Wolf quotes Gernsback's assertion that the science in the story was "excellent", and also quotes author Frederik Pohl's reminiscences: "It was even scientifically accurate. That, I admit, is a claim for Burroughs not often heard...Barsoom is not much like the Mars of the Mariner photographs. But it is very like the Mars of Percival Lowell, and that was all that science knew of Mars at the time".

The title of the novel changed several times. In manuscript, Burroughs had called it A Weird Adventure on Mars, but sent it out under the title Vad Varo of Barsoom. Burroughs allowed Gernsback to choose the title for its appearance in Amazing Stories Annual; Gernsback initially suggested Xaxa of Mars, but finally chose The Master Mind of Mars, which remained the book's title in its subsequent editions. The remainder of the magazine was made up of reprints. Five were from Amazing Stories, though in all but one case their first appearances had been elsewhere—for example, H.G. Wells' "Under the Knife", which was included in the Annual, had originally appeared in 1896 in the British magazine The New Review. There were two stories by A. Merritt, as with Burroughs a very popular writer: "The People of the Pit", and "The Face in the Abyss"; the latter was the only story not to be reprinted from Amazing Stories, having been printed in 1923 in Argosy Allstory Weekly. The other stories were "The Feline Light and Power Company Is Organized" by Jacque Morgan, "The Man Who Saved the Earth" by Austin Hall, and "The Man Who Could Vanish" by A. Hyatt Verrill. Gernsback had also intended to reprint Murray Leinster's "The Runaway Skyscraper"; it was not included, so Leinster may have refused because he knew of Gernsback's poor payment habits. The cover art, and most of the interior illustrations, were by Frank R. Paul.

The print run sold out; Bleiler quotes a figure of 150,000 copies, but Wolf says it was 100,000. Gernsback had asked the readers of the Annual to send him feedback, and the response was enthusiastic, with almost every letter asking for Amazing Stories to be switched to a fortnightly basis. In the event Gernsback decided instead to launch Amazing Stories Quarterly, with the first issue appearing the following year.

== Bibliographic details ==
There was a single issue, published by Gernsback's Experimenter Publishing Company of New York, in large pulp format. It was 128 pages, and priced at 50 cents. The editor was Hugo Gernsback. The magazine was at one time considered to be extremely rare, with only about two dozen copies thought to exist, but the appearance of multiple copies for sale on eBay has made it apparent that it is not as rare as was once thought.

== Sources ==
- Ashley, Mike (2004). "The Gernsback Days". In Ashley, Mike; Lowndes, Robert A.W. (eds.). The Gernsback Days: A Study of the Evolution of Modern Science Fiction From 1911 to 1936. Holicong, Pennsylvania: Wildside Press. pp. 16–254. ISBN 0-8095-1055-3.
- Bleiler, Everett F. (1998). Science-Fiction: The Gernsback Years. Kent, Ohio: Kent State University Press. ISBN 0-87338-604-3.
- del Rey, Lester (1979). The World of Science Fiction: The History of a Subculture. New York: Del Rey. ISBN 0-345-25452-X.
- Hulse, Ed (2013). The Blood'n'Thunder Guide to Pulp Fiction. Morris Plains, New Jersey: Murania Press. ISBN 978-1491010938.
- Porges, Irwin (1976) [1975]. Edgar Rice Burroughs: The Man Who Created Tarzan Volume II. New York: Ballantine Books. ISBN 0-345-25131-8.
- Tuck, Donald H. (1982). The Encyclopedia of Science Fiction and Fantasy Volume 3: Miscellaneous. Chicago: Advent: Publishers, Inc. ISBN 0-911682-26-0.
- Wolf, Milton (1985). "Amazing Stories Annual". In Tymn, Marshall B.; Ashley, Mike (eds.). Science Fiction, Fantasy, and Weird Fiction Magazines. Westport, Connecticut: Greenwood Press. pp. 49–51. ISBN 0-313-21221-X.
- Wolf, Milton; Ashley, Mike (1985). "Amazing Stories Quarterly". In Tymn, Marshall B.; Ashley, Mike (eds.). Science Fiction, Fantasy, and Weird Fiction Magazines. Westport, Connecticut: Greenwood Press. pp. 51–57. ISBN 0-313-21221-X.
