= Ras Thavas =

- Barsoom character
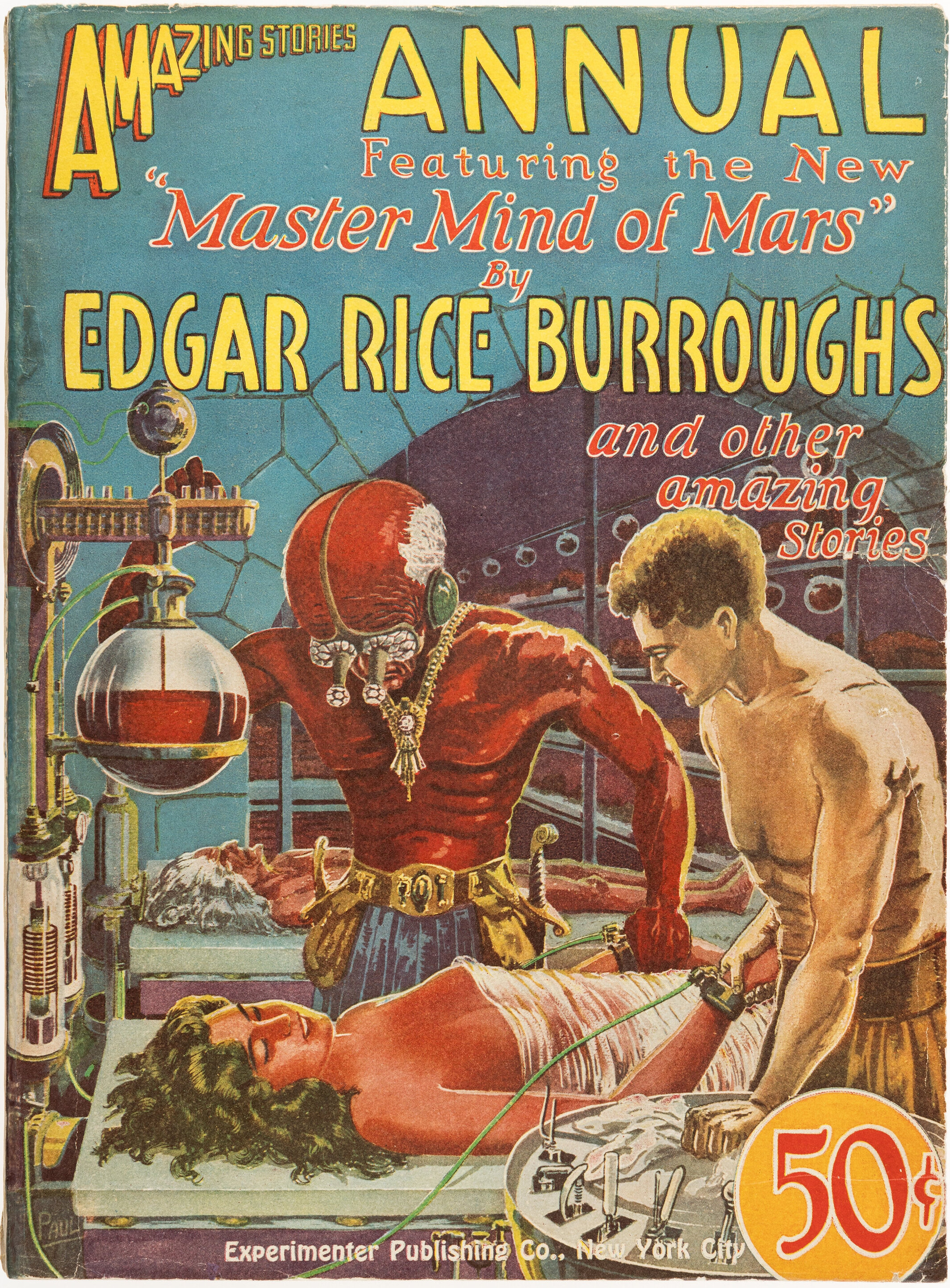
- Cover of Amazing Stories Annual (1927), showing Ras Thavas, Valla Dia and Ulysses Paxton
- First appearance: The Master Mind of Mars
- Created by: Edgar Rice Burroughs

In-universe information
- Gender: Male
- Nationality: Martian

Ras Thavas is a fictional character created by Edgar Rice Burroughs in his 1927 novel The Master Mind of Mars. Within the narrative framework of the story he is an elderly Martian mad scientist of the city-state of Toonol, the "Master Mind" of the novel's title, skilled in the surgical transplantation of brains. He takes in protagonist Ulysses Paxton, an earthman newly arrived on the planet, and educates him in the ways of Barsoom, as Mars is known to its inhabitants.

Ras has perfected techniques of brain transplantation, which he uses to provide rich elderly Martians with youthful new bodies for a profit. Distrustful of his fellow Martians, he trains Paxton as his assistant to perform the same operation on him. But Paxton has fallen in love with Valla Dia, one of Ras' young victims, whose body has been swapped for that of the hag Xaxa, Jeddara (empress) of the city-state of Phundahl. He refuses to operate on Ras until his mentor promises to restore her to her rightful body. Ras agrees, and receives his operation. Now distrustful of his protege, the scientist plots to murder him, but Paxton escapes in the company of other experimental victims of the master mind and proceeds to Phundahl on his quest to retrieve Valla Dia's original body. Ras warns Xaxa against Paxton, but the group ultimately succeeds in kidnapping the Jeddara and reversing the brain exchange. Later Ras travels to Phundahl for aid in recovering his island laboratory, from which he has been expelled by soldiers from Toonol. He finds Xaxa overthrown and Paxton's ally Dar Tarus the new Jeddak. Tarus agrees to oust the Toonolians on the condition that Ras reform and cease trafficking in bodies.

== Further appearances ==
Ras later resurfaces in the later novel Synthetic Men of Mars (1939), by which time he has transferred his base to the dead city of Morbus in the Toonolian Marshes. There he has been experimenting in growing monstrous synthetic human beings called hormads. The most intelligent of these turn on him and force him to grow an army of hormads with which to conquer Barsoom. They also force their captive to transplant their brains into the bodies of imprisoned normal Martians. Ras's chance to turn the tables comes when the earthman John Carter, Warlord of Mars and prince of Helium, seeks his surgical aid for his wife Dejah Thoris, injured in an accident. Imprisoned with Ras, Carter and his companion Vor Daj plot with him against the hormads. Vor Daj is given the body of a hormad to spy on their captors; meanwhile, Carter and Ras escape, returning with a great fleet of airships from Helium. Vor Daj is recovered and Morbus, which has been overrun by a huge mass of cancerously growing hormad flesh, is destroyed with incendiary bombs. Ras then restores Vor Daj to his original body.

One hormad, Ras's pupil Pew Mogel, is later revealed in "John Carter and the Giant of Mars" (1940) to have escaped from Morbus and established a new base in the dead city of Korvas, from which he continues to plot world conquest using the scientific skills he gleaned from his mentor. His scheme is defeated by John Carter.

Ras Thavas also appears in L. Sprague de Camp's Harold Shea story "Sir Harold of Zodanga" (1995), in which he agrees to guide the world-hopping Harold Shea and his wife Belphebe on their quest to recover their kidnapped daughter Voglinda. As payment he seeks professional help from psychologist Shea; since Paxton transplanted his brain from his original aged body into his present young and virile one, he has had difficulty adjusting to changed societal expectations, not to mention the youthful urges of his new form. Over the course of their Barsoomian journey Shea counsels the irascible genius successfully. In turn, Ras helps Shea win a duel with an assassin by employing his superior mental powers to make the hired killer believe he is confronting six Harolds rather than one. He also uses his medical skills to save the life of their enemy Malambroso, who has been wounded by Belphebe.
