= Abbett =

Abbett is a surname. Notable people with the surname include:

- Leon Abbett (1836–1894), American politician and Governor of New Jersey
- Robert K. Abbett (1926–2015), American artist

== See also ==
- Lord Abbett, an American investment management company
