= Paul Frommer =

American linguist

Paul R. Frommer
- Born: 17 September 1944 (age 81); New York City, New York, United States
- Education: Doctorate in linguistics, 1981, University of Southern California
- Occupation: Communications professor at University of Southern California
- Known for: Constructed languages

Paul R. Frommer (/ˈfroʊmər/ FROH-mər; born September 17, 1944) is an American communications professor at the University of Southern California (USC) and a linguistics consultant. He is the former Vice President, Special Projects Coordinator, Strategic Planner, and Writer-Researcher at Bentley Industries in Los Angeles, California. From 2005 to 2008, he served as Director of the Center for Management Communication at the USC Marshall School of Business.

== Youth and education ==
Frommer was born in New York City. Interested in astronomy from an early age, he changed his college major from astrophysics to math, graduating from the University of Rochester with a bachelor of arts in mathematics in 1965. He soon taught English and math in Malaysia in the Malay language with the Peace Corps. He had studied languages earlier, but this experience switched his focus to linguistics. He began a doctoral program in linguistics at the University of Southern California (USC). During the program, he taught English in Iran for a year in the mid-1970s and studied Persian. He earned his master's degree and doctorate in linguistics at USC in 1981 under Bernard Comrie; his doctorate was on aspects of Persian syntax and entitled "Post-verbal Phenomena in Colloquial Persian Syntax".

== Work ==
Frommer taught for several years and then moved into business, becoming a Vice President, Special Projects Coordinator, Strategic Planner, and Writer-Researcher at Bentley Industries in Los Angeles. Frommer was also a writer for the 1989 film Step Into the Third Dimension. In 1996, he returned to USC as a full professor of clinical management communication at the Marshall School of Business. In 1999, he co-authored a linguistics workbook called Looking at Languages: A Workbook in Elementary Linguistics. From 2005 to 2008, he served as Director of the Center for Management Communication at Marshall School of Business.

After a search by James Cameron, writer and director of the 2009 film Avatar, Frommer was chosen to create a language for the Na'vi, the film's fictional alien race of sentient blue humanoid inhabitants of the moon Pandora. Frommer says that his process for creating the language began with phonetics and phonology: "The sound system has to be all nailed down first, so that there is consistency in the language". The morphology, syntax and vocabulary followed. Cameron had already created several dozen words that he wanted to incorporate into the new language. That gave Frommer "a sense of what kinds of sounds he had in mind". Cameron also told Frommer that he "wanted the language to be pleasant sounding and appealing to the audience." "When you create a language, you experience the joy of rolling sounds around in your mouth, hearing unusual sounds, playing with the sounds and structural properties of language – it's a process that took about six months for the basics".

Frommer also created the Barsoomian language for the Disney film John Carter.
