= Cleopatra (Gardner novel) =

1962 novel by Jeffrey K. Gardner

- Cover of the 1962 Pyramid Books paperback edition.
- Author: Jeffrey K. Gardner
- Cover artist: Robert Abbett
- Language: English
- Genre: Historical
- Publisher: Pyramid Books
- Publication date: 1962
- Publication place: United States
- Media type: Print (paperback)

Cleopatra is a novel written by Jeffrey K. Gardner, first published in 1962. with a cover painted by Robert Abbett.

The book is about Cleopatra, ruler of Egypt. It explores her secret life and many loves, including Julius Caesar and Mark Antony, one of Caesar's supporters. The novel is described as a "frank novel of a woman whose sensual appeal has never been equalled".
