= Burroughs (crater) =

Crater on Mars

- Planet: Mars
- Coordinates: 72.5°S 243.1°W
- Quadrangle: Mare Australe
- Diameter: 104.0 kilometres (64.6 mi)
- Eponym: Edgar Rice Burroughs

Burroughs is a large crater on Mars at latitude 72.5S / longitude 243.1W, with a diameter of 104.0 kilometres (64.6 mi).

The crater is named after Edgar Rice Burroughs, the American science fiction novelist who wrote a series of fantasy novels set on the planet.

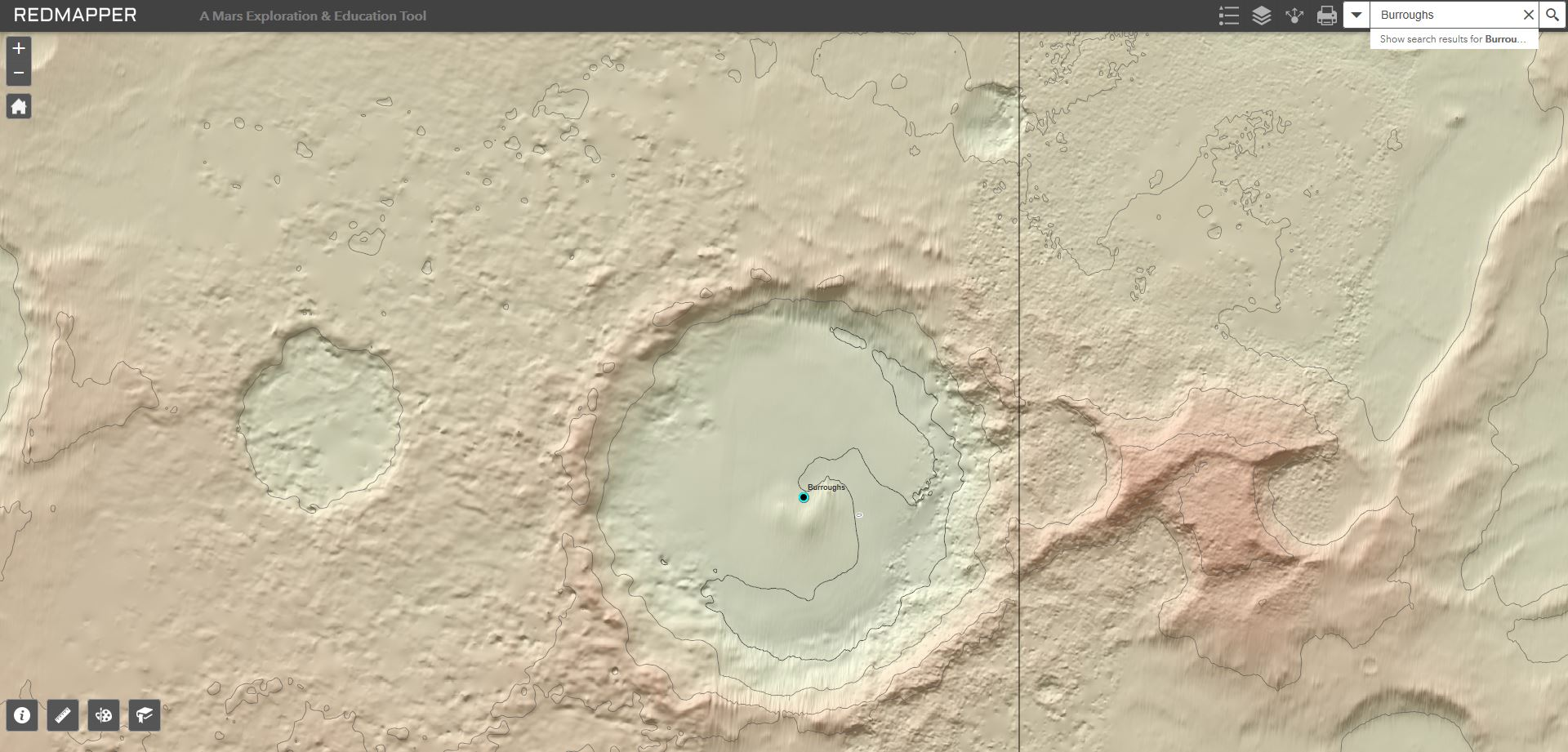

An ice deposit in Burroughs Crater contains strong evidence that recent Martian climate is influenced by changes in the planet's orbit and axial tilt.
