= Barsoomian language =

Fictional language

Barsoomian
- Martian
- Tharkian
- Created by: Paul Frommer, Edgar Rice Burroughs
- Date: 2010
- Setting and usage: 2012 film John Carter
- Purpose: constructed languages: artistic languages; fictional languages; Barsoomian
- Sources: constructed languages a priori languages

Language codes
- ISO 639-3: None (mis)
- Glottolog: None

Barsoomian is the constructed language of the fictional Barsoomians, the sapient humanoid inhabitants of Mars in the Barsoom series of novels by Edgar Rice Burroughs. It was developed from Burroughs' examples and descriptions by Paul Frommer for the 2012 film John Carter of Mars; Frommer also created the Na’vi language for Avatar.

Spoken Barsoomian has mostly lexical words, with the equivalent of grammatical words such as prepositions and pronouns conveyed telepathically. There are few inflections, and word order is fixed to verb–subject–object. Possession is indicated by juxtaposing the object with the possessor, as in Malay. There is a word that makes direct object definite, as in Hebrew. The vocabulary is relatively simple, with little poetic language.

Some inflection is found in the pronouns. For the object, the initial consonant is suffixed: tu "I", tut "me"; ki "he", kik "him". To form the plural, the consonants are voiced: du "we", dud "us", gi "they".

The effect of the language is staccato. There are ten vowels, five long and five short, transcribed short a e i o u and long aa ey ee oa oo; diphthongs are ao (as in how) and ay (as in high). Consonants are similar to English (b d j g, p t tj k, v z, f th s h, r l, m n, w y), with the addition of the velar fricatives ch [x] and gh [ɣ]. Consonants, both voiced and unvoiced, may also be long or short.

In the books it is mentioned that Barsoomian is the only language spoken on the entire planet of Barsoom. Therefore, there never are any language barriers between different people from Barsoom, no matter what country or city on the planet they originate from. Written versions of Barsoomian however can differ greatly between different cities.
