= Franklin M. Davis Jr. =

United States Army general

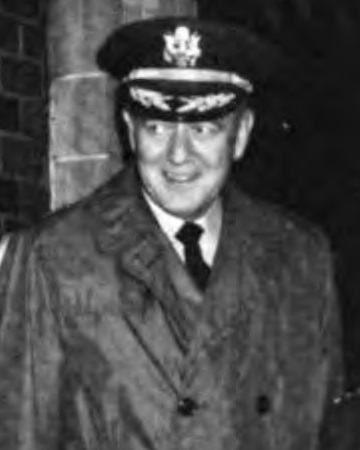
Maj. Gen. Franklin M. Davis Jr. in early 1972

Cover of 1959 Permabook paperback edition of Spearhead by Franklin M. Davis Jr.

Cover of 1961 Pyramid Books paperback edition of Kiss the Tiger by Col. Franklin M. Davis Jr.

Front cover of the 1967 Macmillan Company hardcover version of Come As A Conqueror by Franklin M. Davis Jr. The book was advertised the "first comprehensive history of the most difficult political-military operation in America's history: the U.S. Army's occupation of Germany 1945–1949."

Franklin Milton Davis Jr. (July 19, 1918 – May 4, 1981) was an author and major general in the United States Army.

== Early life and education ==
General Davis was born in Malden, Massachusetts, and raised in Waltham, Massachusetts. He earned a A.B. in Economics/English from Massachusetts State College in 1940. Davis was commissioned as a second lieutenant of cavalry through the Army ROTC program on June 10, 1940. He reported for active duty with the 3rd U.S. Cavalry at Fort Myer, Virginia on July 5, 1940. Davis transferred to the Regular Army on February 20, 1942, and graduated from the Command and General Staff School in January 1944. He later graduated from the Armed Forces Staff College in January 1958 and the Army War College in June 1960. Davis received an M.A. degree in international affairs from George Washington University in 1963.

== Military ==
Davis had military participation in both World War II and the Vietnam War. Between wars, he commanded the 82nd Reconnaissance Battalion, 2nd Armored Division in Europe from July 1951 to June 1952.

Davis served as a brigadier general during the Vietnam War and commanded the 199th Light Infantry Brigade from May 1968 to July 1969. Davis' brigade operated in the Long Binh and Duc Hoa regions of Vietnam. While in Vietnam, Davis was wounded in action (WIA).

Davis received a temporary promotion to major general on June 1, 1970, which was made permanent on April 5, 1971. He was a commandant of the U.S. Army War College from 1971 to 1974, when he retired from active duty.

Davis's principal awards and decorations included two Distinguished Service Medals, the Distinguished Flying Cross, two awards of the Legion of Merit, the Purple Heart and the Bronze Star Medal with V for Valor. His wartime service included three major campaigns in World War II in Europe, and four in the war in Vietnam.

== Transcendental Meditation ==
Davis was a practitioner of Transcendental Meditation and advocated its use to reduce the stress of soldiers. He was also a founding member of the board of trustees at Maharishi International University (MIU) (now called Maharishi University of Management). At MIU, General Davis was also an International Resource Faculty member for the United States in Military Science.

== Writing ==
In 1950, Davis wrote for a contest that was designed to "stimulate creative writing among [military] personnel during their off-duty time." He was among three winners of the Army-wide writing contest. One of the prizes for the honor was to be published in Collier's magazine.

Davis wrote books of fiction and historical nonfiction. Two of his early books were published with his military rank attached to his name: "Col. Franklin M. Davis Jr.":

- Kiss the Tiger, (A Quinn Leland Espionage Thriller) Pyramid Books, 1961
- The U.S. Army Engineers—Fighting Elite, Franklin Watts, 1967 OCLC 6582068

Davis' books published without rank are:

- The Naked and the Lost, Lion, 1954. Subject is the Korean War, 1950–1953
- Spearhead, Permabook, 1957. Subject 3rd Armored Division (Spearhead) during World War II.
- A Medal For Frankie, Pocket Books, 1959. 35 cents.
- Break Through, 1961
- Bamboo Camp #10, 1962
- Secret Hong Kong (A Quinn Leland Espionage Thriller), 1962
- Combat! The Counterattack, (Illustrated by Arnie Kohn), 1964
- Come As a Conqueror, (The United States Army's Occupation of Germany 1945–1949. Nonfiction), 1967
- Across the Rhine (Time Life, World War II Collector's Edition), 1980 ISBN 0-809-42543-2 OCLC 5893369

== Personal ==
Davis married Erma Stuart Alvord (September 17, 1918 – August 28, 2003) at Fort Benning, Georgia on July 18, 1942. They had two sons and three grandchildren. Their eldest son, First Lieutenant Stephen Winfield Davis (November 6, 1943 – August 18, 1967), was killed in action in Vietnam. General Davis had arrived in Vietnam for the first time only two weeks before and accompanied the body back to the United States for burial.

Davis and his wife lived in Arlington, Virginia. He died from cancer at the Walter Reed Army Medical Center in Washington, D.C. at age 62. After his death, his wife moved to Charleston, South Carolina to be closer to their younger son and his family. Davis is buried alongside his wife and eldest son at Arlington National Cemetery.
