= The Master Mind of Mars =

1928 novel by Edgar Rice Burroughs

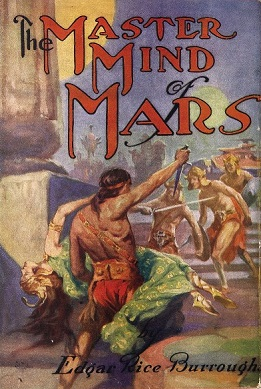
- Dust-jacket of The Master Mind of Mars
- Author: Edgar Rice Burroughs
- Language: English
- Series: Barsoom
- Genre: Science fantasy
- Publisher: A. C. McClurg
- Publication date: 1928
- Publication place: United States
- Media type: Print (hardback & paperback)
- Pages: 312
- Preceded by: The Chessmen of Mars
- Followed by: A Fighting Man of Mars

The Master Mind of Mars is a science fantasy novel by American writer Edgar Rice Burroughs, the sixth of his Barsoom series. Burroughs' working titles for the novel were A Weird Adventure on Mars and Vad Varo of Barsoom. It was first published in the magazine Amazing Stories Annual vol. 1, on July 15, 1927. The first book edition was published by A. C. McClurg in March, 1928.

Burroughs had been unable to place the novel in his standard, higher-paying markets like the Munsey magazines and the Street & Smith line. Some critics have speculated the publishers were put off by its satirical treatment of religious fundamentalists. He eventually sold it to publisher Hugo Gernsback for $1,250: only a third of the rate paid by magazines like Argosy All-Story, where the previous book in the series had first appeared. Gernsback chose the novel's final title and made it the cover feature in his newest magazine.

== Plot summary ==
In this novel Burroughs shifts the focus of the series for the second time, the first having been from early protagonists John Carter and Dejah Thoris to their children after the third book. Now he moves to a completely unrelated hero, Ulysses Paxton, an Earthman like Carter who like him is sent to Mars by looking at the red planet in the sky.

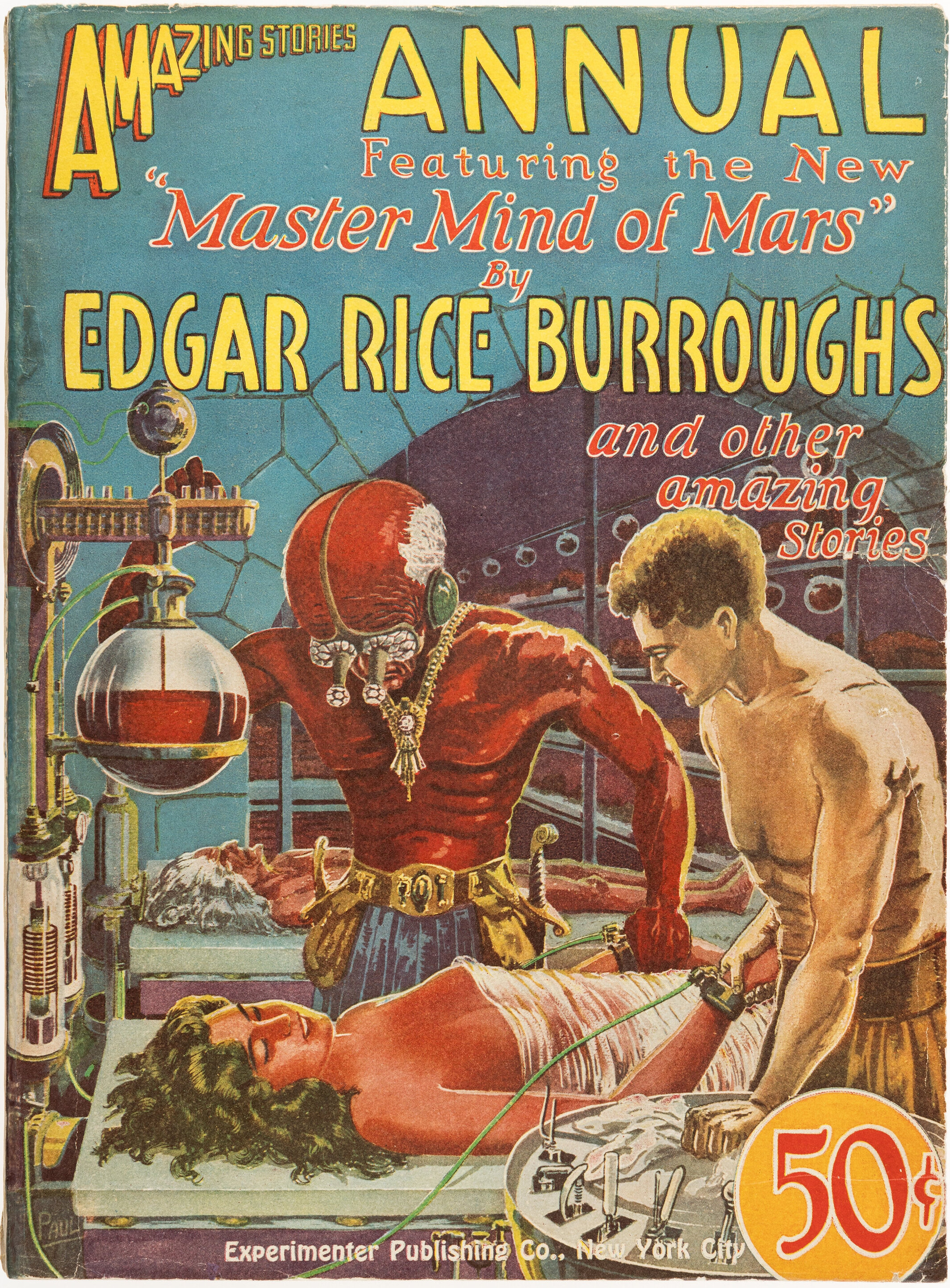
Original 1927 magazine publication

On Mars, Paxton is taken in by elderly mad scientist Ras Thavas, the "Master Mind" of the title, who educates him in the ways of Barsoom and bestows on him the Martian name Vad Varo. Ras has perfected techniques of transplanting brains, which he uses to provide rich elderly Martians with youthful new bodies for a profit. Distrustful of his fellow Martians, he trains Paxton as his assistant to perform the same operation on him. But Paxton has fallen in love with Valla Dia, one of Ras' young victims, whose body has been swapped for that of the hag Xaxa, Jeddara (empress) of the city-state of Phundahl. He refuses to operate on Ras until his mentor promises to restore her to her rightful body. A quest for that body ensues, in which Paxton is aided by others of Ras' experimental victims, and in the end he attains the hand of his Valla Dia, who in a happy plot twist turns out to be a princess.

== Setting ==
=== Scientific basis ===
Burroughs vision of Mars was loosely inspired by astronomical speculation of the time, especially that of Percival Lowell, who saw the planet as a formerly Earthlike world now becoming less hospitable to life due to its advanced age, whose inhabitants had built canals to bring water from the polar caps to irrigate the remaining arable land. Lowell was influenced by Italian astronomer, Giovanni Virginio Schiaparelli, who in 1878, had observed features on Mars he called canali (Italian for "channels"). A misunderstanding that "canals" implied water, fueled belief that the planet was inhabited. The theory of an inhabited planet with flowing water was disproved by data provided by Russian and American probes such as the two Viking missions which found a dead, frozen world where water could not exist in a fluid state.

=== World of Barsoom ===
A million years before the narrative commences, Mars was a lush world with oceans. As the oceans receded, and the atmosphere grew thin, the planet has devolved into a landscape of partial barbarism; living on an aging planet, with dwindling resources, the inhabitants of Barsoom have become hardened and warlike, fighting one another to survive. Barsoomians distribute scarce water supplies via a worldwide system of canals, controlled by quarreling city-states. The thinning Martian atmosphere is artificially replenished from an "atmosphere plant".

It is a world with clear territorial divisions between White, Yellow, Black, Red and Green skinned races. Each has particular traits and qualities, which seem to define the characters of almost every individual within them. Burroughs' concept of race in Barsoom, is more similar to species than ethnicity.

== Relationship to other works ==
Ras Thavas reappears later in the series to perform more mad science in the novel Synthetic Men of Mars.

L. Sprague de Camp enlisted Ras Thavas as guide to Barsoom for his hero Harold Shea in his short story "Sir Harold of Zodanga" (1995).

== Copyright ==
The copyright for this story was not renewed by December 31, 1955 and therefore is in the public domain.

== Sources ==
- Bleiler, Everett (1948). The Checklist of Fantastic Literature. Chicago: Shasta Publishers. p. 67.
