= Swords of Mars =

1935 novel by Edgar Rice Burroughs

- Dust-jacket of Swords of Mars
- Author: Edgar Rice Burroughs
- Language: English
- Series: Barsoom
- Genre: Science fantasy
- Publisher: Edgar Rice Burroughs, Inc.
- Publication date: 1934-1935
- Publication place: United States
- Media type: Print (hardback & paperback)
- Pages: 315
- Preceded by: A Fighting Man of Mars
- Followed by: Synthetic Men of Mars

Swords of Mars is a science fantasy novel by American writer Edgar Rice Burroughs, the eighth of his Barsoom series. It was first published in the magazine Blue Book as a six-part serial in the issues for November 1934 to April 1935. The first book edition was published by Edgar Rice Burroughs, Inc. in February 1936.

== Plot introduction ==
Swords of Mars begins as a cloak and dagger thriller and ends as an interplanetary odyssey. In this novel John Carter, transplanted Earthman, returns to his status of protagonist and first-person narrator for the first time since the third Martian novel, The Warlord of Mars.

== Plot summary ==
Carter relates an adventure commencing with a private war he and his picked followers have been waging against the resurgent Guild of Assassins, led by Ur Jan. Hoping to cut off the threat at the root, he travels undercover to the Assassins' base, the restive city of Zodanga, still smarting from its defeat and sack by the Empire of Helium and the horde of Tharks in A Princess of Mars. There Carter passes himself off into the underworld as Vandor, a freelance bravo, cultivating small-time criminal Rapas the Ulsio and attempting to penetrate the ranks of the Guild.

Simultaneously, Carter becomes embroiled in the affairs of two rival scientists, Fal Sivas and Gar Nal, who are competing against each other to create a viable "synthetic brain"-controlled spacecraft. Complications ensue as the two threads of the plot become entangled, and the Guild, in its own attempt at a preemptive strike against Carter, kidnaps his wife, the princess Dejah Thoris of Helium.

For the first time the action of the series goes off-planet, as Ur Jan and Gar Nal flee with Dejah to the Martian moon Thuria (Phobos) in one of the spacecraft, pursued by Carter and his allies Jat Or and Zanda in the other. The passage shrinks the travelers down until to them the tiny moon is the size of a planet.

There, all are captured by the sun-worshipping Tarids, white-skinned and blue-haired natives of Thuria (which they call Ladan) whose mental powers render them invisible to the spacefarers. To win freedom from their jeweled prison, the antagonists must join forces with each other, aided by another captive, the one-eyed and two-mouthed chameleon-like "cat-man" Umka.

Amid betrayal and a heroic sacrifice, the parties from Mars eventually return to their home planet with Carter and Dejah still separated and the latter believed to still be captive on Thuria. In a final twist, she is revealed as still in the hands of Gar Nal, whom Ur Jan, honoring his earlier pledge of fealty to Carter, redeems himself by dispatching.

== Hidden dedication ==
The first letter of the preface and the subsequent twenty-four chapters of the book form an acrostic message from the author to his second wife Florence, whom he was in the process of marrying at the time of publication. The message reads "To Florence with all My Love Ed."

== Copyright ==
The copyright for this story has expired in Australia, and thus now resides in the public domain there. The text is available via Project Gutenberg Australia.
