= Llana of Gathol =

1941 novel by Edgar Rice Burroughs

- Dust-jacket of Llana of Gathol
- Author: Edgar Rice Burroughs
- Language: English
- Series: Barsoom
- Genre: Science fantasy
- Publisher: Edgar Rice Burroughs, Inc.
- Publication date: 1948
- Publication place: United States
- Media type: Print (hardback & paperback)
- Preceded by: Synthetic Men of Mars
- Followed by: John Carter of Mars

Llana of Gathol is a collection of four science fantasy stories by American writer Edgar Rice Burroughs, which were originally published in Amazing Stories in 1941. The first collected edition of Llana of Gathol was published in 1948 with an apparently new foreword. It is the penultimate book in the Barsoom series and the last to be published during Burroughs's lifetime.

The stories in Llana of Gathol have a somewhat more humorous tone than earlier entries of the Barsoom series, and this book is considered to be an example of Burroughs engaging in self-parody late in his career.

== Stories ==
- "The Ancient Dead" (originally "The City of Mummies")
- "The Black Pirates of Barsoom"
- "Escape on Mars" (originally "Yellow Men of Mars")
- "Invisible Men of Mars"

== Plot summary ==
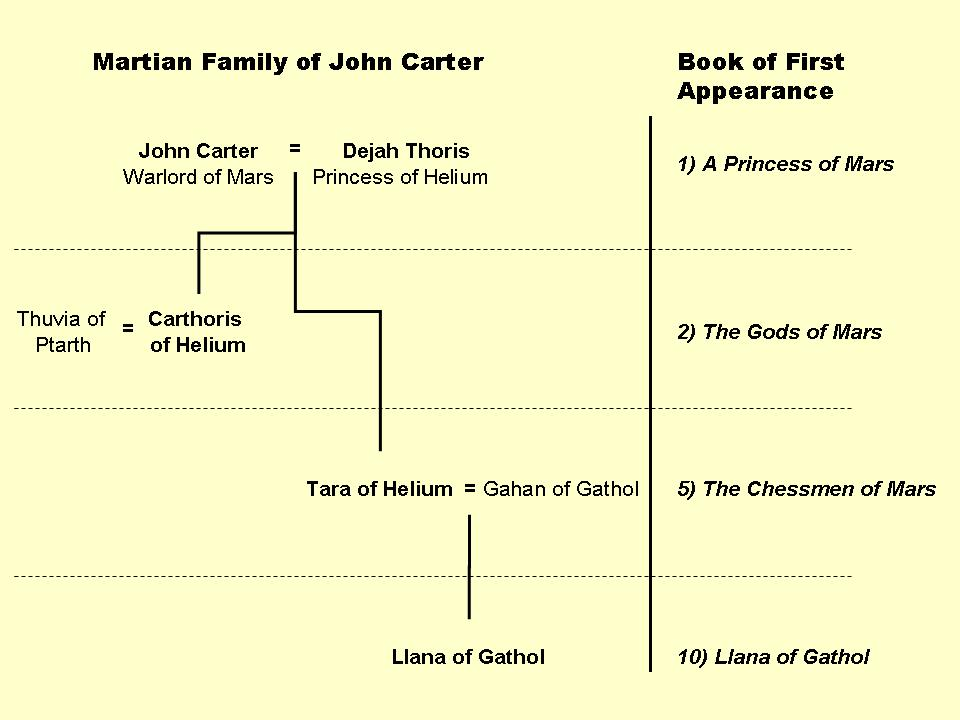
John Carter's descendants

The stories in this collection revolve around John Carter's granddaughter Llana of Gathol, who plays the "damsel in distress" role played by Dejah Thoris and Thuvia in earlier entries of the Barsoom series.

In search of solitude, John Carter flies to the deserted city of Horz. By one of those coincidences which are common in Burroughs's books, he discovers his own granddaughter, Llana of Gathol, who is being held captive. The subsequent attempts to get Llana safely back home bring Carter, Llana and Pan Dan Chee, a young man they pick up along the way, through a series of adventures. They meet an ancient, mad hypnotist who has preserved people for nearly a million years by the power of hypnotism. They find a valley occupied by Black Men who imprison them. They travel to the land of Pankor where soldiers are frozen and kept in reserve until needed for a war. Finally they reach the land of Invak where the inhabitants have mastered the art of invisibility.

== Influence ==
The book's title was aped by that of the later novel Ylana of Callisto by Lin Carter, a volume in his Burroughs-inspired Callisto series.

== Copyright ==
The copyright for this story has expired in Australia, and thus now resides in the public domain there. The text is available via Project Gutenberg Australia.

Since the author died more than 70 years ago, the copyright has expired in the European Union and all Burroughs's books are in the public domain there.
