= A Fighting Man of Mars =

1931 novel by Edgar Rice Burroughs

- dust-jacket for A Fighting Man of Mars
- Author: Edgar Rice Burroughs
- Language: English
- Series: Barsoom
- Genre: Science fantasy novel
- Publisher: Metropolitan Books
- Publication date: 1930
- Publication place: United States
- Media type: Print (Hardback)
- Pages: 319
- Preceded by: The Master Mind of Mars
- Followed by: Swords of Mars

A Fighting Man of Mars is a science fantasy novel by American writer Edgar Rice Burroughs, the seventh of his Barsoom series. Burroughs began writing it on February 28, 1929, and the finished story was first published in The Blue Book Magazine as a six-part serial in the issues for April to September 1930. It was later published as a complete novel by Metropolitan in May 1931.

== Plot summary ==
Like many other Burroughs stories, A Fighting Man of Mars resembles The Arabian Nights. The story is purportedly relayed back to earth via the Gridley Wave, a sort of super radio frequency previously introduced in Tanar of Pellucidar, the third of Burrough's Pellucidar novels, which thus provides a link between the two series. The story-teller is Ulysses Paxton, protagonist of the previous novel, The Master Mind of Mars, but this story is not about him; rather, it is the tale of Tan Hadron of Hastor, a lowly, poor padwar (a low-ranking officer) who is in love with the beautiful, haughty Sanoma Tora, daughter of Tor Hatan, a minor but rich noble. As he is only a padwar, Sanoma spurns him. Then Sanoma Tora is kidnapped, and the novel moves into high gear.

As Tan Hadron crosses Mars ("Barsoom", as Burroughs calls it) searching for Sanoma Tora, he encounters some of Barsoom's most ferocious beasts: huge, many-armed, flesh-eating white apes, gigantic spiders, and the insane cannibals of U-Gor. He also meets the mad scientist Phor Tak, who cackles "Heigh-oo!" and is crazed with the desire for revenge.

The initial simplicity of Burroughs' well-worn pursuit plot is elaborated by Hadron's rescue of an escaped slave, Tavia, from a band of six-limbed Green Martians of Torquas, en route to the city of Jahar where Hadron believes Sanoma Tora has been taken. Tavia is an atypical Burroughs heroine; depicted as self-reliant and competent with weapons, witty and intelligent, she compares favorably for both reader and Hadron with beautiful but shallow Sanoma Tora, who ultimately shows herself unworthy of the virtuous hero. With the addition of Nur An, a disaffected Jaharian warrior, and another escaped woman slave, Phao, Hadron's quest becomes more collaborative than Burroughs' usual, although Tavia, in an unsurprising plot development, is revealed to be a princess at the end.

== Copyright ==
The copyright for this story was not renewed by December 31, 1955, in the United States and therefore is in the public domain. It is available on Project Gutenberg and LibriVox.org.

The copyright for this story has expired in Australia and in Canada, and thus now resides in the public domain there. The text is available via Project Gutenberg Australia and Faded Page.

== Reception ==
Floyd C. Gale of Galaxy Science Fiction said that "Burroughs's choice of a model was a wise one. The Arabian Nights are corking good adventure stories in their own right".

== Influence ==
In 1973, George Lucas used the first chapter of this novel as the basis for an unfinished, two-page draft titled Journal of the Whills, the direct predecessor to Star Wars.
