= Synthetic Men of Mars =

1940 novel by Edgar Rice Burroughs

- Cover of the first edition
- Author: Edgar Rice Burroughs
- Language: English
- Series: Barsoom
- Genre: Science fantasy
- Publisher: Edgar Rice Burroughs, Inc.
- Publication date: 1940
- Publication place: United States
- Media type: Print (hardback & paperback)
- Preceded by: Swords of Mars
- Followed by: Llana of Gathol

Synthetic Men of Mars is a science fantasy novel by American writer Edgar Rice Burroughs, the ninth of his Barsoom series. It was first published in the magazine Argosy Weekly in six parts in early 1939. The first complete edition of the novel was published in 1940 by Edgar Rice Burroughs, Inc.

Despite a successful career stretching back more than two decades, Burroughs had trouble finding a publisher for the serialized version of the novel. Both Liberty and Blue Book turned him down; Argosy was his third choice. He received US$1200 for the magazine rights.

== Plot ==
Like several previous novels in the Barsoom series, Synthetic Men introduces a completely new character as its protagonist: Vor Daj, a padwar (warrior) from Helium and a member of John Carter's personal guard. Vor Daj narrates the action in the first person, so that when John Carter appears in the story, he is described in the third person (unlike other Barsoomian novels that feature Carter as the first-person narrator). The novel also brings back a familiar character, Ras Thavas, the amoral mad scientist from the earlier novel The Master Mind of Mars.

John Carter and Vor Daj seek Thavas's surgical aid for Carter's wife Dejah Thoris, injured in an accident. Thavas, however, proves hard to find. Since the events of Master Mind he has transferred his base to a hidden location, which is ultimately found to be the dead city of Morbus in the Toonolian Marshes. There he has been experimenting in growing monstrous synthetic human beings called hormads. The most intelligent of these turn on him and force him to grow an army of hormads with which to conquer Barsoom. They also force their captive to transplant their brains into the bodies of imprisoned normal Martians.

Captured by the hormads and imprisoned with Ras Thavas, Carter and Daj plot with the scientist against the synthetic man. Vor Daj's brain is transplanted into the body of a hormad named Tor-dur-bar to enable him to spy on their captors, and his adventures form the bulk of the story. He falls in love with a fellow captive, the red woman Janai of Amhor, but his love seems hopeless while his consciousness resides in the body of a monster, particularly after it seems that his original body has been destroyed.

Meanwhile, Carter and Thavas escape; the latter cures Dejah Thoris, and the two ultimately return to Morbus with a great fleet of airships from Helium. Vor Daj is recovered and Morbus, which has been overrun by a huge mass of cancerously growing hormad flesh, is destroyed with incendiary bombs. Ras Thavas then restores Vor Daj to his original body, freeing him to wed Janai.

== Reception ==
Reception of the novel has been mixed. A noted Burroughs scholar, Richard Lupoff, concludes that the novel "has little to recommend it." On the other hand, Burroughs' biographer, John Taliaferro, regards Synthetic Men as "imaginative," and considers it superior to his other work of the late 1930s.

== Copyright ==
The copyright for this story has expired in Australia, and thus now resides in the public domain there. The text is available via Project Gutenberg Australia.
