= John Carter of Mars (collection) =

Book by American writer Edgar Rice Burroughs

- Dust-jacket of first edition
- Author: Edgar Rice Burroughs, John Coleman Burroughs
- Language: English
- Series: Barsoom
- Genre: Science fantasy
- Publisher: Canaveral Press
- Publication date: 1964
- Publication place: United States
- Media type: Print (Hardback & Paperback)
- Preceded by: Llana of Gathol

Cover of the "Better Little Book" John Carter of Mars.

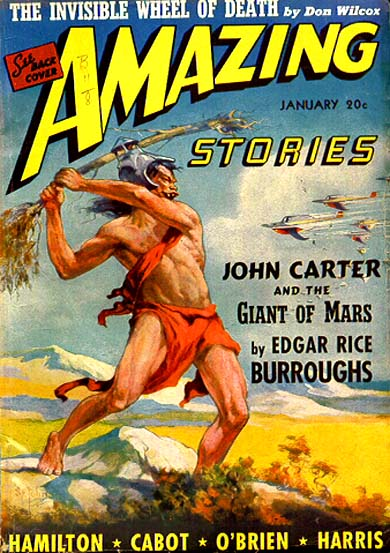
"John Carter and the Giant of Mars" was the cover story in the January 1941 Amazing Stories

John Carter of Mars is the eleventh and final book in the Barsoom series by American writer Edgar Rice Burroughs. It is not a novel, but rather a collection of two John Carter of Mars stories.

The first story was originally published in 1940 by Whitman as a Better Little Book entitled John Carter of Mars. Although credited to Edgar Rice Burroughs, it was written (and illustrated) by his son, John Coleman Burroughs and was later expanded and re-published in the January issue of Amazing Stories in 1941 as "John Carter and the Giant of Mars", the name it goes under in the collection.

The second story, "Skeleton Men of Jupiter", was first published in Amazing Stories in 1943. Intended as the first in a series of novelettes to be later collected in book form, in the fashion of Llana of Gathol, it ends with the plot unresolved, and the intended sequels were never written. Several other writers have written pastiche endings for the story.

The first edition of John Carter of Mars (a title that Burroughs never used for any book in the Barsoom series) was published in 1964 by Canaveral Press, fourteen years after his death.

== Reception ==
This book is not highly regarded by fans of the Barsoom series and is generally considered something of an afterthought. However, in the book Master of Adventure: The Worlds of Edgar Rice Burroughs, Richard A. Lupoff, the editor of the 1964 Canaveral Press edition of John Carter of Mars, writes that it is interesting for its contrast between "real" Burroughs (Skeleton Men of Jupiter) and "ersatz" Burroughs (John Carter and the Giant of Mars).

== Copyright ==
The copyright for this book has expired in Australia, and thus now resides in the public domain there. The text is available via Project Gutenberg Australia.
