= Barsoom =

Fictional representation of the planet Mars by Edgar Rice Burroughs

Barsoom/Mars Series
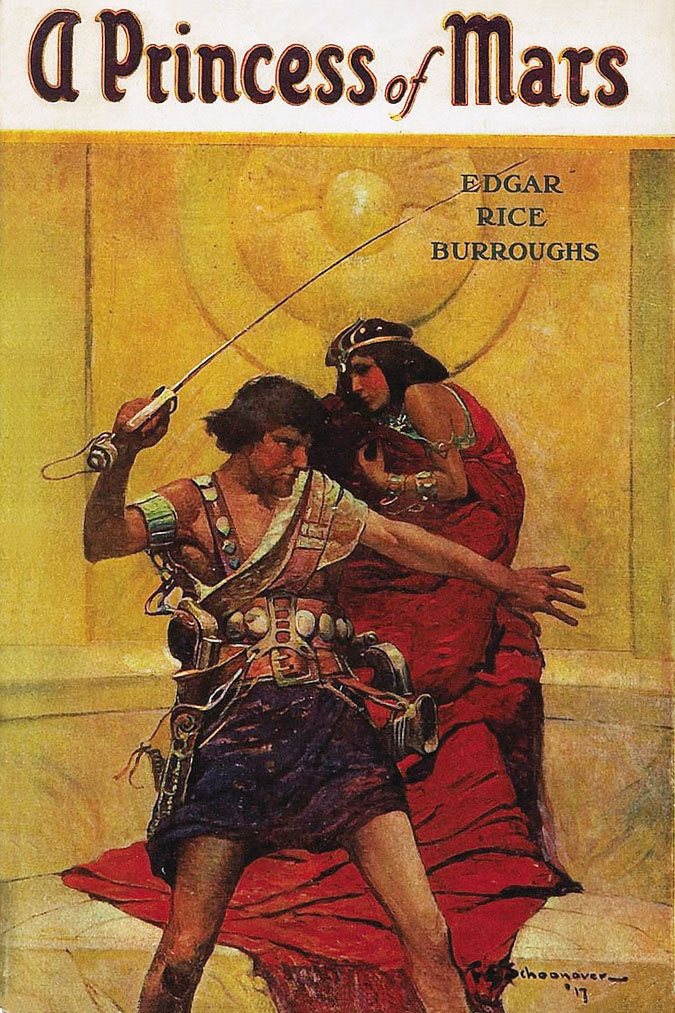
- A Princess of Mars by Edgar Rice Burroughs, McClurg, 1917
- A Princess of Mars (1912); The Gods of Mars (1913); The Warlord of Mars (1913–14); Thuvia, Maid of Mars (1916); The Chessmen of Mars (1922); The Master Mind of Mars (1927); A Fighting Man of Mars (1930); Swords of Mars (1934–35); Synthetic Men of Mars (1939); Llana of Gathol (1941); John Carter of Mars (1964)
- Author: Edgar Rice Burroughs
- Country: USA
- Language: English
- Published: 1912–1948, 1964
- No. of books: 11

Barsoom
- Barsoom location
- Created by: Edgar Rice Burroughs
- Genre: Planetary romance

In-universe information
- Type: Planet
- Ethnic groups: Tharks, Warhoons, Torquas, Thurds; Orovars, Lotharians, Therns
- Races: Red Martians, Green Martians, Yellow Martians, White Martians, Black Martians (First Born)
- Locations: Helium, Zodanga, Ptarth, Gathol, Toonolian Marshes, Valley Dor, Okar
- Characters: John Carter, Dejah Thoris, Tars Tarkas, Ulysses Paxton, Ras Thavas

Barsoom is a fictional representation of the planet Mars created by American pulp fiction author Edgar Rice Burroughs. The first Barsoom tale was serialized as Under the Moons of Mars in pulp magazine The All-Story from February to July 1912 and published compiled as a novel as A Princess of Mars in 1917. It features John Carter, a late-19th-century American Confederate veteran who is mysteriously transported from Earth to the dying world of Mars where he meets and romances the beautiful Martian princess Dejah Thoris. Ten sequels followed over the next three decades, further extending his vision of Barsoom and adding other characters.

The Barsoom series, particularly the first novel, is considered a major influence on early science fiction.

== Series ==
Burroughs began writing the Barsoom books in the second half of 1911 and produced one volume a year between 1911 and 1914; seven more were produced between 1921 and 1941. The first Barsoom tale was serialized in The All-Story magazine as Under the Moons of Mars (1911), and then published in hardcover as the complete novel A Princess of Mars (1917). The final Barsoom tale was a novella, Skeleton Men of Jupiter, published in Amazing Stories in February 1943. The novel editions of A Princess of Mars, The Gods of Mars and Llana of Gathol contain newly written forewords describing Edgar Rice Burroughs' interactions with John Carter, who is described as Burroughs' great-uncle.

Collectively, this series of novels has been referred to as the Martian Series.

Order	Title	Published as serial	Published as novel	Fictional narrator	Year in novel
1	A Princess of Mars	February–July 1912, All-Story	October 1917, McClurg	John Carter	1866–1876
2	The Gods of Mars	January–May 1913, All-Story	September 1918, McClurg	John Carter	1886
3	The Warlord of Mars	December 1913 – March 1914, All-Story	September 1919, McClurg	John Carter	1887–1888
4	Thuvia, Maid of Mars	April 1916, All-Story Weekly	October 1920, McClurg	third person	1888~1898
5	The Chessmen of Mars	February–March 1922, Argosy All-Story Weekly	November 1922, McClurg	third person	1898~1917
6	The Master Mind of Mars	July 15, 1927, Amazing Stories Annual	March 1928, McClurg	Ulysses Paxton	1917
7	A Fighting Man of Mars	April–September 1930, Blue Book	May 1931, Metropolitan	Tan Hadron	1928
8	Swords of Mars	November 1934 – April 1935, Blue Book	February 1936, Burroughs	John Carter	1928~1934
9	Synthetic Men of Mars	January–February 1939, Argosy Weekly	March 1940, Burroughs	Vor Daj	1934~1938
10	Llana of Gathol	March–October 1941, Amazing Stories	March 1948, Burroughs	John Carter	1938~1940
11	John Carter of Mars – A collection of two novellas. John Carter and the Giant of Mars (attributed to John Coleman Burroughs)	January 1941, Amazing Stories	July 1964, Canaveral	third person	1940
11	Skeleton Men of Jupiter (attributed to Edgar Rice Burroughs)	February 1943, Amazing Stories	July 1964, Canaveral	John Carter	1941–1942

=== Etymology ===
Burroughs frequently invented words of the languages spoken by the people in his novels, and used these extensively in the narrative. In Thuvia, Maid of Mars he included a glossary of Barsoomian words used in the first four novels. The word "Barsoom", the native Martian word for Mars, is composed of the Martian name for planet, "soom", and the Martian word for eight, "bar". This reflects counting Mars as the eighth body in the inner solar system, by counting not just planets, but the Sun and the satellites of Earth and of Mars.

=== Character focus ===
A Princess of Mars, the first novel in the Barsoom series, with its sequels The Gods of Mars and The Warlord of Mars, form a trilogy centered upon protagonist John Carter and damsel in distress Dejah Thoris. John Carter's and Dejah Thoris's son Carthoris is also introduced as a minor character in The Gods of Mars, as is Thuvia.

Three other books focus on their descendants: Carthoris, in Thuvia, Maid of Mars, his sister, Tara of Helium, in The Chessmen of Mars, and Tara's daughter, Llana of Gathol, in Llana of Gathol.

Ulysses Paxton, another Earth man transported to Mars, is the focus of The Master Mind of Mars, and the rest of the books focus on John Carter's later adventures (Swords of Mars and John Carter of Mars), or on native Martian characters (A Fighting Man of Mars and Synthetic Men of Mars).

=== Form ===
Most of the Barsoom books are novels, but two are collections of shorter works: Llana of Gathol has four linked novelettes, originally published in Amazing Stories during 1941, and John Carter of Mars is composed of two novellas.

Most are first-person narratives. John Carter narrates A Princess of Mars, The Gods of Mars, The Warlord of Mars, Swords of Mars, the four novellas in Llana of Gathol, and "Skeleton Men of Jupiter" in John Carter of Mars. Ulysses Paxton narrates one, The Master Mind of Mars. Martian guardsman Vor Daj narrates Synthetic Men of Mars, and Martian navy officer Tan Hadron narrates A Fighting Man of Mars. Two other novels, Thuvia, Maid of Mars and The Chessmen of Mars, are written in the third person, as is "John Carter and the Giant of Mars" in John Carter of Mars.

==== Introductions ====
Beginning with A Princess of Mars, Burroughs established a practice which continued in the four sequels of introducing the novel as if a factual account passed on to him personally, wherein John Carter appears as an avuncular figure known to his family for years. The same device appears in several sequels: The Gods of Mars; The Chessmen of Mars; Swords of Mars; and Llana of Gathol.

=== Authorship ===
All the Barsoom tales were published under the name of Edgar Rice Burroughs, except Under the Moons of Mars, the first publication of A Princess of Mars, which was published under the pseudonym "Norman Bean". Burroughs had actually typed "Normal Bean" (meaning not insane) on his submitted manuscript; but his publisher's typesetter changed it to "Norman". The first novella in John Carter of Mars, "John Carter and the Giant of Mars", is thought to have been penned by Burroughs' son John "Jack" Coleman Burroughs, although allegedly revised by his father. It was recognized by fans, upon publication, as unlikely of being Burroughs' work, as the writing is of a juvenile quality compared with that of Burroughs' other stories.

=== Genre ===
The stories are science fantasy, belonging to the subgenre planetary romance, which has strong elements of both science fiction and fantasy. Planetary romance stories are similar to sword and sorcery tales, but include scientific aspects. They mostly take place on the surface of an alien world, frequently include sword fighting, monsters, supernatural elements such as telepathic abilities, and civilizations similar to Earth in pre-technological eras, particularly with the inclusion of dynastic or religious social structures. Spacecraft appear in the stories, but are not central to the story. The series can also be classified as the closely related genre sword and planet, which consists of what are essentially sword and sorcery stories that take place on another planet.

The stories also share a number of elements with westerns in that they feature desert landscapes, women taken captive and a final confrontation with the antagonist.

Burroughs' Barsoom stories are considered seminal planetary romances. While examples existed prior to the publication of his works, they are the principal influence on the many works of this type that followed. His style of planetary romance has ceased to be written and published in the mainstream, though his books remain in print.

=== Plot ===
Like most of Burroughs' fiction, the novels in the series are mostly travelogues, feature copious violence, and often depict civilized heroes captured by uncivilized cultures and mimicking their captors to survive.

Most Barsoom novels follow a familiar plot structure wherein a hero is forced to a far-off location in search of a woman kidnapped by an odious but powerful villain.

Female characters are likely to be virtuous and fight off amorous advances and other dangers until able to connect with the hero; who himself fights a variety of enemies and deposes petty rulers of severely repressed populations, usually with the assistance of a native.

=== Motifs ===
The world of Barsoom is morally unambiguous: characters are either good or evil; there is no sense of moral relativity. A sense of honor transcends race or political affiliation, and characters fight alongside one another and against their adversaries because it is the right thing to do. Qualities of compassion, loyalty, and bravery are celebrated, while callousness, deception, and cowardice are deprecated.

Typically the novels include descriptions of aspects of the Martian world such as the architecture, and the presence of desolate landscapes punctuated by abandoned cities, technological achievements, advanced medicine, cultural elements such as religious practices and eating habits, breeding practices, and methods of population control. Many lost cities and civilizations and journeys into forgotten underworlds appear across the series, and the environment beyond the cities is populated by a variety of ferocious beasts, many roughly equivalent with Earth creatures and most bearing multiple sets of limbs. There are numerous examples of striking coincidences and dei ex machina usually to the benefit of the protagonists.

Mad scientists also appear, Ras Thavas from The Master Mind of Mars and Synthetic Men of Mars being the principal example, although another plays a prominent role in A Fighting Man of Mars. Instances of the use of superstition by religious cults to control and manipulate others are also common.

A Princess of Mars was possibly the first fiction of the 20th century to feature a constructed language; although Barsoomian was not particularly developed, it did add verisimilitude to the narrative.

=== Villains ===
Most villains in the Barsoom series are implacably evil or are rulers or despots of major empires or of hidden fiefdoms. They are usually hated by their subjects and possess a voracious sexual appetite, usually directed towards the heroine. The pattern is established by Tharkian Jeddak Tal Hajus in the first novel, A Princess of Mars. Further examples include Salensus Oll of The Warlord of Mars, Nutus of Dusar in Thuvia, Maid of Mars, and Ul Vas, Jeddak of the Tarids in Swords of Mars.

== Principal characters ==
=== Earthmen ===
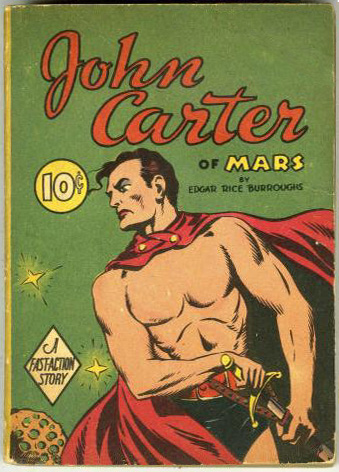
John Carter, as depicted on the cover of the Dell Big Little Book - John Carter of Mars (1940).

- John Carter: Captain John Carter is an Earthman who originated in Virginia. He fought in the American Civil war on the Confederate side. After the war he moved to the southwest US to work as a prospector. In 1866 he and his prospector partner struck it rich, but the partner was killed by American Indians, and Carter took refuge in a cave, where he was overcome by smoke that was some kind of cave gas, and while looking up at Mars in the sky, he is then teleported to Mars. He effectively disappeared for ten years [while on Mars], and was believed dead, but re-emerged in New York in 1876, settling on the Hudson. He appeared to die in 1886, leaving instructions for Burroughs, who refers to him as an 'uncle', to entomb him in a crypt, and leaving Burroughs with the manuscript of A Princess of Mars with instructions not to publish it for another 21 years. He has no memory before the age of 30 and seems never to age. He is adept with command, horsemanship, swords, and all weapons. He is 6 ft 2 in (1.88 m) tall, with black hair and steel-gray eyes. He is honorable, courageous, and eternally optimistic, even in the face of certain death. On Mars, he encounters both formidable alien creatures and various warring Martian races, wins the hand of Martian princess Dejah Thoris, and rises to the position of Warlord of Mars. Carter is the protagonist of the first three novels, which together comprise the initial trilogy. Carter also headlines the eighth, tenth, and eleventh books, as well as being a major secondary character in the fourth and ninth novels.
- Ulysses Paxton: The central character in The Master Mind of Mars. Paxton is a soldier in the First World War who is transported to Barsoom after he is mortally wounded, and subsequently becomes an assistant to Barsoomian scientist Ras Thavas.

=== Martians ===
- Dejah Thoris: A Princess of Helium; courageous, chaste, and resourceful despite frequent abduction by villains. The daughter of Mors Kajak, Jed (prince or king) of Lesser Helium and granddaughter of Tardos Mors, Jeddak (king or emperor) of Helium, she is highly aristocratic and fiercely proud of her heritage. She is introduced early in the first Barsoom novel, A Princess of Mars, and is the love interest of John Carter. She is a central character in the first three novels, and her capture by various enemies, and subsequent pursuit by John Carter, is a constant motivating force in these tales. She is a minor character in The Chessmen of Mars and John Carter of Mars.
- Tars Tarkas: A Green Martian warrior unusually compassionate among his people, who befriends John Carter and fights many battles at his side. Carter helps him become Jeddak of his society and negotiates an alliance between them and the city-state of Helium, which results in the destruction of their enemies, the city of Zodanga, at the end of A Princess of Mars; but Tars Tarkas retains much of his earlier personality.
- Thuvia of Ptarth: A Princess of Ptarth, who first appears in The Gods of Mars, as a slave girl, rescued by John Carter from the nefarious Therns, and later imprisoned with Carter's wife Dejah Thoris, in a prison which can only be opened once per year and remains by her side until the conclusion of The Warlord of Mars. Like many of Burroughs' Martian heroines, she is tough, courageous, and proud, and identifies strongly with her aristocratic position in Martian society. Also typically, she is abducted by evildoers who wish to use her for political gain in Thuvia, Maid of Mars, her rescue providing primary motivation for the plot of that novel. She is a central character in Thuvia, Maid of Mars and love interest of John Carter and Dejah Thoris' son Carthoris.
- Ras Thavas: A mad scientist who develops both brain-transplant techniques and a form of cloning; a principal character in both The Master Mind of Mars and Synthetic Men of Mars.
- Tan Hadron: A young Red Martian navy officer and the central character of A Fighting Man of Mars.
- Vor Daj: A soldier in John Carter's guard. Principal character in Synthetic Men of Mars, who spends much of the novel with his brain transplanted into a hideous but powerful synthetic body.
- Gahan of Gathol: A prince of Gathol; love interest for Tara of Helium and father of Llana of Gathol; a principal character in The Chessmen of Mars.

=== Martian descendants of John Carter and Dejah Thoris ===
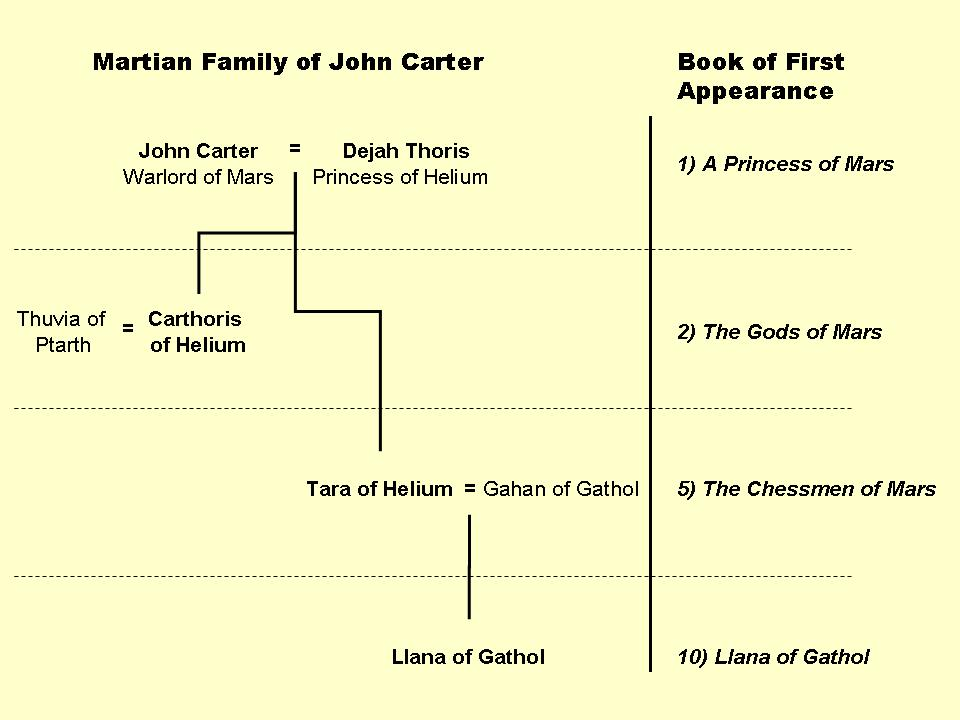
John Carter's descendants

- Carthoris: Son of John Carter and Dejah Thoris, who inherits his father's superior strength. A minor character in The Gods of Mars. A principal character in Thuvia, Maid of Mars and love interest of Thuvia.
- Tara of Helium: Impetuous daughter of John Carter and Dejah Thoris, who runs away and gets involved in various perilous situations as a principal character in The Chessmen of Mars. Love interest of Gahan of Gathol and mother of Llana of Gathol.
- Llana of Gathol: Granddaughter of John Carter and Dejah Thoris and daughter of Tara of Helium and Gahan of Gathol; a principal character in the stories collected in Llana of Gathol.

== Environment ==
While Burroughs' Barsoom tales never aspired to anything other than escapism, his vision of Mars was loosely inspired by astronomical speculation of the time, especially that of Percival Lowell, that saw the planet as a formerly Earthlike world now becoming less hospitable to life due to its advanced age. Living on an aging planet, with dwindling resources, the inhabitants of Barsoom have become hardened and warlike, fighting one another to survive. Once a wet world with continents and oceans, Barsoom's seas gradually dried up, leaving it a dry planet of highlands interspersed with moss-covered dead sea bottoms. Abandoned cities line the former coasts. The last remnants of the former bodies of water are the Great Toonolian Marshes and the antarctic Lost Sea of Korus.

Barsoomians distribute their scarce water supplies via a worldwide system of canals, controlled by quarreling city-states at the junctures thereof. The idea of Martian "canals" stems from telescopic observations by 19th century astronomers who, beginning with Giovanni Schiaparelli in 1877, believed they saw networks of lines on the planet. Schiaparelli called them canali, meaning "channels" but mistranslated in English as "canals". During the time Burroughs wrote his first Barsoom stories, the theory was put forward by a number of prominent scientists, notably Lowell, that these were huge engineering works constructed by an intelligent race. This view, though utterly false as is now known, inspired much science fiction. The thinning Barsoomian atmosphere is artificially replenished by an "atmosphere plant" on whose function all life on the planet is dependent.

The Martian year comprises 687 Martian days, each of which is 24 hours and 37 minutes long. (Burroughs presumably derived this from the figures published by Lowell, but erroneously substituted the number of 24-hour Earth days in the Martian year, rather than the number of 24.6-hour Martian days, which is only 669.) The days are hot (again known to be false) and the nights are cold, and there appears to be little variation in climate across the planet except at the poles.

Burroughs explained his ideas about the Martian environment in an article "A Dispatch on Mars" published in the London Daily Express in 1926. He assumed that Mars was formerly identical to the Earth; therefore a similar evolutionary development of fauna would have taken place. He referenced winds, snows, and marshes supposedly observed by astronomers, as evidence of an atmosphere, and that the wastes of the planet had been irrigated (probably referencing Lowell's "canals"), which suggested that an advanced civilization existed on the planet.

== Races and culture ==
All Barsoomian races resemble Homo sapiens in most respects, except for being oviparous and having lifespans in excess of 1,000 years (though actual life expectancy is far shorter.) However, the Green Martians are much taller, have four arms, tusks, and antennae like ears. The traditional Martian lifespan of 1,000 is based on the customary pilgrimage down the River Iss, which is taken by virtually all Martians by that age, or those who feel tired of their long lives and expect to find a paradise at the end of their journey. None return from this pilgrimage, because it leads to almost certain death at the hands of ferocious creatures.

While the Martian females are egg-laying, Martians have inexplicably mammalian characteristics such as a navel and breasts. While they have skins of various colors, and their bodies differ in some cases from traditional humans, they are very similar to varieties of Earth humans and there is little examination of difference. There is only one spoken language across the entire planet, but a variety of writing systems.

All Martians are telepathic among one another, and also with domestic animals. Other telepathic abilities are demonstrated across the books. The Lotharians in Thuvia, Maid of Mars, are able to project images of warfare that can kill by suggestion. In The Warlord of Mars, the nations are described as bellicose and self-sufficient; but in The Gods of Mars inter-city state merchants are mentioned, and in Thuvia, Maid of Mars, towering staging posts for inter-city liners are also described.

Most of the cultures are dynasties or theocracies.

=== Red Martians ===
The Red Martians are the dominant culture on Barsoom. They are organized into a system of imperial city-states including Helium, Ptarth, and Zodanga, controlling the planetary canal system, as well as other more-isolated city-states in the hinterlands. These Martians are the interbred descendants of the ancient Yellow Martians, White Martians and Black Martians, remnants of which exist in isolated areas of the planet, particularly the poles. In A Princess of Mars, it is said that the Red Martians were bred when the seas of Barsoom began to dry up, in hopes of creating a hardy race to survive in the new environment.

They are, like all the humanoid races of Mars, oviparous, i.e., their newborn hatch from eggs.

The Red Martians adhere to a specific code of honor, which includes respect the idea of private property and a generalized a sense of fairness. Their culture is governed by law and is technologically advanced. They are capable of love and have families.

=== Green Martians ===
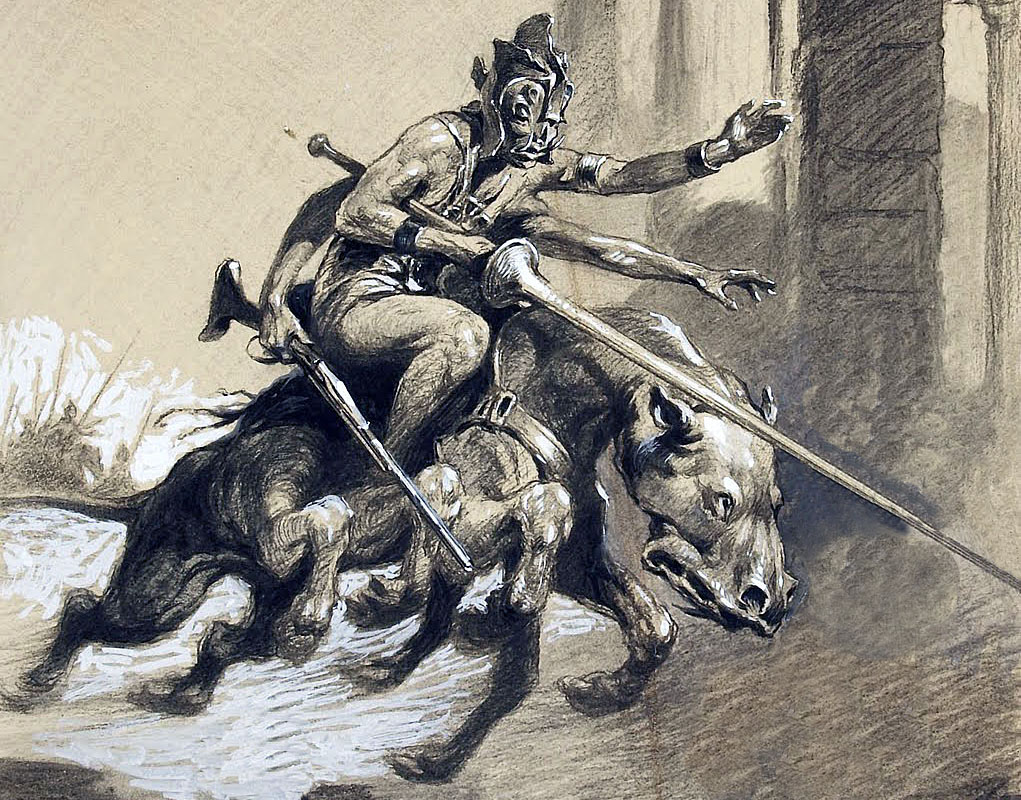
A four armed Green Martian on his thoat, as represented in the original 1920 edition of Thuvia, Maid of Mars

The Green Martians are 15 feet (4.6 m) tall (males) and 12 feet (3.7 m) tall (females), have two arms, two legs and two intermediary limbs that can be used as either arms or legs at will. Their eyes are mounted at the side of their heads and can move independently of each other in order to see in two directions at once. They are nomadic, warlike and barbaric, do not form families, have little concept of friendship or love and enjoy inflicting torture upon their victims. Their social structure is highly communal and rigidly hierarchical, consisting of various levels of chiefs, with the highest office of Jeddak obtained by mortal combat.

The Green Men are primitive, intellectually unadvanced, do not have any kind of art and are without a written language. While they manufacture edged weapons, any advanced technology they possess, such as 'radium pistols', is stolen from raids upon the Red Martians. They inhabit the ancient ruined cities left behind by civilizations which lived on Barsoom during a more advanced and hospitable era in the planet's history. They apparently arose from a biological experiment which went awry and as with all other Martians, they are an egg-laying species, concealing their eggs in incubators until hatching. Tars Tarkas, who befriends John Carter when he first arrives on Barsoom, is an unusual exception from the typical ruthless Green Martian, due to having known the love of his own mate and daughter.

In the novels, the Green Martians are often referred to by the names of their hordes, which in turn take their names from the abandoned cities they inhabit. Thus the followers of Tars Tarkas, based in the ruined ancient city of Thark, are known as "Tharks". Other hordes bear the names of Warhoon, Torquas, and Thurd.

=== Yellow Martians ===
==== Okarians ====
Yellow Martians are supposedly extinct, but in The Warlord of Mars they are found hiding in secret domed cities at the North Pole of Mars. At the time John Carter arrives on Barsoom, the Yellow Race is known only in old wives' tales and campfire stories.

The only means of entrance to the Okarians' city is through The Carrion Caves, which are every bit as unpleasant as the name suggests. Air travel over the barrier is discouraged through the use of a great magnetic pillar called "The Guardian of the North," which draws fliers of all sizes inexorably to their doom as they collide with the massive structure.

Their cities are domed hothouses which keep out the cold, but outdoors they favor orluk furs and boots. Physically they are large and strong, and the men usually wear bristling black beards.

=== White Martians ===
==== Orovars ====
The White Martians, known as 'Orovars', were rulers of Mars for 500,000 years, with an empire of sophisticated cities with advanced technology. They were white-skinned, with blond or auburn hair. They were once a seafaring race, but when the oceans began to dry up they began to cooperate with the Yellow and Black Martians to breed the Red Martians, foreseeing the need for hardy stock to cope with the emerging harsher environment. They became decadent and 'overcivilized'. At the beginning of the series they are believed to be extinct, but three remaining populations - the Orovars, Therns and Lotharians – are still living in secret and are discovered as the books progress.

==== Lotharians ====
The Lotharians are a remnant population of the original White Martians, which appear only in Thuvia, Maid of Mars. There are only 1000 of them remaining, all of them male. They are skilled in telepathy, able to project images that can kill, or provide sustenance. They live a reclusive existence in a remote area of Barsoom, debating philosophy amongst themselves.

==== Therns ====
Descendants of the original White Martians who live in a complex of caves and passages in the cliffs above the Valley Dor. This is the destination of the River Iss, on whose currents most Martians eventually travel, on a pilgrimage seeking final paradise, once tired of life or reaching 1000 years of age. The valley is actually populated by monsters who, overseen by Therns, attack all who enter the valley, killing and exsanguinating them for the Therns to cannibalize, only excepting those whom the directing Therns choose instead to enslave. They consider themselves a unique creation, different from other Martians. They maintain the Martian religion through a network of collaborators and spies across the planet. When they reach the age of 1000 years they make a pilgrimage to the Temple of Issus, unaware that they have been manipulated into doing so in order to be slaughtered by the Black Men of Mars in an analogous deception to that the Therns practice on other Martians. They are also the repeated target of raids by the Black Martians to capture their females as slaves. They are white-skinned (of a skin tone close enough to human Caucasians that John Carter was able to easily pose as one) and the males are bald but wear blond wigs.

=== Black Martians (First Born) ===
Legend suggests that the Black Martians are inhabitants of one of the moons of Mars, when in fact they live in an underground stronghold near the south pole of the planet, around the submartian Sea of Omean, below the Lost Sea of Korus, where they keep a large aerial navy. They call themselves the 'First-Born', believing themselves to be a unique creation among Martian races, and worship Issus, a woman who styles herself as the God of the Martian religion but is no such thing. They frequently raid the White Martian Therns, who maintain the false Martian religion, carrying off people as slaves. John Carter defeats their navy in The Gods of Mars.

=== Others ===
==== Kaldanes and Rykors ====
The Chessmen of Mars introduces the Kaldanes of the region Bantoom, whose form is almost all head but for six spiderlike legs and a pair of chelae, and whose racial goal is to evolve even further towards pure intellect and away from bodily existence. In order to function in the physical realm, they have bred the Rykors, a complementary species composed of a body similar to that of a perfect specimen of Red Martian but lacking a head; when the Kaldane places itself upon the shoulders of the Rykor, a bundle of tentacles connects with the Rykor's spinal cord, allowing the brain of the Kaldane to interface with the body of the Rykor. Should the Rykor become damaged or die, the Kaldane merely climbs upon another as an earthling might change a horse.

==== Kangaroo Men ====
A lesser people of Barsoom are the Kangaroo Men of Gooli, so called due to their large, kangaroo-like tails, ability to hop large distances and the rearing of their eggs in pouches. They are presented as a race of boastful, cowardly individuals. Their moral character is not highly developed; they are devout cowards and petty thieves, who value (aside from their lives) only a "treasure" consisting of pretty stones, sea shells, etc.

==== Hormads ====
In addition to the naturally occurring races of Barsoom, Burroughs described the Hormads, artificial men created by the scientist Ras Thavas as slaves, workers, warriors, etc. in giant vats at his laboratory in the Toonolian Marsh in Synthetic Men of Mars and "John Carter and the Giant of Mars". Although the Hormads were generally recognizable as humanoid, the process was far from perfect, and generated monstrosities ranging from the occasional misplaced nose or eyeball to "a great mass of living flesh with an eye somewhere and a single hand."

== Technology ==
When Burroughs wrote the first volume of the Barsoom series, aviation and radio technology was in its infancy and radioactivity was a fledgling science. Despite this, the series includes a range of technological developments including radium munitions, battles between fleets of aircraft, devices similar to faxes and televisions, genetic manipulation, elements of terraforming and other ideas. One notable device mentioned is the "directional compass"; this may be believed to be the precursor to the now-common "global positioning system", or GPS for short.

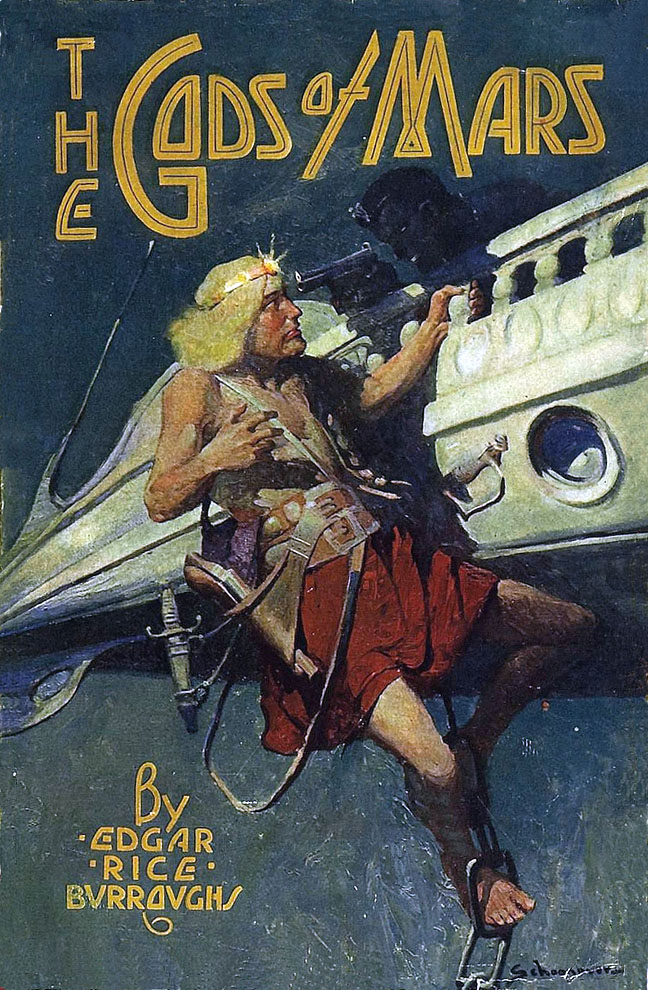
Martian flier on cover of The Gods of Mars

=== Fliers ===
The Red Martians have flying machines, both civilian transports and fleets of heavily armed war craft. These stay aloft through some form of anti-gravity, which Burroughs explains as relating to the rays of the Sun. Fliers travel at approximately 166.1 miles per hour (267.3 km/h) (450 Martian Haads per hour).

In Thuvia, Maid of Mars, John Carter's son Carthoris invents what appears to be a partial precursor of the autopilot (several decades before it became a reality). The device, built upon existing Martian compass technology, allows the pilot to reach any programmed destination, having only to keep the craft pointed in the set direction. Upon arrival, the device automatically lowers the craft to the surface. He also includes a kind of collision detector, which uses radium rays to detect any obstacle and automatically steer the craft elsewhere until the obstacle is no longer detected. This device works in principle almost identically to the backscatter radiation detector used to fire the braking rockets on the Soyuz space capsule. In Swords of Mars a flier with some kind of mechanical brain is introduced. Controlled by thought, it can be remote-controlled in flight, or instructed to travel to any destination.

=== Weapons ===
Firearms are common, and use 'Radium' bullets, which explode when exposed to sunlight. Some weapons are specific to races or inventors. The mysterious Yellow Martians, who live in secret glass-domed cities at the poles and appear in The Warlord of Mars, have a form of magnet which allows them to attract flying craft and cause them to crash. Scientist Phor Tak, who appears in A Fighting Man of Mars, has developed a disintegrator ray, and also a paste which renders vehicles such as fliers impervious to its effects. He also develops a missile which seeks out craft protected in this fashion, and a means of rendering fliers invisible which becomes a key plot device in the novel. However, while advanced weapons are available, most Martians seem to prefer melee combat — mostly with swords — and their level of skill is highly impressive. Warriors often are armed with four weapons (in descending order, pistol, long-sword, short sword and dagger) and it is considered unchivalrous to defend with any weapon but the one used in an attack (or a lesser one.) While technically it would be easy to use firearms to kill an opponent armed with a sword, such conduct is socially unacceptable and (except for one abortive attempt by the assassin Uldak in Swords of Mars) even the villains in Barsoom books never resort to it.

=== Atmosphere plant ===
There are many technological wonders in the novels, some colossal works of engineering. The failing air of the dying planet is maintained by an atmosphere plant, and the restoration of this is a plot component of A Princess of Mars. It is described as being 4 miles (6 km) across with walls 100 feet (30 m) in depth, and telepathically operated entrance doors of 20-foot-thick (6.1 m) steel.

=== Medicine and biology ===
Martian medicine is generally greatly in advance of that on Earth. Various "ointments" and "salves," particularly as ascribed to the Green Martian women, are capable of healing all but instantly deadly wounds in a matter of hours—as first seen in A Princess of Mars. In The Master Mind of Mars aging genius Ras Thavas has perfected the means of transplanting organs, limbs and brains, which during his experiments he swaps between animals and humanoids, men and women and young and old. Later, in Synthetic Men of Mars, he discovers the secret of life, and creates an army of artificial servants and warriors grown in giant vats filled with organic tissue. They frequently emerge deformed, are volatile and are difficult to control, later threatening to take over the planet.

=== Clothing ===
The Martians wear no clothing other than jewelry and leather harnesses, which are designed to hold everything from the weaponry of a warrior to pouches containing toiletries and other useful items; the only instances where Barsoomians habitually wear clothing is for need of warmth, such as for travel in the northern polar regions described in The Warlord of Mars.

This preference for near-nudity provides a stimulating subject for illustrators of the stories, though art for many mass-market editions of the books feature Carter and native Barsoomians wearing loincloths and other minimal coverings, or use strategically placed shadows and such to cover genitalia and female breasts.

== Fauna ==
It appears that most of Burrough's Martian creatures are roughly equivalent to those found on Earth, though most seem to have multiple legs (usually a total of six limbs, but sometimes as many as ten) and all are egg-laying.

=== "Insects", "reptiles" and "birds" ===
- Sith: A giant, venomous hornet-like insect endemic to the Kaolian Forest.
- Reptiles: Are described as repulsive and usually poisonous, and include
  - Darseen, a chameleon-like reptile.
  - Silian, an Antarctic sea-monster found in the Lost Sea of Korus.
- Birds: Burroughs tells us that Martian birds are brilliantly plumed, but the only species actually described is the enormous Malagor, native to the Great Toonolian Marshes.

=== "Mammals" ===
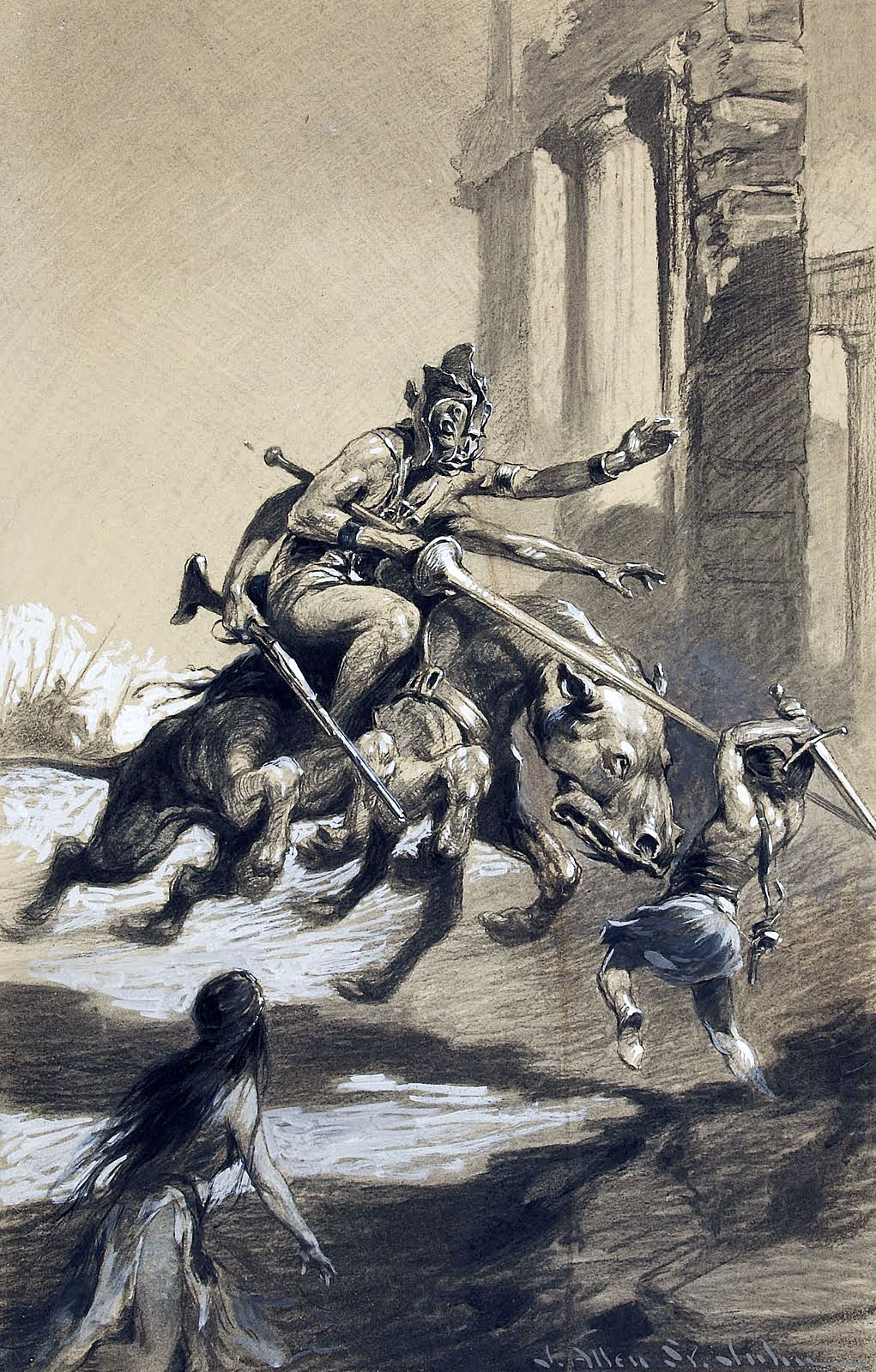
Green Martian riding a thoat, as illustrated by J. Allen St. John in first edition of Thuvia, Maid of Mars

The martian mammalian equivalents all have fur, and both domestic and wild varieties are described by Burroughs.

==== Domesticated ====
- Sorak: A small six-legged creature, equivalent to a cat.
- Calot: A large dog-like creature with a frog-like mouth (making them look like cynodonts), and three rows of teeth and ten short legs. John Carter has his own calot, named Woola, who is his faithful companion during most of A Princess of Mars and The Warlord of Mars.
- Thoat: A Martian horse. It has four legs on each side of its body and a wide, flat tail, which is wider at the apex than at the base and which is extended while running. The Greater Thoat is used as a mount by the Green Martians and stands about 10 feet (3.0 m) high at the shoulder; the Lesser Thoat bred by the Red Martians is closer to Earth horses in size. The Thoat is described as a slate-colored animal, with a white underside and yellow lower legs and feet.
- Zitidar: A draft animal, described as being similar to mastodons.

==== Wild ====
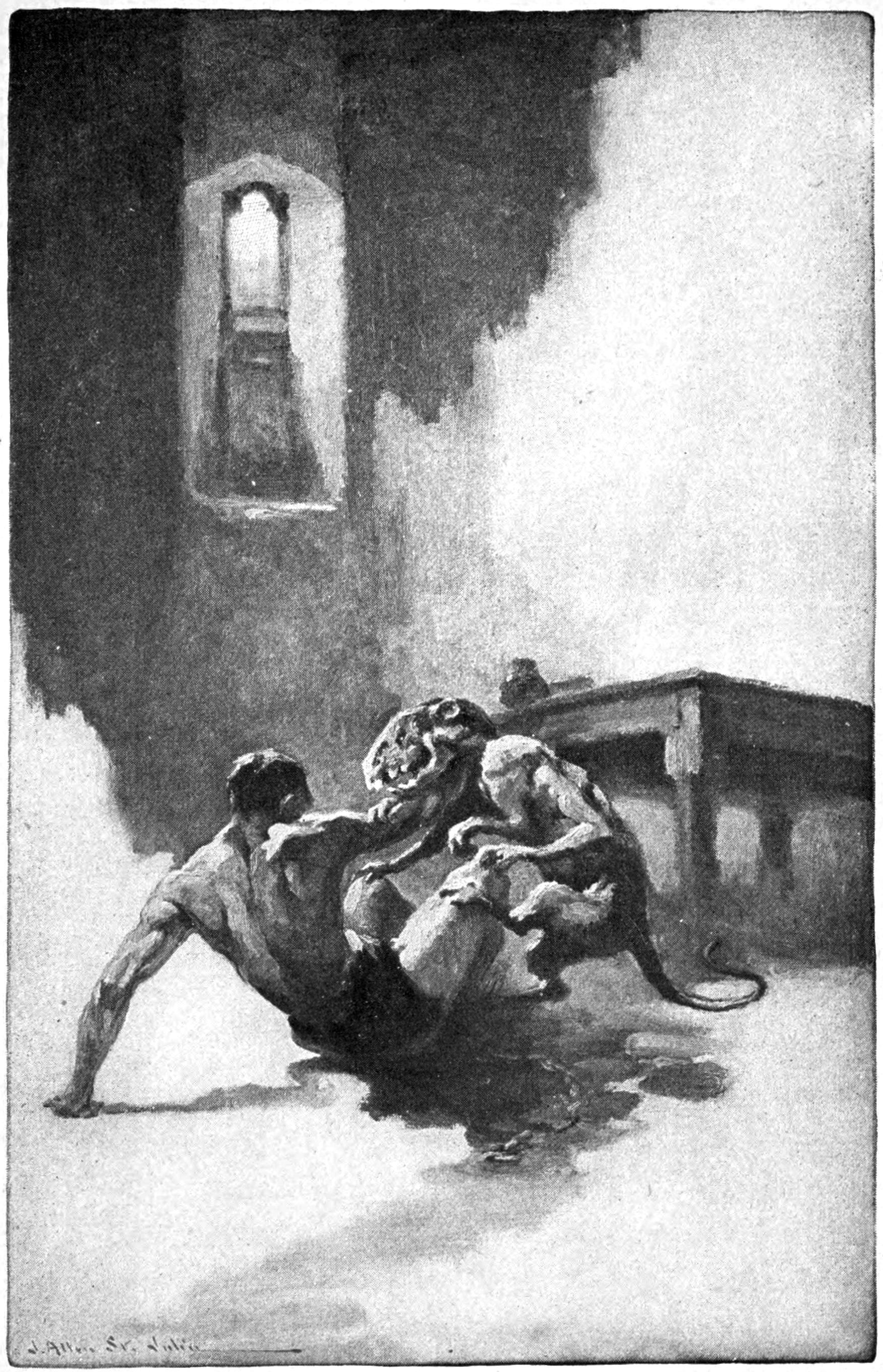
Ulsio as illustrated by J. Allen St. John in first edition of Chessmen of Mars

- Apt: A large white-furred arctic creature with six limbs, four being legs, which give it rapid speed, and two being arms with hairless hands, with which it grasps prey. It has tusks growing from its lower jawbone, and large faceted, insect-like eyes. Appears in The Warlord of Mars.
- Banth: A Barsoomian "lion". It hunts the hills surrounding the dead seas of Barsoom. It has a long, sleek body, with ten legs, and large jaws equipped with several rows of sharp fangs in a mouth which extends back almost to its small ears. It is mostly hairless, except for a thick mane around the neck. It has large, protruding green eyes.
- Ulsio: A kind of Barsoomian "rat", described as a dog-sized burrower.
- White Ape: Huge and ferocious, semi-intelligent gorilla-like creatures with an extra set of arms, which first appear in A Princess of Mars.

==== Other ====
- Rykors are headless but otherwise human-like creatures bred by the Kaldanes, appearing only in The Chessmen of Mars.
- Plant Men: Monsters found in the Valley Dor. They are between 10 and 12 feet (3.0 and 3.7 m) in height when upright, with hairless bodies similar in form to humans, excepting broad flat feet which are 3 feet (0.9 m) in length and a 6-foot (1.8 m) tail, which tapers from a round profile to a flat blade shape at the tip. They also have short, sinuous arms similar to elephant trunks, ending with taloned hands with mouths set in the palms. It also attacks and feeds upon Martian Pilgrims, who travel to the Valley Dor expecting to find final paradise. Their faces are without mouths, with a nose like an open wound, a single white eye surrounded by a white band, and black hair 10 to 12 inches long, each strand similar in thickness to an earthworm. They appear in The Gods of Mars. The Plant Men have a mouth in the palm of each hand, with which they feed on tender vegetation (which they shear with their razor-sharp talons) or on the blood of their victims. After "the defiling blood of life has been drawn" from a human by the Plant Men, the flesh may be eaten by the Holy Therns, another Barsoomian race.
- Orluk: An Arctic predator with a black and yellow striped coat, whose legs are not described.

== Themes ==
=== American frontier ===
Barsoom might be seen as a kind of Martian Wild West. John Carter is himself an adventuring frontiersman. When he arrives on Barsoom he first compares it to the landscape of Arizona which he has left behind. He discovers a savage, frontier world where the civilized Red Martians are kept invigorated as a race by repelling the constant attacks of the Green Martians, a possible equivalent of Wild West ideals. Indeed, the Green Martians are a barbaric, nomadic, tribal culture with many parallels to stereotypes of American Indians. The desire to return to the frontier became common in the early 20th century America. As the United States become more urbanized, the world of the 19th century frontier America became romanticized as a lost world of freedom and noble qualities.

=== Race ===
Race is a constant theme in the Barsoom novels and the world is clearly divided along racial lines. Red, Green, White, Black, and Yellow races all appear across the novels, each with particular traits and qualities which seem to define the characters of the individuals. In this respect, Burroughs' concept of race, as depicted in the novels, is more like a division between species. The Red and Green Martians are almost complete opposites of one another, with the Red Martians being civilized, lawful, capable of love and forming families, and the Green Martians being savage, cruel, tribal and without families or the ability to form romantic relationships. Yet, friendship between individuals of different nations and races is a frequent topic driving the stories.

=== Religious deception ===
The Barsoom series features a number of incidents of religious deception, or the use of superstition by those in power to control and manipulate others. Burroughs is particularly concerned about the hypocrisy of religious leaders. This is first established in A Princess of Mars, but becomes particularly apparent in the sequel, The Gods of Mars. Upon reaching 1,000 years of age almost all Martians undertake a pilgrimage on the River Iss, expecting to find a valley of mystical paradise; what they find is in fact a deathtrap, populated by ferocious creatures and overseen by a race of cruel, cannibal priests known as Therns, who perpetuate the Martian religion through a network of spies across the planet.

John Carter's battle to track down the remnants of the Therns and their masters continues in the sequel, The Warlord of Mars. More deceitful priests in a nation controlled by such appear in The Master Mind of Mars, on this occasion manipulating a temple idol to control followers.

Burroughs continued this theme in his many Tarzan novels. Burroughs was not anti-religious; however, he was concerned about followers placing their trust in religions and being abused and exploited, and saw this as a common feature of organized religion.

=== Excessive intellectualism ===
While Burroughs is generally seen as a writer who produced work of limited philosophical sophistication, he wrote two Barsoom novels which appear to explore or parody the limits of excessive intellectual development at the expense of bodily or physical existence. The first was Thuvia, Maid of Mars, in which Thuvia and Carthoris discover a remnant of ancient White Martian civilization, the Lotharians. The Lotharians have mostly died out, but maintain the illusion of a functioning society through powerful telepathic projections. They have formed two factions which appear to portray the excesses of pointless intellectual debate. One faction, the realists, believes in imagining meals to provide sustenance; another, the etherealists, believes in surviving without eating.

The Chessmen of Mars is the second example of this trend. The Kaldanes have sacrificed their bodies to become pure brain, but although they can interface with Rykor bodies, their ability to function, compared with normal people of integrated mind and body, is ineffectual and clumsy. The Kaldanes, though highly intelligent, are ugly, ineffectual creatures when not interfaced with a Rykor body. Tara of Helium compares them to effete intellectuals from her home city, with a self-important sense of superiority; and Gahan of Gathol muses that it might be better to find a balance between the intellect and bodily passions.

=== Paradox of "Superiority" ===
Some of Barsoom's people, especially the Therns and First-Born, hold themselves as "superior" to the "lesser order" people on Barsoom. A paradox is established in that the Therns and First-Born, though they hold themselves in such high esteem, nonetheless are dependent on these lesser orders for their sustenance, labor, and goods. The Therns and First-Born are "non-productive" people and do not produce anything or invent, as such labor is seen as beneath them. This is punctuated by the fact that the Therns and First-Born are obliged to create strongholds in the south polar regions, to insulate themselves from the remainder of the planet dominated primarily by red and green Martians. A particular ironic twist is introduced by the fact that the white Therns think that they control and manipulate the entire planet, when they are in turn unknowingly exploited by the black First-Born.

== Antecedents and influences on Burroughs ==
=== Scientific inspiration ===
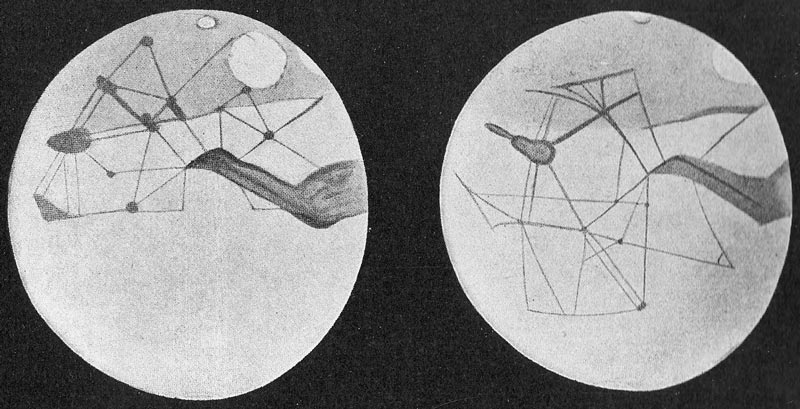
Martian canals depicted by Percival Lowell

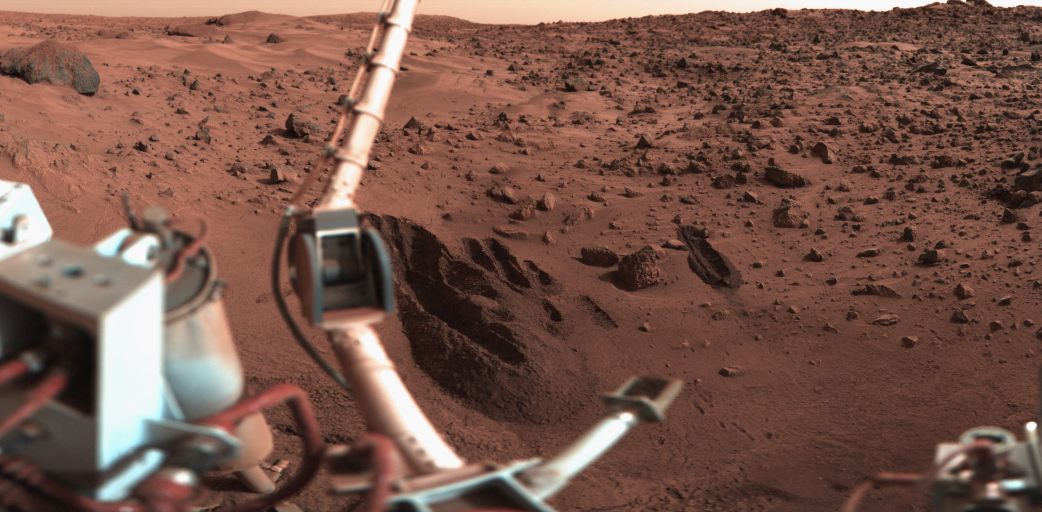
The arid, lifeless surface of Mars as seen by the Viking Probe

Burroughs' concept of a dying Mars and the Martian canals follows the theories of Lowell and his predecessor Giovanni Schiaparelli. In 1878, Italian astronomer Giovanni Virginio Schiaparelli observed geological features on Mars which he called canali (Italian: "channels"). This was mistranslated into the English as "canals" which, being artificial watercourses, fueled the belief that there was some sort of intelligent extraterrestrial life on the planet. This further influenced American astronomer Percival Lowell.

In 1895 Lowell published a book titled Mars which speculated about an arid, dying landscape, whose inhabitants had been forced to build canals thousands of miles long to bring water from the polar caps (now known to be mostly frozen carbon dioxide or "dry ice") to irrigate the remaining arable land. Lowell followed with Mars and Its Canals (1906) and Mars as an Abode of Life (1908). These books formed prominent scientific ideas about the conditions on the red planet in the early years of the 20th century. Burroughs does not seem to have based his vision of Mars on precise reading of Lowell's theories, however, as a number of errors in his books suggest he got most of his information from newspaper articles and other popular accounts of Lowell's Mars.

The concept of canals with flowing water and a world where life was possible were later proved erroneous by more accurate observation of the planet. Later landings by American probes such as the two Viking missions found a dead world too cold (and with far too thin an atmosphere) for water to exist in its fluid state.

=== Previous Mars fiction ===
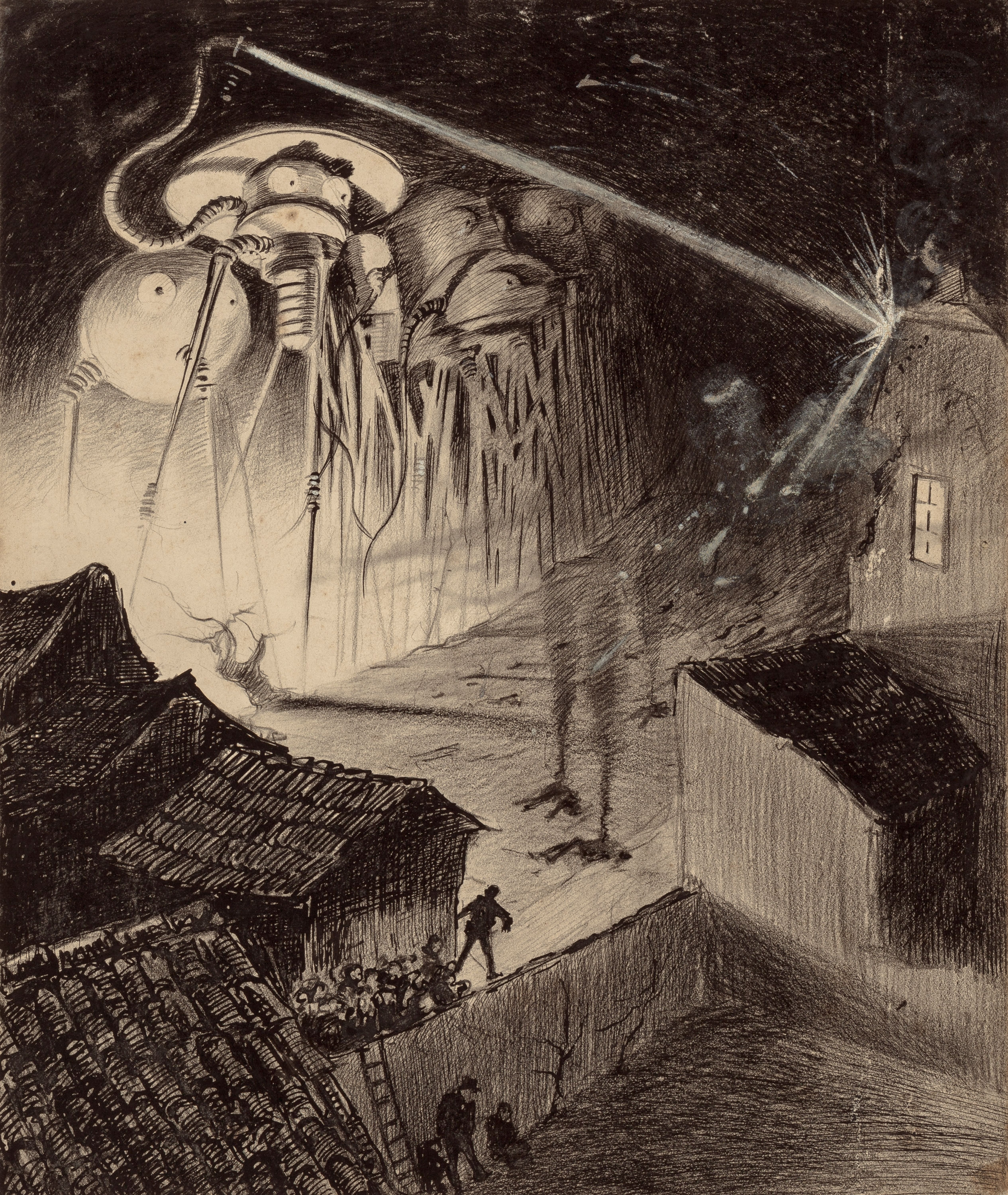
Martians, escaping a dying Mars, invade Earth in The War of the Worlds.

The first science fiction to be set on Mars may be Across the Zodiac, by Percy Greg, published in 1880, which concerned a civil war on Mars. Another Mars novel, dealing with benevolent Martians coming to Earth was published in 1897 by Kurd Lasswitz, Auf Zwei Planeten. It was not translated until 1971, and was thus unlikely to have influenced Burroughs, although it did depict a Mars influenced by the ideas of Percival Lowell. Other examples are Mr. Stranger's Sealed Packet (1889), which took place on Mars; Gustavus W. Popes's Journey to Mars (1894); and Ellsworth Douglas's Pharaoh's Broker, in which the protagonist encounters an Egyptian civilization on Mars which, while parallel to that of the Earth, has evolved somehow independently.

H.G. Wells' novel, The War of the Worlds, most definitely influenced by Lowell and published in 1898, did however create the precedent for a number of enduring Martian tropes in science fiction writing. These include Mars being an ancient world, nearing the end of its life; being the home of a superior civilization, capable of advanced feats of science and engineering; and a source of invasion forces, keen to conquer the Earth. The first two tropes were prominent in Burroughs' Barsoom series. Burroughs, however, claimed never to have read any of H.G. Wells' books. Lowell was probably the greater direct influence on Burroughs.

Richard A. Lupoff claimed that Burroughs was influenced in writing his Martian stories by Edwin Lester Arnold's earlier novel Lieut. Gullivar Jones: His Vacation (1905) (later retitled Gulliver of Mars). Gullivar Jones, who travels to Mars by flying carpet rather than via astral projection, encounters a civilization with similarities to those found on Barsoom, rescues a Martian Princess, and even undertakes a voyage down a river similar to the Iss in The Gods of Mars. Lupoff also suggested that Burroughs derived characteristics of his main protagonist John Carter from Phra, hero of Arnold's The Wonderful Adventures of Phra the Phoenician (1890), who is also a swashbuckling adventurer and master swordsman for whom death is no obstacle. Lupoff's theories were disputed by numerous scholars of Burroughs' work; Lupoff countered, claiming that many of Burroughs' stories had antecedents in previous works and that this was not unusual for writers.

== Burroughs' influence ==
=== Public figures ===
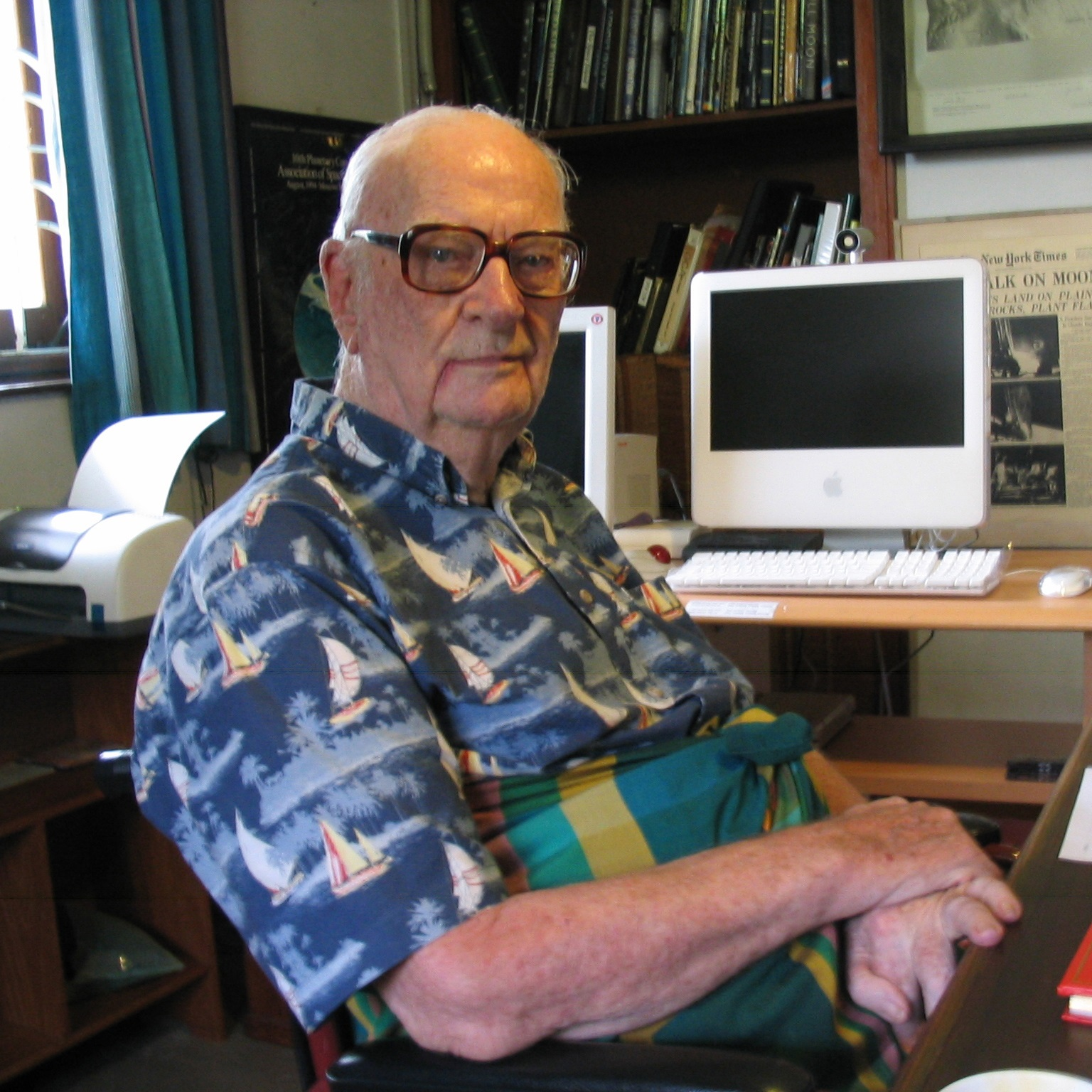
SF writer Arthur C. Clarke was inspired by Barsoom.

Notable fans of the Barsoom series include Carl Sagan, Terry Wilcutt, Jane Goodall, Michael Crichton, Arthur C. Clarke, and Ronald Reagan. Author Edmund Morris wrote in his biography Dutch: A Memoir of Ronald Reagan that A Princess of Mars was Reagan's favorite childhood novel.

Scientist Carl Sagan read the books as a young boy, and they continued to affect his imagination into his adult years. Sagan remembered Barsoom as a "world of ruined cities, planet-girdling canals, immense pumping stations – a feudal technological society". For two decades, a map of the planet as imagined by Burroughs, hung in the hallway outside Sagan's office in Cornell University. The author so influenced real exploration of Mars that an impact crater was named after him.

Early science-fiction writers Ray Bradbury and Arthur C. Clarke were both inspired by the Barsoom books in their youth, with them serving as an inspiration for Bradbury's The Martian Chronicles (1950), in which he used the concept of a dying Mars. Writer Robert A. Heinlein also wrote fiction inspired by Burroughs' Barsoom series, and for many others the Barsoom series helped to establish Mars as an adventurous, enticing destination for the imagination.

==== Games ====
The Warriors of Mars rules for miniature warfare by Gary Gygax and Brian Blume were controversial, and a legal dispute with the owners of the rights to the Barsoom series led to withdrawal of this title from the market.

==== Novels and short stories ====
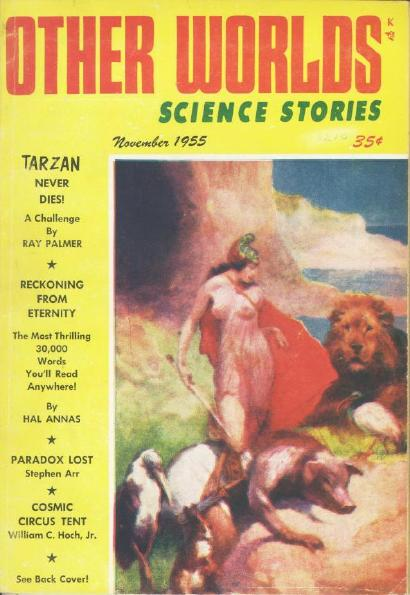
Other Worlds, November 1955, art by J. Allen St. John

Numerous novels and series by others were inspired by Burroughs' Mars books: the Radio Planet trilogy of Ralph Milne Farley; the Mars and Venus novels of Otis Adelbert Kline; Almuric by Robert E. Howard; Warrior of Llarn and Thief of Llarn by Gardner Fox; the Michael Kane trilogy of Michael Moorcock; The Dream-Quest of Unknown Kadath, Through the Gates of the Silver Key by H. P. Lovecraft, the Gor series of John Norman; the Callisto series and Green Star series of Lin Carter; The Goddess of Ganymede and Pursuit on Ganymede by Mike Resnick; and the Dray Prescot series of Alan Burt Akers (Kenneth Bulmer). In addition, Leigh Brackett, Ray Bradbury, Andre Norton, Marion Zimmer Bradley, and Alan Dean Foster show Burroughs' influence in their development of alien cultures and worlds.

In 1955, under the pseudonym John Bloodstone, writer Stuart J. Byrne wrote the novel Tarzan on Mars, with Tarzan going to Barsoom called Tarzan on Mars via an editorial called "Tarzan Never Dies", by editor Ray Palmer, in Other Worlds Science Stories magazine. The novel could not be published because Palmer was unable to get authorization from the estate of Edgar Rice Burroughs.

Robert A. Heinlein's novels Glory Road and The Number of the Beast, and Alan Moore's graphic novels of Allan and the Sundered Veil and The League of Extraordinary Gentlemen, Volume II directly reference Barsoom.

L. Sprague de Camp's story "Sir Harold of Zodanga" recasts and rationalizes Barsoom as a parallel world visited by his dimension-hopping hero Harold Shea.

In 1989 Larry Niven and Steven Barnes published "The Barsoom Project", the second in the "Dream Park" series, where a Martian terraforming and colonization project is named after the Barsoom books.

The 2008 novel In the Courts of the Crimson Kings by S.F. writer S. M. Stirling is an alternate telling of the Princess of Mars story.

"Mars: The Home Front", a short story by George Alec Effinger, published in War of the Worlds: Global Dispatches, is a crossover between the Barsoom series and H. G. Wells' The War of the Worlds.

In the first chapters of Gore Vidal's novel Washington, D.C., the character Peter Sanford – sixteen at the outset of the plot – indulges in vivid and detailed fantasies of being John Carter, and adds explicit erotic scenes not appearing in the original Burroughs books.

In Karl Schroeder's novel Lockstep, set over 14,000 years in the future, Mars has been terraformed and is renamed Barsoom.

==== Poetry ====
The Dead City of Korad was published in 1964 and marks the beginning of the science fiction genre in Cuba.

==== Film and television ====
- Avatar: In interviews, James Cameron has invoked Burroughs as one of the primary inspirations behind his 2009 space adventure.

== Adaptations ==
=== Comic strips ===
==== John Carter of Mars (1941–1943) ====
With the Tarzan comic strip a popular success, newspapers began a comic strip adaptation of A Princess of Mars drawn by Edgar Rice Burroughs' son, John Coleman Burroughs. Never as popular as Tarzan, the strip ran in only four Sunday newspapers, from December 7, 1941, to March 28, 1943, for a total of 73 installments.

==== The Martian (1958–1959) ====
Fifteen years later, the British tabloid paper Sunday Sun ran a newspaper strip also based on the first Barsoom novel titled The Martian. This adaptation was written by D. R. Morton and drawn by Robert Forest, the strip ran as a weekly serial from October 25, 1958, to May 23, 1959, for a total of 31 installments.

==== Tarzan (1994–1995) ====
From October 16, 1994, to August 13, 1995, writer Don Kraar and artist Gray Morrow set an arc first in Pellucidar and then on Barsoom featuring Tarzan, David Innes, and John Carter in a crossover adventure through their respective worlds. This storyline was the last Sunday strip installment to feature Carter, Barsoom and the worlds outside of Tarzan.

=== Comic books ===
- The Funnies (Dell Comics): This comics anthology included a John Carter of Mars serial drawn by John Coleman Burroughs, which ran for 23 installments through issues #30–56 (April 1939 – June 1941) respectively; a story was apparently intended for issue 57 (July 1941) but was never published.
- John Carter of Mars (Dell Comics): Dell published three comic issues in 1952, adapting the first three Barsoom books, drawn by Jesse Marsh, who was the Dell Tarzan artist at the time. They were Four Color issues #375, 437, and 488 respectively. They were later reprinted by the successor of Dell, Gold Key Comics as John Carter of Mars #1–3.
- ABC Magazine, Czechoslovakia: The first four Barsoom novels were printed as two comic book series (51 pages altogether) from 1970 to 1972 (Written by Vlastislav Toman, with painters Jiří Veškrna and Milan Ressel.) They were reprinted in 2001 in the comic book Velká Kniha Komiksů I.
- John Carter in Tarzan of the Apes (DC Comics): John Carter of Mars was published as a backup feature through issues #207–209 (April—June 1972) in the Tarzan series, after which it was moved to Weird Worlds, sharing main feature status alongside an adaptation of Burroughs' Pellucidar stories in issues #1–7 (September 1972 – October 1973); it again became a backup feature in Tarzan Family #62–64 (April – August 1976). A non-John Carter Barsoom story, titled "Amazon of Barsoom", appeared two issues earlier in Tarzan Family #60 (December 1975).
- John Carter, Warlord of Mars (Marvel Comics): This series began in 1977 and lasted for 28 issues (and saw three annuals published).
- The League of Extraordinary Gentlemen (DC Comics): John Carter made a notable cameo in the second volume of the series written by Alan Moore. Along with other literary Martian characters (including Gullivar Jones and the séroni), he leads a campaign against the Martians from The War of the Worlds.
- Tarzan/John Carter: Warlords of Mars (Dark Horse Comics): Running from January to June 1996, this limited series was the first standalone comic book crossover with Tarzan.
- Warlord of Mars (Dynamite Entertainment): Starting in October 2010, Dynamite began publishing an ongoing series entitled Warlord of Mars. The first two issues served as a prelude story, issues 3–9 adapted A Princess of Mars, and issues 10–12 were an original story.
- Warlord of Mars: Dejah Thoris (Dynamite Entertainment): Starting in March 2011, it is set 400 years before A Princess of Mars and focuses on Dejah Thoris, her first suitor, and her role in the rise to power of the Kingdom of Helium.
- Warlord of Mars: Fall of Barsoom (Dynamite Entertainment): Running from July 27, 2011, to January 25, 2012, it is set 100,000 years before A Princess of Mars and focuses on the attempt of two Orovars to save Mars as the seas dry up and the atmosphere becomes thin.
- John Carter: A Princess of Mars (Marvel Comics): Running from September 14, 2011, to January 18, 2012
- John Carter: World of Mars (Marvel Comics): Running from October 12, 2011, to January 18, 2012, this limited series serves as a prequel to the 2012 Disney film.
- Warriors of Mars (Dynamite Entertainment): Running from February 1, 2012, to October 24, 2012, this limited series deals with John Carter's encounter with Lt. Gullivar Jones, another earthman whose journey to the Red planet predated his own.
- John Carter: The Gods of Mars (Marvel Comics); Running from March 21, 2012, to July 25, 2012
- Dejah Thoris and the White Apes of Mars (Dynamite Entertainment): Running from April 4, 2012, to July 25, 2015, Dejah Thoris and her party are stranded on the way to an archeological dig at an ancient battle site at the 'face' of Mars. They take shelter in a dead, ancient city infested with killer white apes.
- A Princess of Mars — A Graphic Novel (Sterling Publishing): Published from May 28, 2012, this faithful adaptation is a part of Sterling's "Illustrated Classics" series which produces graphic novel adaptations of classic literature and was written by Ian Edginton and illustrated by I. N. J. Culbard, with a total of 136 pages. (ISBN 1454903600 / 978-1454903604)
- Dejah Thoris and the Green Men of Mars (Dynamite Entertainment): Running from February 20, 2013, to March 26, 2014
- Lords of Mars (Dynamite Entertainment): Running from August 7, 2013, to January 8, 2014, this limited series was the second standalone comic book crossover with Tarzan, after Dark Horse's Warlords of Mars.
- Dejah of Mars (Dynamite Entertainment): Running from May 28, 2014, to September 3, 2014
- Swords of Sorrow (Dynamite Entertainment): Running from May 6, 2015, to October 14, 2015, this limited series was a crossover event storyline uniting the pre-existing fictional heroines Dynamite had the rights to at the time, including Vampirella, Barbarella, Red Sonja, Kato, Jungle Girl, Lady Zorro, Eva, Miss Fury, Esmeralda Aguilar, Miss Masque and Irene Alder, of which Dejah Thoris was one of many.
- Swords of Sorrow: Dejah Thoris & Irene Adler (Dynamite Entertainment): Running from June 17, 2015, to August 5, 2015, a tie-in to the crossover event comic Swords of Sorrow.
- John Carter: Warlord of Mars (Dynamite Entertainment): Running from November 5, 2014, to December 23, 2015
- John Carter: The End (Dynamite Entertainment): Running from February 8, 2017, to July 14, 2017
- The Greatest Adventure (Dynamite Entertainment): Running from April 19, 2017, to February 7, 2018, this limited series was a crossover story uniting John Carter, Dejah Thoris, Tarzan, David Innes, Carson Napier and Jason Gridley in a wild chase through many locations from Africa, Caspak, Pellucidar, Barsoom and Amtor as the heroes journey to obtain the "Eye of Judgment", an ancient gemstone possessed by the villain Rokoff to power a doomsday device, capable of destroying everything in the universe.
- Vampirella/Dejah Thoris (Dynamite Entertainment): Running from September 26, 2018, to February 13, 2019, a crossover with Vampirella.
- Barbarella/Dejah Thoris (Dynamite Entertainment): Running from January 9, 2019, to June 19, 2019, a crossover with Barbarella.
- Carson of Venus/Warlord of Mars (American Mythology Productions): Published from June 2019, a standalone crossover with Carson Napier of the Amtor series.
- Warlords of Mars Attacks (Dynamite Entertainment): Running from June 19, 2019, to October 30, 2019, a crossover with Mars Attacks.
- Dejah Thoris vs. John Carter of Mars (Dynamite Entertainment): Running from July 21, 2021, to December 22, 2021
- John Carter of Mars (Dynamite Entertainment): Running from April 20, 2022, to August 31, 2022
- Dejah Thoris: Fairy Tales (Dynamite Entertainment): Published from August 24, 2022

=== Film ===
Princess of Mars was a 2009 direct-to-video film produced by The Asylum and starring Antonio Sabato Jr. as John Carter and Traci Lords as Dejah Thoris. This adaptation starts with John Carter as a wounded present-day sniper in Afghanistan who is teleported to another world as part of a government experiment.

John Carter, released on March 9, 2012, was a big-budget but critically mixed and financially unsuccessful live-action film by The Walt Disney Company, directed by Andrew Stanton and starring Taylor Kitsch as John Carter and Lynn Collins as Dejah Thoris.

== See also ==
- Jetan, a game invented by Burroughs and described in The Chessmen of Mars
- Pellucidar
