= Black Legion of Callisto =

1972 novel by Lin Carter

- Cover of the first edition.
- Author: Lin Carter
- Cover artist: Vincent Di Fate
- Language: English
- Series: Callisto series
- Genre: Science fantasy
- Publisher: Dell Books
- Publication date: 1972
- Publication place: United States
- Media type: Print (Paperback)
- Pages: 203
- ISBN: 978-0-86007-825-8
- Preceded by: Jandar of Callisto
- Followed by: Sky Pirates of Callisto

Black Legion of Callisto is a science fantasy novel by American writer Lin Carter, the second in his Callisto series. It was first published in paperback by Dell Books in December 1972, and reprinted twice through January 1974. The first British edition was published by Orbit Books in 1975. It was later gathered together with Jandar of Callisto into the omnibus collection Callisto: Volume 1 (2000). The book includes an appendix ("A Note on the Thanatorian Language") collating background information from this and the previous volume.

== Plot summary ==
Jonathan Dark (Jandar), earthman mysteriously transported to the Jovian moon of Callisto (or Thanator), has succeeded in rescuing Princess Darloona of Shondakar from the Sky Pirates of Zanadar, only to see her fall into the hands of the Black Legion, the mercenary force that had previously occupied her native city and driven her and her followers into exile.

Journeying to Shondakar, Jandar improbably finds himself in the Legion's good graces after saving the son of its leader, the very man that leader intends to have Darloona wed in order to cement his control of the city. Having essentially been given a free hand to spy on the enemy, Jandar scouts out the city's defenses and weaknesses, particularly its tunnel system. He disrupts the wedding as Darloona's Ku Thad people infiltrate Shondakar through the tunnels and take the occupiers by surprise.

Jandar kills the mastermind behind the princess's misfortunes, the supposed priest Oola, who is secretly one of the Mind Wizards conspiring to take over all of Thanator. But during the battle the Sky Pirates invade, and while the Ku Thad are ultimately victorious over both foes, Prince Thuton of Zanadar escapes, carrying Darloona back to the captivity from which Jandar sprung her in the previous volume. Back to square one...

== Reception ==
Reviewing this book along with the preceding and following volumes, Lester del Rey found the series to be "fairly entertaining reading," but noted that Carter had "copied every trick of Burroughs, including those that are faults."

Den Valdron, assessing the series in ERBzine, calls this book, along with the other two volumes in the series's first trilogy, "quite good." He notes "[t]he world and the hero are fairly vivid, the action moves quickly. It's hardly deep, but it is fun."
