= Jandar of Callisto =

1972 novel by Lin Carter

- Cover of the first edition.
- Author: Lin Carter
- Cover artist: Vincent Di Fate
- Language: English
- Series: Callisto series
- Genre: Science fantasy
- Publisher: Dell Books
- Publication date: 1972
- Publication place: United States
- Media type: Print (Paperback)
- Pages: 224 pp
- ISBN: 978-0-86007-801-2
- Followed by: Black Legion of Callisto

Jandar of Callisto is a science fantasy novel by American writer Lin Carter, the first in his Callisto series. It was first published in paperback by Dell Books in December 1972, and reprinted twice through September 1977. The first British edition was published by Orbit Books in 1974. It was later gathered together with Black Legion of Callisto into the omnibus collection Callisto: Volume 1 (2000). The book includes a map of Callisto as envisioned in the story.

== Plot summary ==
The story is told in the first person by the hero, Jonathan Dark, who is represented to be its author. Carter, the actual author, claims to have merely edited the manuscript, which, like subsequent works in the series, supposedly found its way to him from the ruins of the ancient city of Arangkhôr in Cambodia.

Dark, a helicopter pilot transporting medical supplies in Southeast Asia, is forced down in the jungles of Cambodia, where he discovers Arangkhôr. There he slides into a well made of a mysteriously slippery substance, which proves to be a device of unknown provenance that teleports him to another world. The world in question is eventually determined to be the Jovian moon of Callisto, which beneath a projected illusion of airless desolation turns out to have a breathable atmosphere, an alien biology, and human inhabitants (presumably descended from victims of the well during the period before Arangkhôr was abandoned). Callisto is known to its inhabitants as Thanator.

After nearly falling victim to a Yathib, one of the local predators, Dark is saved by a nomadic tribe of Yathoon, a race of intelligent insectoids. Rescue proves a mixed blessing, as he is also enslaved. While with them he learns Thanator's language, which is shared by Yathoon and human alike, and his captors learn his name, more or less. "Jandar" is the closest they can render "Jon Dark," and he remains Jandar through the rest of the series. Escaping, he encounters a beautiful woman in peril. For Jandar, it's love at first sight; she takes a bit longer to warm to him—three whole books, actually. She is the princess Darloona, who has been exiled from her native city-state of Shondakar by the conquering Black Legion. His attempts to aid her are not very effective, and they fall into the hands of another tribe of Yathoon.

They are delivered from this second captivity by the appearance of an airship commanded by Thuton, prince of the city-state of Zanadar. The Zanadarians are "Sky Pirates"—raiders who use the aerial technology they alone possess to abstract the possessions of others, in this instance Jandar and Darloona from the Yathoon. Thuton proves well-disposed to his fellow royal, but less so toward Jandar, who jealously goads him into a fight. As the prince is a master of the sword and the earthman has never picked up that particular skill, the outcome is predictable—and humiliating. The upshot is that Dark is once again a slave, this time in Zanadar.

In the Sky Pirates' city he manages to escape again, learns to fence, and raises his fellow slaves in a rebellion against their oppressors. In a bid to rescue Darloona, he takes on Thuton a second time. His comrades, who have taken over one of the Zanadarians' airships, are able to extract both him and the princess before he can be killed. Fleeing the city, they restore Darloona to her people, the Ku Thad, who have been living in the jungles of the Grand Kumala since their exile from Shondakar.

The celebration is short-lived, however, as the princess is shortly afterward carried off by a raiding party from the Black Legion.

== Reception ==
Reviewing this book along with the following two volumes, Lester del Rey found the series to be "fairly entertaining reading," but noted that Carter had "copied every trick of Burroughs, including those that are faults."

Den Valdron, assessing the series in ERBzine, calls this book, along with the other two volumes in the series's first trilogy, "quite good." He notes "[t]he world and the hero are fairly vivid, the action moves quickly. It's hardly deep, but it is fun." On the down side, he views Jandar as "kind of an arrogant jerk ... a bit of an egotist ... constantly getting into trouble with half baked plans [from which he] is regularly rescued by his friends or saved by dumb luck." Valdron also criticizes the relationship of the hero and heroine, between whom he detects no chemistry.
