= Lankar of Callisto =

1975 novel by Lin Carter

- Cover of the first edition.
- Author: Lin Carter
- Cover artist: Vincent Di Fate
- Language: English
- Series: Callisto series
- Genre: Science fantasy
- Publisher: Dell Books
- Publication date: 1975
- Publication place: United States
- Media type: Print (Paperback)
- Pages: 203
- ISBN: 0-440-04648-3
- Preceded by: Mind Wizards of Callisto
- Followed by: Ylana of Callisto

Lankar of Callisto is a science fantasy novel by American writer Lin Carter, the sixth in his Callisto series. It was first published in paperback by Dell Books in June 1975. It is noted for the author writing himself into the story.

== Plot summary ==
Throughout the series, author Lin Carter has portrayed himself as the recipient and editor of the manuscripts of protagonist Jonathan Dark (Jandar), teleported from the Jovian moon Callisto (moon) (or Thanator, as its inhabitants call it) to the ruined Cambodian city of Arangkhôr. In this volume he finally travels to Cambodia, hoping to learn what became of Jandar after the conclusion of the last volume of his memoirs, Mind Wizards of Callisto.

Once in Arangkhôr Carter accidentally falls into the well-like teleportation device himself, and is duly transported to the jungle moon as Jandar had been. A literal babe in the woods, he is hardly cut out to become an interplanetary hero; indeed, he spends much of his sojourn on Thanator mooning like a tourist over its extraordinary sights, likening them to wonders of which he has read or seen portrayed in various works of fantastic literature and art.

Carter is soon taken in hand by an othode, a forest creature with the personality of a faithful dog, which becomes his companion and protector against the local perils. It defends him against a Vastodon and later saves him from an immense spiderweb. Carter acquires another companion in the native boy Tarin, who had also been trapped in the web, and an abbreviated native-style name, "Lankar," which Tarin finds easier to pronounce.

They subsequently encounter warriors from Shondakar, the kingdom of Jandar's love interest Princess Darloona, and join the expedition against the hidden city of Kuur, lair of the evil Mind Wizards who hold the hero captive. Carter's othode even manages to uncover the secret entry to the city, but Carter himself is caught and imprisoned with Jandar.

All comes out well, as they are rescued by Tarin and in a climactic battle the Mind Wizards are almost all killed. (One is later revealed to have escaped, to permit sequel possibilities.) At the end of the story Carter manages to catch the return beam to Earth, content to resume his role as redactor of, rather than participant, in Jandar's adventures. Tarin and Fido the Othode, however, will go on to have other adventures in the subsequent volume Renegade of Callisto.

== Reception ==
Den Valdron, assessing the series in ERBzine, calls the book "an odd novel, more travelogue than adventure, and Carter's constant references to other works of fiction are a bit annoying ... [and suggest] a painful lack of imagination." He finds the plot and action thin, and the author an inadequate action hero, nothing that "the 'dog' that adopts him does practically all the work." His ultimate judgment is that "Lankar of Callisto is frankly embarrassing to read, what with its endless references to others' works, the obvious self consciousness and 'tweeness' of the author, and the fact that just about everything interesting happens offstage and to other people. It's an interesting conceit, but sadly it fails."
