= Sky Pirates of Callisto =

1973 novel by Lin Carter

- Cover of the first edition
- Author: Lin Carter
- Cover artist: Vincent Di Fate
- Language: English
- Series: Callisto series
- Genre: Science fantasy
- Publisher: Dell Books
- Publication date: 1973
- Publication place: United States
- Media type: Print (Paperback)
- Pages: 189
- ISBN: 978-0-86007-830-2
- Preceded by: Black Legion of Callisto
- Followed by: Mad Empress of Callisto

Sky Pirates of Callisto is a science fantasy novel by American writer Lin Carter, the third in his Callisto series. It was first published in paperback by Dell Books in January 1973, and reprinted twice through April 1974. The first British edition was published by Orbit Books in 1975. It includes an appendix ("Glossary of Characters in the Callisto Books") collating background information from this and previous volumes.

== Plot summary ==
Jonathan Dark (Jandar), earthman mysteriously transported to the Jovian moon of Callisto (or Thanator), has in concert with the native Ku Thad succeeded in freeing the city of Shondakar from the occupying Black Legion and the opportunistic Zanadarian Sky Pirates. The only fly in the ointment is that Shondakar's rightful ruler, the princess Darloona, has been abducted by the fleeing Prince Thuton of Zanadar.

To free Darloona, Jandar adopts the wild plan of taking one of the Sky Pirates' own captured airships to raid the enemy city. A Zanadarian prisoner brought along to help operate the craft treacherously scuttles the scheme by throwing Jandar overboard and sabotaging the airship.

Plopped into the Corund Laj, Thanator's greater sea, Jandar finds himself close enough to land to swim to safety, only to be enslaved by the mercantile Perushtar who rule its waves. Ironically, this results in him reaching his destination after all, as he is sold to the Zanadarians as gladatorial fodder. He has his hands full simultaneously surviving as a gladiator, hiding his identity as the Sky Pirates' arch enemy, and stirring up a revolt among his fellow slaves.

As the revolution ignites and he is found out, his allies' airship, now repaired, swoops in to administer the coup de grace. Zanadar is destroyed and the menace of the Sky Pirates ended by the explosion of the pocket of "lifting gas" over which the city is built and on which its air power is based. Best of all, Jandar at last finds favor with the rescued Darloona, whose relationship with him amid the perils and reverses of the previous books has been decidedly rocky.

== Reception ==
Reviewing this book along with the preceding two volumes, Lester del Rey found the series to be "fairly entertaining reading," but noted that Carter had "copied every trick of Burroughs, including those that are faults."

Den Valdron, assessing the series in ERBzine, calls this book, along with the other two volumes in the series's first trilogy, "quite good." He notes "[t]he world and the hero are fairly vivid, the action moves quickly. It's hardly deep, but it is fun."
