= Mad Empress of Callisto =

1975 novel by Lin Carter

- Cover of the first edition.
- Author: Lin Carter
- Cover artist: Vincent Di Fate
- Language: English
- Series: Callisto series
- Genre: Science fantasy
- Publisher: Dell Books
- Publication date: 1975
- Publication place: United States
- Media type: Print (Paperback)
- Pages: 191
- ISBN: 978-0-440-06143-4
- Preceded by: Sky Pirates of Callisto
- Followed by: Mind Wizards of Callisto

Mad Empress of Callisto is a science fantasy novel by American writer Lin Carter, the fourth in his Callisto series. It was first published in paperback by Dell Books in February 1975. It includes an appendix ("The Beasts of Thanator") collating background information from this and previous volumes.

== Plot summary ==
Jonathan Dark (Jandar) is now well settled into his new life as husband of Princess Darloona of Shondakar on the Jovian moon of Callisto (or Thanator). While out hunting with some companions they are kidnapped in a balloon by a force from the rival city of Tharkol. Their capture is part of a plot by Zamorra, empress of Tharkol, who under the mental influence of her advisor, the Mind Wizard Ang Chan is making an attempt to conquer all of Thanator.

Sprung from her dungeon by the thief Glypto, Jandar and his companions kidnap Zamorra and escape in the balloon. However, their craft is later attacked and brought down by a Ghastosar (a Thantorian flying creature resembling a pterodactyl), and the group falls into the hands of the insect-like Yathoon nomads. Once again Glypto is the key to their escape.

Striking out for Shondakar on foot, they encounter a caravan from the Soroba, only to find it a front for a military expedition from that city. They are rescued from the Sorobans by an airship, which they assume to be from Shondakar—but it is a Tharkolian ship, another unit in Zamorra's new airfleet.

The empress having gradually proven to be a decent sort during the party's adventures, Darloona tries to talk her out of her mad scheme. Discovering she has been controlled by Ang Chan, Zamorra is persuaded, and the upshot is a new alliance against the Mind Wizards made up of Tharkol, Shondakar and Soroba (ably represented by Glypto, now revealed to have been a Soroban spy).

== Reception ==
Den Valdron, assessing the series in ERBzine, calls this book, along with its sequel, Mind Wizards of Callisto, "high points" among the Callisto books, praising them as "rousing, fast paced adventures."
