= Ylana of Callisto =

1977 novel by Lin Carter

- Cover of the first edition.
- Author: Lin Carter
- Cover artist: Ken W. Kelly
- Language: English
- Series: Callisto series
- Genre: Science fantasy
- Published: 1977 (Dell Books)
- Publication place: United States
- Media type: Print (Paperback)
- Pages: 192
- ISBN: 0-440-14244-X
- Preceded by: Lankar of Callisto
- Followed by: Renegade of Callisto

Ylana of Callisto is a science fantasy novel by American writer Lin Carter, the seventh in his Callisto series. It was first published in paperback by Dell Books in October 1977. Its working title was evidently Jungle Maid of Callisto, as announced in Locus #198, January 30, 1977; the title used appears to be a nod to that of Edgar Rice Burroughs's Llana of Gathol, a book in the Barsoom series that inspired Carter's Callisto books. The character of Ylana, however, was established in Mind Wizards of Callisto, an earlier volume in the series. The novel includes an appendix ("The Men of Thanator") collating background information from this and previous volumes.

== Plot summary ==
The storyline begins during events covered in the previous volume in the series, Lankar of Callisto, in which most of the evil Mind Wizards threatening the Jovian moon of Callisto, or Thanator, were wiped out in the climactic battle. One last survivor of the villainous band seizes as hostages Ylana the jungle girl and her lover Tomar, and flees to take refuge with the Cave People, a tribe dominated by his race.

Together with Ylana's father, lately deposed as chief of the tribe, the two captives escape and head for the territory of the rival River People, pursued by a hunting party. Ylana is kidnapped by a River faction intent on fomenting war between the tribes, but the eventual conflict is limited to young malcontents from both, strengthening the power of the traditional authorities.

The threat of the Mind Wizard is ended when he is devoured by a plesiosaur, and all ends happily for Ylana and Tomar.

== Reception ==
According to Den Valdron, assessing the series in ERBzine, the book is "[b]etter than Lankar of Callisto, [and] Carter makes a real effort to keep the pages turning. But sadly, he offers nothing new and nothing remarkable, [and] the plot is thin with complications literally shoehorned in."
