= Mind Wizards of Callisto =

1975 novel by Lin Carter

- First edition of Mind Wizards of Callisto
- Author: Lin Carter
- Cover artist: Vincent Di Fate
- Language: English
- Series: Callisto series
- Genre: Science fantasy
- Publisher: Dell Books
- Publication date: 1975
- Publication place: United States
- Media type: Print (Paperback)
- Pages: 189 pp
- ISBN: 0-440-05600-4
- Preceded by: Mad Empress of Callisto
- Followed by: Lankar of Callisto

Mind Wizards of Callisto is a science fantasy novel by American writer Lin Carter, the fifth in his Callisto series. It was first published in paperback by Dell Books in March 1975. It includes a map by the author.

== Plot summary ==
A force of four airships bearing Jonathan Dark (Jandar) and his allies explores the unknown far side of the Jovian moon of Callisto (or Thanator), to seek and destroy Kuur, the secret stronghold of the evil Mind Wizards. The fleet is attacked by a flock of flying creatures called Zarkoons, and Jandar and the cabin boy Tomar are captured.

Flown to the Zarkoons' lair, they meet another captive, the jungle girl Ylana, with whom they manage to escape. A flier piloted by Jandar's allies Lukor and Koja spots and retrieves them, but damaged by the pursuing Zarkoons it subsequently crash lands. The five find themselves in the Cor Az, forest home of the Cave People, Ylana's tribe, where all but Ylana are again imprisoned, the Cave People being under the thumb of the enemy. With Ylana's assistance they escape once more, only to be retaken and held for the Mind Wizards.

Their ultimate fate is a mystery. An airship from the fleet later finds the memoir Jandar composed in captivity and hid as pursuit closed in. The manuscript is flown back to the civilized hemisphere of Thanator, whence with additional annotation it is afterwards teleported to Earth to become the basis of the present volume. The other three ships continue the quest for Kuur, but nothing has been heard from them as of the time of the last notation on the manuscript. With this cliffhanger the novel ends.

== Reception ==
Den Valdron, assessing the series in ERBzine, calls the book "one of the best, or better of the Callisto books, with enough novelty and action, and genuine sexiness to keep things fresh all the way," though noting "for the record, not a single damned Mind Wizard actually shows up anywhere in this book." He pairs it with its predecessor, Mad Empress of Callisto as a high point in the series, a "rousing, fast paced adventure ... filled with genuine tension and strangeness, and the cliff hanger ending as Jon Dark conceals his notes even as his pursuers close in on him is genuinely gripping."
