= The Chessmen of Mars =

1922 novel by Edgar Rice Burroughs

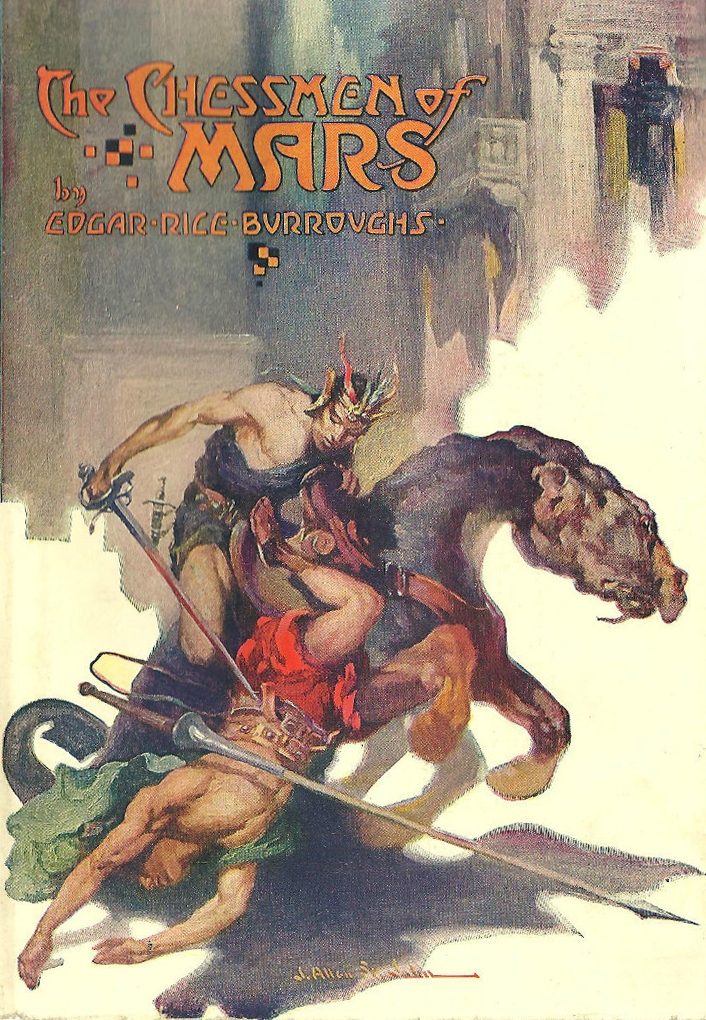
- dust-jacket of The Chessmen of Mars
- Author: Edgar Rice Burroughs
- Language: English
- Series: Barsoom
- Genre: Science fantasy
- Publisher: A. C. McClurg
- Publication date: 1922
- Publication place: United States
- Media type: Print (Hardback & Paperback)
- Pages: 375
- Preceded by: Thuvia, Maid of Mars
- Followed by: The Master Mind of Mars

The Chessmen of Mars is a science fantasy novel by American writer Edgar Rice Burroughs, the fifth of his Barsoom series. Burroughs began writing it in January, 1921, and the finished story was first published in Argosy All-Story Weekly as a six-part serial in the issues for February 18 and 25 and March 4, 11, 18 and 25, 1922. It was later published as a complete novel by A. C. McClurg in November 1922.

== Plot summary ==
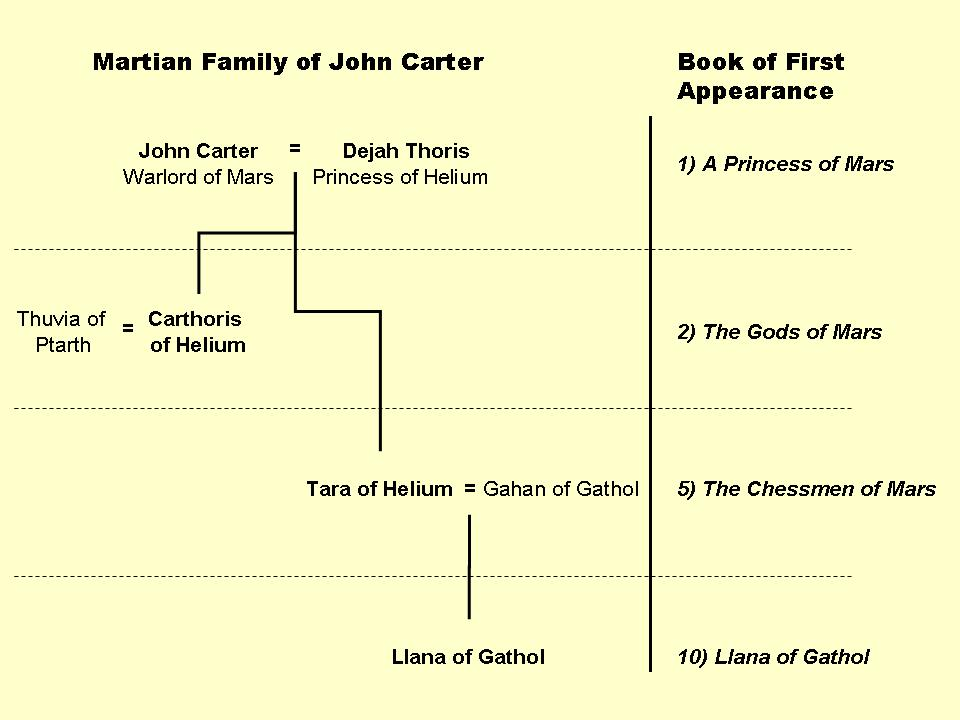
John Carter's descendants

In this novel Burroughs focuses on a younger member of the family established by John Carter and Dejah Thoris, protagonists of the first three books in the series. The heroine this time is their daughter Tara, princess of Helium, whose hand is sought by the gallant Gahan, jed (prince) of Gathol. Both Helium and Gathol are prominent Barsoomian city states.

Tara meets Prince Gahan of Gathol, and is initially unimpressed, viewing him as something of a popinjay. Later she takes her flier into a storm and loses control of the craft, and the storm carries her to an unfamiliar region of Barsoom. After landing and fleeing from a ferocious pack of banths (Martian lions), she is captured by the horrific Kaldanes, who resemble large heads with small, crab-like legs. The Kaldanes have bred a symbiotic race of headless human-like creatures called rykors, which they can attach themselves to and ride like horses. The Kaldanes imprison Tara, intending to fatten her up, then eat her. While imprisoned, Tara manages to win over one of the Kaldanes, Ghek, with her lovely singing voice.

Gahan, who has fallen in love with Tara, sets out to find her, only to find himself caught up in the same storm, and he falls overboard while attempting to rescue one of his crew. He stumbles into Bantoom, realm of the Kaldanes, and manages to rescue Tara, and together with Ghek they flee in Tara's crippled flier. Tara doesn't recognize Gahan as the unfamiliar prince she met earlier, as he is worn from his ordeals and no longer dressed in his fancy clothes. In light of her earlier reaction to him, Gahan decides to keep his identity secret, and identifies himself instead as a panthan (mercenary) called Turan.

The three of them manage to reach the isolated city of Manator. Gahan ventures into the city seeking food and water, but is tricked and taken prisoner by the inhabitants. Tara and Ghek are also captured. In Manator, captives are forced to fight to the death in an arena, in a modified version of jetan, a popular Martian board game resembling chess; the Manator version uses people as the game pieces on an arena-sized board, with each taking of a piece being a duel to the death.

== Writing ==
The novel was written during 1921, from January 7 to November 12. It was a particularly inventive and broad piece of imagination, including many details of the traditions, beasts and characters featuring in the novel. While working on the piece, Burroughs created a worksheet with 70 entries relating to architecture, locations, equipment, and geographical locations. Of these, probably the most remarkable is his creation of jetan, the Martian version of chess, played with living people in the city of Manator. Burroughs was himself a keen chess player and while writing the novel played games with his assistant, John Shea, which Burroughs invariably won. As he had done in prior Barsoom novels, Burroughs cast himself as John Carter's nephew, entrusted with Carter's manuscript of another Martian tale. He actually mentions these games with Shea in the opening pages of the novel.

== Genre ==
The novel can be classed as a planetary romance (also known as sword and planet). This genre is a subset of science fiction, similar to sword and sorcery, but including scientific elements. Most of the action in a planetary romance is on the surface of an alien world, usually includes sword fighting, monsters, supernatural elements as telepathy rather than magic, and involves civilizations echoing those on Earth in pre-technological eras, particularly composed of kingdoms or theocratic nations. Spacecraft may appear, but are usually not central to the story.

== Major characters ==
- Gahan of Gathol: A prince of the Martian kingdom of Gathol, who falls in love with Tara of Helium, but is initially spurned by her. He later disguises himself as a mercenary, 'Turan', after rescuing her from the valley of the Kaldanes, revealing his true identity at the conclusion of the tale, by which time Tara has fallen in love with him in his assumed identity.
- Tara of Helium: A princess of Helium, daughter of John Carter and Dejah Thoris.
- Ghek: A Kaldane, unusual among his kind in his ability to appreciate emotion, dissatisfied with Kaldane society who is charmed by Tara's singing, and joins Gahan of Gathol and Tara of Helium in their escape from the valley of the Kaldanes.

== Setting ==
=== Scientific basis ===
Burroughs' vision of Mars was loosely inspired by astronomical speculation of the time, especially that of Percival Lowell, who saw the planet as a formerly Earthlike world now becoming less hospitable to life due to its advanced age, whose inhabitants had built canals to bring water from the polar caps to irrigate the remaining arable land. Lowell was influenced by Italian astronomer, Giovanni Virginio Schiaparelli, who in 1878, had observed features on Mars he called canali (Italian for "channels", not canals, per-se). Mistranslation of this into English as "canals" fuelled belief the planet was inhabited. The theory of an inhabited planet with flowing water was disproved by data provided by Russian and American probes such as the two Viking missions which found a dead, frozen world where water could not exist in a fluid state.

=== World of Barsoom ===
A million years before the narrative commences, Mars was a lush world with oceans. As the oceans receded and the atmosphere grew thin, the planet devolved into a landscape of partial barbarism; living on an aging planet, with dwindling resources, the inhabitants of Barsoom have become hardened and warlike, fighting one another to survive. Barsoomians distribute scarce water supplies via a worldwide system of canals, controlled by quarreling city-states. The thinning Martian atmosphere is artificially replenished from an "atmosphere plant".

It is a world with clear territorial divisions between White, Yellow, Black, Red and Green skinned races. Each has particular traits and qualities, which seem to define the characters of almost every individual within them. Burroughs' concept of race in Barsoom, is more similar to species than ethnicity.

=== Specific settings ===
==== Bantoom, Valley of the Kaldanes ====
A hidden valley. Dwelling place of the Kaldanes, which are mostly brain, and the Rykors, headless bodies that the Kaldanes use as vehicles. The Kaldanes mostly live in tunnels below the ground. It is ruled by a king Kaldane, with exceptional telepathic powers. Tara of Helium ends up in Bantoom after her flier is blown off course by a massive storm.

==== Manator ====
A technologically backward Red Martian civilization, which has no firearms or fliers, survives by raiding caravans and prevents anyone from leaving their society. They have two distinctive traditions, firstly a habit of displaying the dead, covered in ornaments, and secondly playing a live version of the Martian chess, jetan. Gahan of Gathol, Tara of Helium and Kaldane, Ghek, discover the location while fleeing the valley of the Kaldanes.

== Excessive intellectualism as a theme ==
While Burroughs is generally seen as a writer who produced work of limited philosophical value, Burroughs wrote two Barsoom novels, which appear to explore, or parody, the limits of excessive intellectual development at the expense of bodily or physical existence. The first was Thuvia, Maid of Mars, in which Thuvia and Carthoris discover the Lotharians, a scant remnant of ancient White Martian civilization. The Lotharians have mostly died out, but maintain the illusion of a functioning society through powerful telepathic projections. They are divided in two factions, which appear to portray the excesses of pointless intellectual debate: One side – the realists – believes in imagining meals to provide sustenance, the others – the etherealists – believe in surviving without eating. The Chessmen of Mars is the second example of this trend.

The Chessmen of Mars introduces the Kaldanes of Bantoom. Their form is almost all head but for six spiderlike legs and a pair of chelae. Their racial goal is to evolve towards pure intellect and away from bodily existence. In order to function in the physical realm, they have bred the Rykors, a complementary species composed of a body similar to that of a perfect specimen of Red Martian but lacking a head. When the Kaldane places itself upon the neck of the Rykor, a bundle of tentacles connects with the Rykor's spinal cord, allowing the brain of the Kaldane to interface with the body of the Rykor. Should the Rykor become damaged or die, the Kaldane merely climbs upon another as an earthling might change a horse.

The Kaldanes have sacrificed their bodies to become pure brain, but although they can interface with Rykor bodies, their ability to function compared to a normal people, with an integrated mind and body, is ineffectual and clumsy. The Kaldanes, almost pure brain, are also, while highly intelligent, ugly ineffectual creatures when not interfaced with a Rykor body. Tara of Helium compares them to effete intellectuals from her home city, with a self-important sense of superiority, and Gahan of Gathol muses that it might be better to find a balance between the intellect and bodily passions.

== Jetan and its influence ==
The game of Jetan is a Martian variety of chess. The board consists of 10×10 black and orange squares, laid in an alternating pattern. Both black and orange players are given 20 pieces. In the novel it is played at life size, at the arena in the Barsoomian location of Manator, with actual living people, who are dressed to appear the same as the pieces they represent. The game is a fight to the death, when a warrior is moved into one of the squares, and a warrior of the opposing color occupies the space, the two must engage in mortal combat. The game is intended to portray a battle between the Black Martians of the south and the Yellow Martians of the North and hence the board is traditionally orientated to these directions. While criminals and slaves are usually used as pieces, nobles also participate on occasions. It is played in Manator to win a beautiful woman, usually an exceptionally comely slave. It undoubtedly originates from Burrough's own fascination with chess.

The game rules mirror the structure and plot of the book, with a powerful hero (Gahan of Gathol / the chief) who needs to rescue a beautiful damsel (Tara / the princess) from a terrible villain (U-Dor/the opponent chief). Burroughs also usually gives his hero a sidekick, and here there are two (the odwars). The other pieces make up the anonymous hosts of allies and henchmen.

On August 6, 1922 Burroughs received a letter from a prisoner, Elston B. Sweet, an inmate of Leavenworth Prison. Sweet and another inmate had used the references to Jetan in the pulp magazine to make a jetan set, with carved pieces, after which they had played numerous games, and the game had become popular with other prisoners. Burroughs wrote back on August 16, 1922 to inform the pair they had created the first ever actual set. Interest in the game from fans was high; consequently, he included the rules in an appendix, entitled "Jetan, or Martian chess", when the novel version was published. A chapter on the game was included in the 1968 book Chess Variations by John Gollon. Gollon made a Jetan set, curious about the game principally as a novelty and played with it; he was surprised by how much he enjoyed the game, and even described it as a 'respectable game'.

The concept inspired imitation by authors of later planetary romances influenced by Burroughs, each of whom felt compelled to invent their own extraterrestrial version of chess to be fought with human beings; instances of those include:

- Lin Carter's Darza, from Renegade of Callisto (8th volume in his Callisto series)
- Kenneth Bulmer's Jikaida, from A Life for Kregen (19th volume in his Dray Prescot series)
- John Norman's Kaissa, from his Gor series, mentioned many times, though never fully described
- S. M. Stirling's Atanj, from In the Courts of the Crimson Kings, his own Burroughs-influenced novel of an alternate Mars, also with the game not fully described

J. K. Rowling's Harry Potter and the Sorcerer's Stone provides a rare instance of its use in fantasy, in a scene in which her three protagonists Harry, Hermionie, and Ron must play as pieces in a lifelike game of wizards' chess

Dan Simmon's horror novel Carrion Comfort has Nazi chess masters with psychic powers that permits them to enter into the minds of concentration camp prisoners allowing them to be completely controlled as pawns in deadly games of chess.

== Copyright ==
The copyright for this story has expired in the United States and, thus, now resides in the public domain there. The text is available via Project Gutenberg.

== Popular culture ==
In the HBO series Boardwalk Empire, 4th season, the character Richard Harrow carries a copy of the book.

In the Phantom Liberty expansion of Cyberpunk 2077, the character Mr. Hands, a fixer, is seen reading a copy of the book.

== Sources ==
- Bleiler, Everett (1948). The Checklist of Fantastic Literature. Chicago: Shasta Publishers. p. 66.
