= Imaginary Worlds: The Art of Fantasy =

Book by Lin Carter

Imaginary Worlds: the Art of Fantasy
- Cover of the first edition
- Author: Lin Carter
- Cover artist: Gervasio Gallardo
- Language: English
- Series: Ballantine Adult Fantasy series
- Publisher: Ballantine Books
- Publication date: 1973
- Publication place: United States
- Pages: 278
- ISBN: 0-345-03309-4
- Preceded by: Lovecraft: A Look Behind the "Cthulhu Mythos"

Imaginary Worlds: the Art of Fantasy is a study of the modern literary fantasy genre written by Lin Carter. It was first published in paperback by Ballantine Books in June, 1973 as the fifty-eighth volume of its Ballantine Adult Fantasy series; it was the only nonfiction entry in the series. It was reprinted in trade paperback by Wildside Press in August 2024. The book was among the earliest full-length critical works devoted to fantasy writers and the history of fantasy. It was the third of three such studies by Carter, being preceded by Tolkien: A Look Behind "The Lord of the Rings" (1969) and Lovecraft: A Look Behind the "Cthulhu Mythos" (1972). These works, together with his editorial guidance of the Ballantine Adult Fantasy series, established Carter as an authority on the genre.

== Summary ==
Carter's study was intended to serve as an introduction to fantasy. The first eight chapters detail the history of the modern genre from the late nineteenth century through the early 1970s, when Carter was writing, a subject he had previously covered more briefly in Tolkien: A Look Behind "The Lord of the Rings". Its origins are discovered in the novels of William Morris, and followed through the writings of Lord Dunsany, E. R. Eddison and James Branch Cabell. Separate attention is then devoted to the subsequent development of fantasy in America and Britain, focusing on the pulp magazine tradition in the former and the continuing dominance of the more literary tradition in the latter. The work of contemporary fantasists is then detailed. Three additional chapters form a sort of "how to" course on the writing of fantasy, illustrated with examples from Carter's own writings. (Some of these, like The White Throne and Khymyrium, bear the peculiar interest of being works in progress or projected that in the event were never published in complete form.) Bibliographies of general references and the Ballantine Adult Fantasy series complete the study.

== Contents ==
- Introduction: The Empire of Imagination...
- 1. From Uruk to Utterbol: William Morris and the First Fantasy Novels
- 2. The World’s Edge, and Beyond: The Fiction of Dunsany, Eddison, and Cabell
- 3. Lost Cities, Forgotten Ages: The Rise of Fantasy in the American Pulp Magazines
- 4. The Mathematics of magic: Imaginary Worlds Fantasy in Unknown
- 5. From The Night Land to Narnia: The Road to The Lord of the Rings
- 6. The Inklings Produce a Classic: The Achievement of Tolkien and His Influence
- 7. Post-Howardian Heroica: The Swordsman and Sorcerers’ Guild of America, Ltd
- 8. The Young Magicians: Some Modern Masters of Fantasy
- 9. Of World-Making: Some Problems of the Invented Milieu
- 10. A Local Habitation and a Name: Some Observations on Neocogomina
- 11. The Tricks of the Trade: Some Advanced Techniques of World-Making
- Bibliography I: General References
- Bibliography II: The Adult Fantasy Series
- Index

== Reception ==
The fanzine Amra praises the work as "a comprehensive how-to-do-it book on the writing of fantasy with ... intensive coverage of ... Heroic Fantasy. Well worth reading, even though you may disagree with some of [Carter's] opinions. Includes an extensive but incomplete (all such lists are incomplete) reading list."

In a comprehensive discussion of the book, Fritz Leiber focuses on it as a pioneering study of the whole fantasy fiction genre, observing "[a]t last other critics [will] have something to add to or disagree with." He writes "[i]t doesn't have to be more than a reasonably adequate job and cover most of the territory, though this book is and does." While conceding that "[i]t can't be the Last word, if only because it's the first," he asserts "[p]eople [will] wonder how they ever got along without it." Of the style, he states "Carter writes in a free and easy, bumptious way, discussing his own fiction, written and unwritten, casually scoring points against Tolkien as well as for [him], thumbnail-sketching plots and doing other breezy things calculated to make more portentous critics register shock. Myself, I like it."

Cy Chauvin in Amazing Science Fiction calls the book "a fairly in-depth survey," and its final three chapters on tricks of the trade "especially important to the fantasy writer." He notes "it's a very easy and enjoyable book to read," though "not an academic [or] critical work," and criticizes the "excessive (and wholly unnecessary ...) number of footnotes, which might make [it] look very scholarly ... to the casual newsstand browser." While feeling "Carter does have his faults and idiosyncrasies," Chauvin states that "[s]till, within its limits Imaginary Worlds is an excellent book, and I can't imagine any reader who pours over de Camp's Literary Swordsmen & Sorcerers in Fantastic, or the various introductions Carter writes to the other books in Ballantine's Adult Fantasy Series, not enjoying it."

The book was also reviewed in Aurora, March 1974, as well as by Damon Knight in Orbit 14, 1974, Richard Lupoff in Algol no. 22, May 1974, and James R. Thrane in The Baum Bugle, Autumn 1977.

== See also ==
- Fictional location
- Fantasy world
- High fantasy
- Paracosm
- Worldbuilding
