= Human chess =

Chess game with actual people as figures

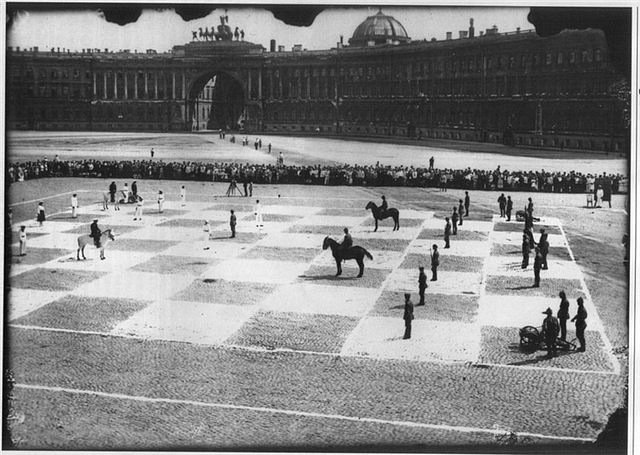
A game of human chess at Palace Square, Leningrad, Soviet Union (1924)

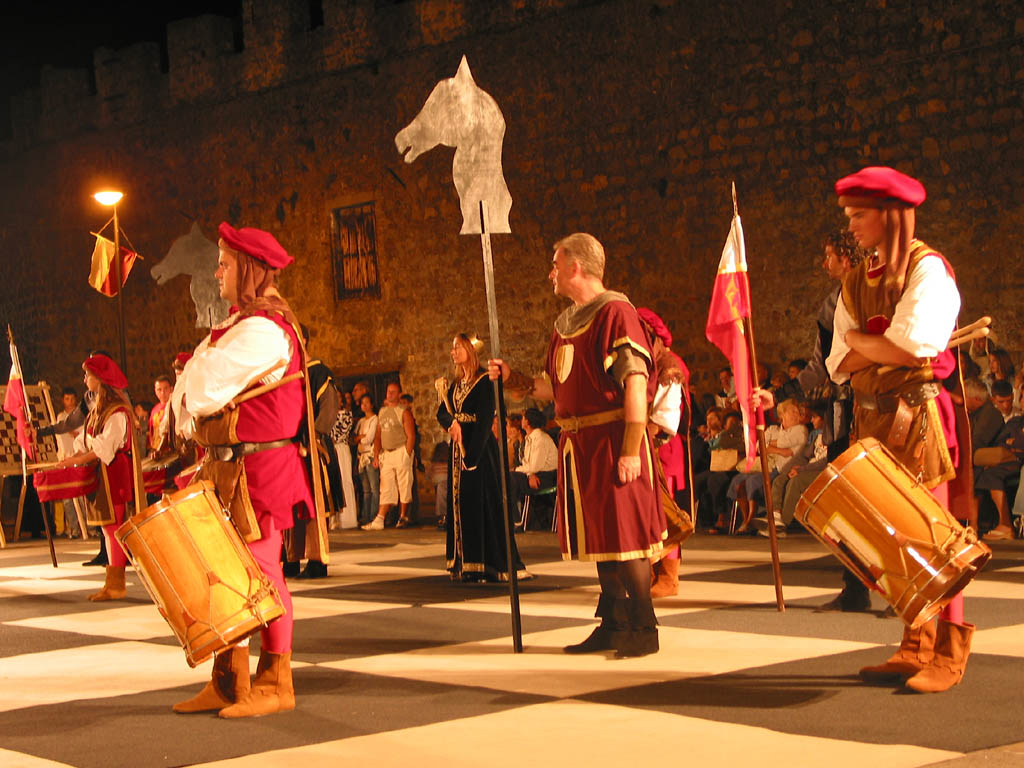
A game of human chess in Monselice, Italy

Human chess, living chess or live chess is a form of chess in which people take the place of pieces. The game is typically played outdoors, either on a large chessboard or on the ground, and is often played at Renaissance fairs.

In Vietnam, human chess is one of the folk games that take place during folk festivals in general and the Northern Delta in particular, especially during the Lunar New Year of the nation.

== Forms ==
Many human chess games are choreographed stage shows performed by actors trained in stage combat. When this is the case, piece captures are represented by choreographed fights that determine whether the piece is actually taken or not. Alternatively, the pieces may spar, following rules similar to those used by the Society for Creative Anachronism.

== Instances ==
A costumed human chess game has been staged every two years in the second week of September in the Italian city of Marostica, in Province of Vicenza, since 1923. The game commemorates a legendary chess game played in 1454 by two young knights in order to settle which of them would court the lady that both had fallen in love with. The event lasts three days. The participants of the game dress in historic clothes. The human chess game has strict rules which have been set by a specific committee. The performance lasts 30 minutes.

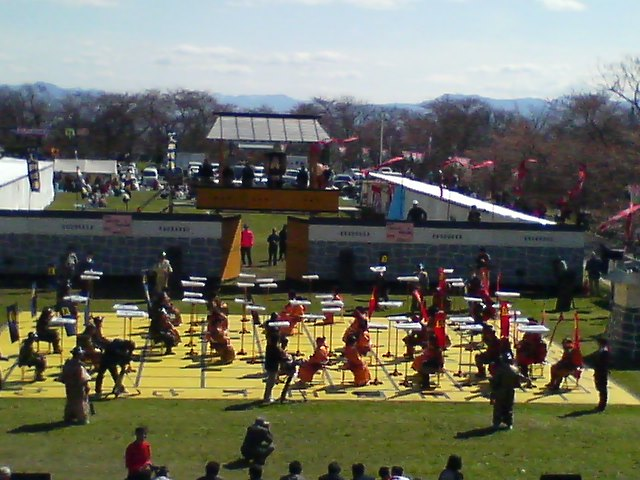
Human shogi

In terms of the Japanese game of shogi, an annual festival in Tendō, Yamagata, held every late April, has an event called Ningen Shōgi (人間将棋), where people involved are dressed in Sengoku period costumes alongside large shogi pieces with stands. Tendō and Marostica have been sister cities since 1993.

In Xiangqi, human chess is a tradition in Vietnam, where it is called cờ người, and is a feature at many Vietnamese village and temple festivals.

=== Fictional representations ===
Human chess is a theme in Lewis Carroll's Through the Looking-Glass (1871).

The Edgar Rice Burroughs pulp novel The Chessmen of Mars depicts an ordeal called Jetan, which is a Martian variant of chess in which the pieces are all human captives, and captures in the game are replaced by fights to the death between them.

In the TV program Land of the Giants "Deadly Pawn" (se.2, ep.4), an insane chess master uses the little people as live chess pieces; if they cannot escape, they are either turned over to the SIDE, or killed.

The 1981 comedy film History of the World, Part I shows a human chess game being played between French King Louis XVI (Mel Brooks) and one of his courtiers.

The book and movie Harry Potter and the Philosopher's Stone features a game of Wizard's chess with magically animated human-sized pieces. The characters Harry, Ron, and Hermione take the place of three of the pieces.

An episode of the TV series Hunters featured a game of human chess, staged as having been played at a concentration camp during WWII. The Auschwitz Museum criticized the episode, since no such game ever actually took place.

Episode "Checkmate" of The Prisoner features the protagonist in such a chess match.

The section "Chess" in the horror movie Tales of the Unusual features a human chess game in which the main protagonist is forced to play. Those human chess pieces who are eliminated in the game seem to be killed; at the end it is revealed that all the killings and deaths were faked.

Human chess played by Nazi vampires with concentration camp prisoners is a key plotline in the classic Dan Simmons horror novel, Carrion Comfort.
