= Renegade of Callisto =

1978 science fantasy novel by Lin Carter

- Cover of the first edition
- Author: Lin Carter
- Cover artist: Ken W. Kelly
- Language: English
- Series: Callisto series
- Genre: Science fantasy
- Publisher: Dell Books
- Publication date: 1978
- Publication place: United States
- Media type: Print (Paperback)
- Pages: 218
- ISBN: 0-440-14377-2
- Preceded by: Ylana of Callisto

Renegade of Callisto is a science fantasy novel by American writer Lin Carter, the eighth and last in his Callisto series. It was first published in paperback by Dell Books in August 1978, and reprinted once, in November of the same year. A tribute to Edgar Rice Burroughs's The Chessmen of Mars, the book introduces the game of Darza, Carter's equivalent of Jetan (Martian Chess). An appendix ("Darza, The Chess Game of Callisto") details the rules.

== Plot summary ==
In the final adventure set on the Jovian moon Callisto, or Thanator, three comrades of series hero Jandar are lost in a damaged airship. Jungle boy Taran, Yathoon warrior Koja and their pet othode Fido, drift away from the city of Shondakar into the plains ruled by the insectoid Yathoon hordes.

Taken captive by one of the hordes, they meet fellow prisoner Xara, princess of Ganatol, waylaid on her way to Shondakar to secure an alliance against the mercantile Perushtar city-states.

Koja and Borak, another Yathoon prisoner, escape and find sanctuary with Koja's own horde, while Taran and Xara are saved by another airship sent by Jandar to locate the missing protagonists. Xara falls in love with Vandar, the ship's captain. Unfortunately, rescued and rescuers are quickly retaken by the Yathoon and carried away to Sargol, the hidden capital of all the insectoid hordes.

Koja, who has reassumed the leadership he once held over his own horde, is there as well. He challenges the Yathoon emperor to a duel for the right to rule the combined hordes. The contest takes the form of a game of Darza (Thanatorian chess), utilizing as pieces live players who must fight to the death. Taran, Xara and Valkar become some of Koja's "pieces."

The game is interrupted by Fido and other othodes, and Koja and the emperor end up fighting singly. Koja is triumphant, becoming the new emperor of the hordes, and his human companions are saved. Jandar shows up in the denouement to help celebrate and take the protagonists home to Shondakar.

== Unwritten sequels ==
In his introduction to Callisto, Volume I (2001), the ebook edition of the first two Callisto novels, John Gregory Betancourt, adopting Carter's teasing pretense that the books represent the true memoirs of protagonist Jonathan Dark, alleges the existence of further Dark manuscripts, including one titled The Ice Kingdom of Callisto, left in the hands of Carter's literary executor, Robert M. Price. Price himself notes elsewhere that Carter actually did project seven additional volumes in the series with the working titles Sword-Master of Callisto, Xara of Callisto, Warrior Girl of Callisto, Ice Kingdom of Callisto, Kaldar of Callisto, Lost Prince of Callisto, and Zamara of Callisto. He gives no indication any of these were actually written, however, or even plotted in any detail past Sword-Master.

== Reception ==
According to Den Valdron, assessing the series in ERBzine, "it reads as inferior Barsoom." Renegade he views as "somewhat of a recovery" from the previous two weak entries, and finds it "acceptable, even good."
