= Lovecraft: A Look Behind the Cthulhu Mythos =

1972 non-fiction book by Lin Carter

Lovecraft: A Look Behind the "Cthulhu Mythos"
- Author: Lin Carter
- Language: English
- Publisher: Ballantine Books
- Publication date: 1972
- Publication place: United States
- Preceded by: Tolkien: A Look Behind "The Lord of the Rings"
- Followed by: Imaginary Worlds: The Art of Fantasy

Lovecraft: A Look Behind the "Cthulhu Mythos" is a 1972 non-fiction book written by Lin Carter, published by Ballantine Books. The introduction notes that the book "does not purport to be a biography of H. P. Lovecraft", and instead presents it as "a history of the growth of the so-called Cthulhu Mythos."

== The Cthulhu Mythos ==
The Cthulhu Mythos is the system of imaginary entities, books, and locations initially invented by Lovecraft and shared with other writers. Carter takes particular interest in noting the stories where particular aspects of Mythos lore first appeared, and tracing their reappearances in later tales.

The book takes pains to establish whether each Lovecraft story "belongs to the Cthulhu Mythos" or not. His requirement for including a story on the list of Mythos stories is that it must "present us with a significant item of information about the background lore of the Mythos, thus contributing important information to a common body of lore."

He excludes by this criterion such stories as "The Colour Out of Space" and The Case of Charles Dexter Ward, despite the former's mentions of Arkham and Miskatonic University, and the latter's references to Yog-Sothoth and the Necronomicon. "[T]he mere mention of a Mythos name in an otherwise self-contained story cannot be taken as proof that the story belongs to the Mythos," he writes; such stories do not "borrow from or build upon the system of the Mythos", nor do they "contribute a new portion of background lore to future stories in the Mythos."

He asserts that at least one story does not belong to the Mythos simply because it doesn't fit in. "Despite the criteria established" earlier in the biography, he writes, The Dream-Quest of Unknown Kadath "most definitely does not belong to the Mythos." His basis for this judgment: "Lovecraft wrote two cycles of tales ... both cycles certainly share the same universe in common, but each cycle is and must be considered peripheral to the other." Carter, together with most Lovecraft critics and readers, puts this novella in Lovecraft's Dream Cycle.

== List of Cthulhu Mythos stories ==
Carter's list of Lovecraft's Cthulhu Mythos stories:

1. "Dagon"
2. "Nyarlathotep"
3. "The Nameless City"
4. "The Hound"
5. "The Festival"
6. "The Call of Cthulhu"
7. "The Dunwich Horror"
8. "The Whisperer in Darkness"
9. "The Dreams in the Witch House"
10. "At the Mountains of Madness"
11. "The Shadow Over Innsmouth"
12. "The Shadow out of Time"
13. "The Haunter of the Dark"
14. "The Thing on the Doorstep"
15. "History of the Necronomicon" (short essay)
16. Fungi from Yuggoth (poem)

== Criticism ==
Carter writes as a fan of Lovecraft, but not uncritically. Surveying Lovecraft's work, he says:

He has no ability at all for creating character, or for writing dialogue. His prose is stilted, artificial, affected. It is also very overwritten, verbose, and swimming in adjectives. His plotting is frequently mechanical, and his major stylistic device, which becomes tiresome, is the simple trick of withholding the final revelation until the terminal sentence--and then printing it in italics, presumably for maximum shock value.

Carter frequently excoriates Lovecraft for his lack of professionalism, and bluntly condemns what he finds to be Lovecraft's racism, xenophobia, and anti-Semitism:

[H]is loathing of "Jews and foreigners" was something more than merely the snobbery of one of "pure" English descent, soured by the provincialism of his Rhode Island background. It was, I suppose, nearly if not actually pathological.
