= Kaldane =

Fictitious sapient species

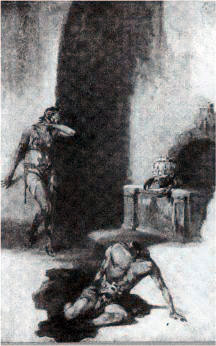
Kaldane and rykor as illustrated by J. Allen St. John in first edition of Chessmen of Mars

The Kaldanes are a fictitious sapient species existing in the region of Bantoom on the planet Barsoom in the John Carter series of books by Edgar Rice Burroughs. Introduced in the book Chessmen of Mars, the Kaldanes are almost all head, but for six arachnoid legs and a pair of chelae. Their racial goal is to achieve pure intellect against bodily existence.

It is only your brain that makes you superior to the banth, but your brain is bound by the limitations of your body. Not so, ours. With us brain is everything. Ninety per centum of our volume is brain. We have only the simplest of vital organs and they are very small for they do not have to assist in the support of a complicated system of nerves, muscles, flesh and bone. We have no lungs, for we do not require air. Far below the levels to which we can take the rykors is a vast network of burrows where the real life of the kaldane is lived. There the air-breathing rykor would perish as you would perish. There we have stored vast quantities of food in hermetically sealed chambers. It will last forever. Far beneath the surface is water that will flow for countless ages after the surface water is exhausted. We are preparing for the time we know must come -- the time when the last vestige of the Barsoomian atmosphere is spent -- when the waters and food are gone. For this purpose were we created, that there might not perish from the planet Nature's divinest creation -- the perfect brain.

In order to function in the physical realm, the Kaldanes have bred the Rykors: a nonsentient complementary species composed of a body similar to that of a Red Martian but lacking a head; when the Kaldane places itself upon the shoulders of the Rykor, a bundle of tentacles connects with the Rykor's spinal cord, allowing the brain of the Kaldane to control its motor nerves and sensory nerves. Should the Rykor become damaged or die, the Kaldane climbs upon another.

Immediately I control every muscle of the rykor's body—it becomes my own, just as you direct the movement of the muscles of your body. I feel what the rykor would feel if he had a head and brain. If he is hurt, I would suffer if I remained connected with him, but the instant one of them is injured or becomes sick we desert it for another. As we could suffer the pains of their physical injuries, similarly do we enjoy the physical pleasures of the rykors.

Although the Rykors breed like other animals, the Kaldanes do not breed except for their "king":

He produces many eggs from which we, the workers and the warriors, are hatched; and one in every thousand eggs is another king egg, from which a king is hatched. Did you notice the sealed openings in the room where you saw Luud? Sealed in each of those is another king. If one of them escaped he would fall upon Luud and try to kill him and if he succeeded we should have a new king; but there would be no difference. His name would be Luud and all would go on as before, for are we not all alike? Luud has lived a long time and has produced many kings, so he lets only a few live that there may be a successor to him when he dies. The others he kills.

The Kaldanes are also imbued with conscious race memory, obtained through selective breeding. They are carnivorous, and sometimes feed upon the Rykors.

Ghek had never seen an ulsio, since these great Martian rats had long ago disappeared from Bantoom, their flesh and blood having been greatly relished by the kaldanes; but Ghek had inherited, almost unimpaired, every memory of every ancestor, and so he knew that ulsio inhabited these lairs and that ulsio was good to eat, and he knew what ulsio looked like and what his habits were, though he had never seen him nor any picture of him. As we breed animals for the transmission of physical attributes, so the Kaldanes breed themselves for the transmission of attributes of the mind, including memory and the power of recollection, and thus have they raised what we term instinct, above the level of the threshold of the objective mind where it may be commanded and utilized by recollection.

In the Wold Newton Universe, the kaldanes are said to be descended from mutated Sarmaks which, in turn, were possibly descended from Cthulhuoids. In Larry Niven's Rainbow Mars, Kaldanes also appear, although they are called the Tunnel Crabs.
