= Marostica =

Marostica Maròstega (Venetian)
- Comune
- Città di Marostica
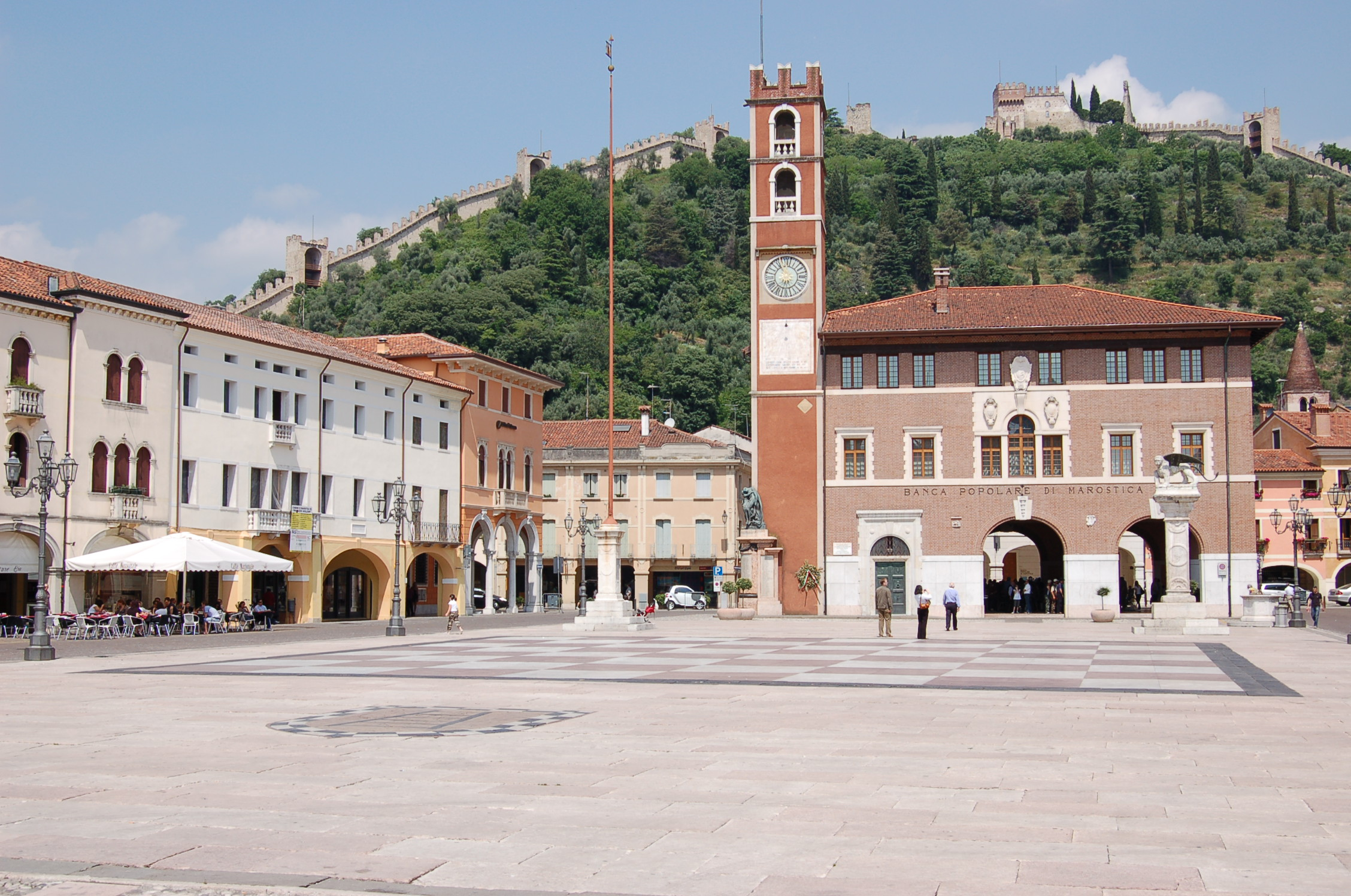
- Main square in Marostica, with chess field floor

- Flag Coat of arms

- Location within Italy Location within Veneto
- Coordinates: 45°45′N 11°39′E
- Country: Italy
- Region: Veneto
- Province: Vicenza (VI)
- Frazioni: Crosara, Marsan, Pradipaldo, San Luca, Valle San Floriano, Vallonara

Government
  - Mayor: Matteo Mozzo

Area
  - Total: 36 km^{2} (14 sq mi)
- Elevation: 103 m (338 ft)

Population (December 31, 2010)
  - Total: 13,824
  - Density: 380/km^{2} (990/sq mi)
- Demonym: Marosticensi
- Time zone: UTC+1 (CET)
  - Summer (DST): UTC+2 (CEST)
- Postal code: 36063
- Dialing code: 0424
- Patron saint: St. Simeon
- Website: Official website

Marostica (Italian pronunciation: [maˈrɔstika]; Venetian: Maròstega [maˈɾɔsteɡa]), is a town and comune in the province of Vicenza, Veneto, northern Italy. It is mostly famous for its live chess event and for the local cherry variety.

== History ==
Between the 11th and 13th centuries, the locality was greatly influenced by several members of the important medieval family from the Veneto, known as the Ezzelini. They were finally defeated in 1260. Marostica was a Venetian city until Venice joined Italy. During the 19th century it was mainly a relatively poor town; a great number of inhabitants went to look for fortune in Brazil and many other places in the world. The wealth of the town grew greatly after the second world war.

Marostica is famous for the human chess game it carries out every 2 years (in the even-numbered years) with living chess pieces in the city public square during the 2nd weekend in September of even-numbered years, this reenacted game of chess using live pieces.

Marostica is also home to the Diesel Farm, a wine, grappa, and olive oil-producing establishment, founded by Diesel founder Renzo Rosso. Marostica is also very famous for the production of cherries, used in the preparation of a typical cake, served in many cafes and restaurants in the area.

== The Festival ==
The festival originated when, after the First World War, members of the local chess club began playing chess in the main square with 10 cm gilded pieces which caught the attention of then mayor Bonomo and the architect Mirko Vucetich. They became inspired and set about reviving the biennial reenactment of the life-sized human chess match that had been interrupted due to the wartime events. After the Second World War, some 20 years later, the artist Mario Mirko Vucetich who authored the work entitled “The Chess Game,” in which the original legend is memorialized, designed the new elements of the festival.

The renovated chess board measured 16 meters per side, framed by a large band of black tarchite, which contains the 64 square squares obtained from 4 slabs of pink Conco marble and Asiago biancone. In addition to the newly renovated chessboard, the medieval costumes and sets of the era were also redesigned.

The original game was played long in the past that the original moves by the knights have been lost to time so a group of designated chess players choose one of the more famous chess matches in recent history to use at the formal presentation.

During the presentation once one of the two knights/suitors have made a move, a crier calls out the movement for the living chess piece; these orders are still given out in the "Serenissima Republic of Venice" dialect.

=== The Story ===
The festival is based on a legend, set in September 1454. It tells the story of two noblemen, Rinaldo D'Angarano and Vieri da Vallanora, who both fell in love with Lionora, the daughter of the local lord, Taddeo Parisio. As was the custom at that time, they challenged each other to a duel to win her hand. The Lord of Marostica, not wanting to make an enemy of either suitor nor lose them in a duel, forbade the encounter. He decreed instead that the two rivals would play a chess game and the winner would have the hand of Lionora. The loser of the chess game would also join the family, by marrying her younger sister, Oldrada. The chess match took place on September 12 in the year 1454.

The reenactment of the legendary chess match takes place on the square in front of the Lower Castle with supporters carrying the noble ensigns of Whites and Blacks, in the presence of the Lord, his noble daughter, the Lords of Angarano and Leoncavallo, the court and the entire town population. The Lord also decides the challenge would be honoured by an exhibition of armed men, foot-soldiers and knights, with fireworks, dances and music, which makes the approximately 20 minute chess game the anchor of a festival of epic proportions.

== International relations ==
=== Twin towns – Sister cities ===
Marostica is twinned with:

- São Bernardo do Campo, Brazil
- Tendō, Japan
- Mignano Monte Lungo, Italy
- Montigny-le-Bretonneux, France

== Notable people ==
- Prospero Alpini, physician and botanist, born 1553
- Giovanni Battaglin, cyclist, Giro d'Italia and Vuelta a España winner
- Giancarlo Bonato (1930-2016) craftsman, artist and entrepreneur
- Tatiana Guderzo, cyclist, Italian and World Champion
- Enrico Battaglin, cyclist

== Gallery ==
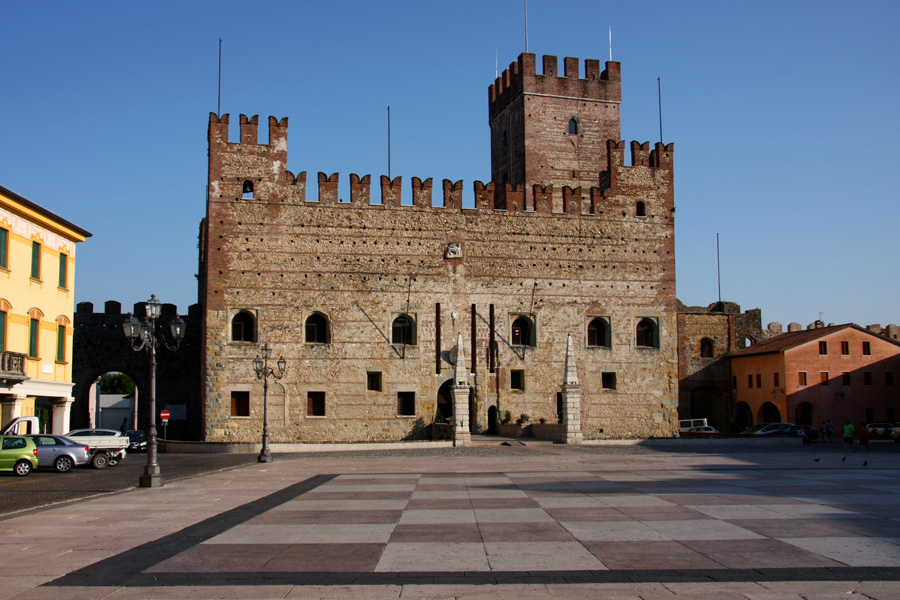
The lower castle on Piazza degli Scacchi

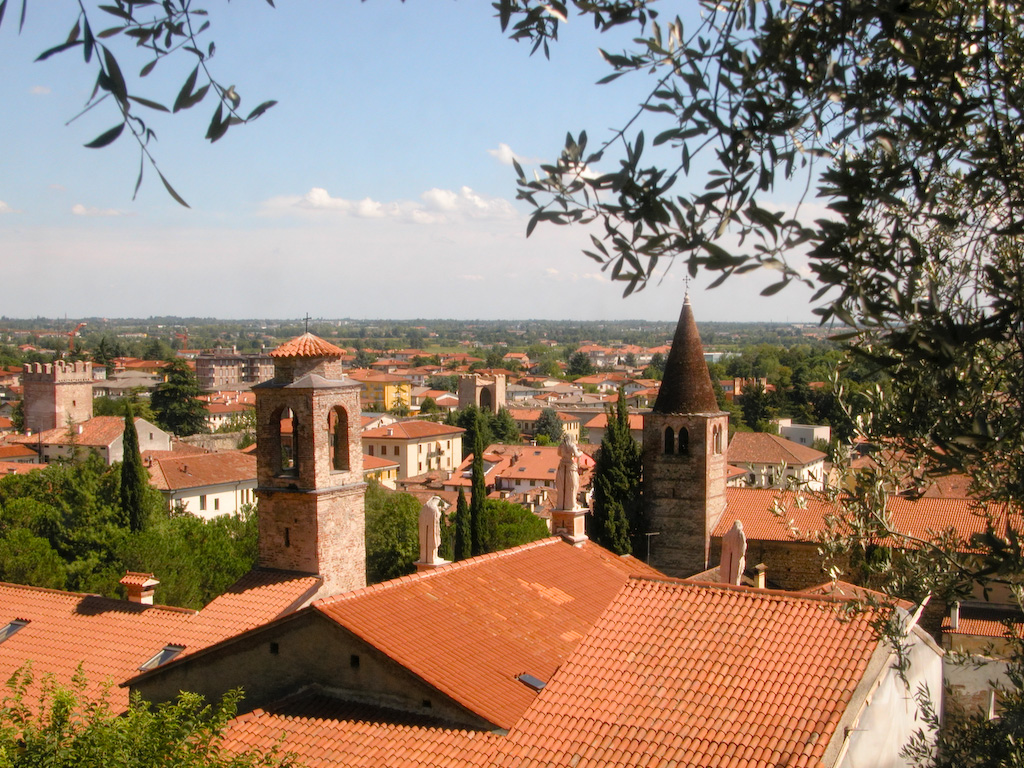
The town

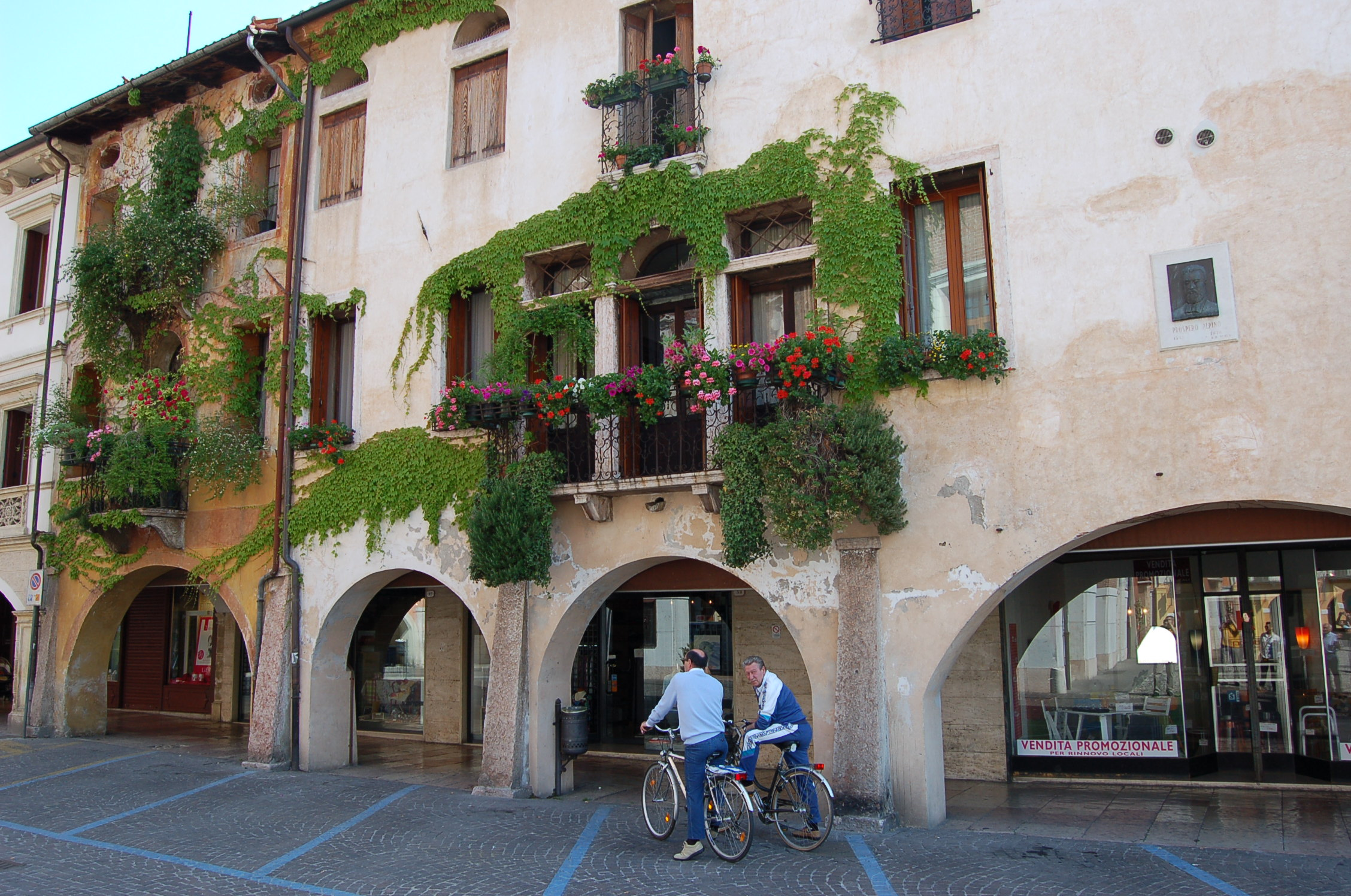
One side of Piazza degli Scacchi

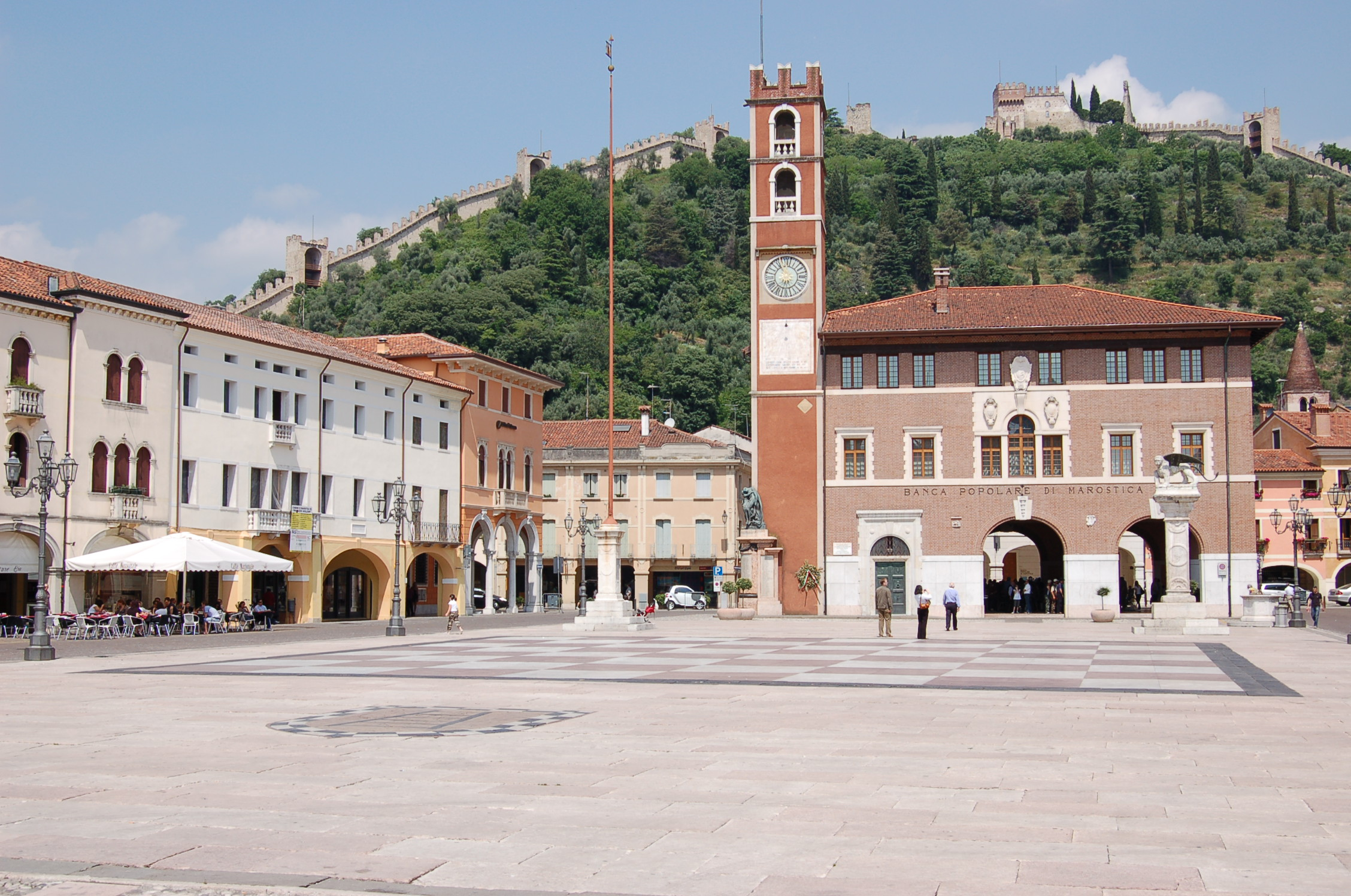
Piazza degli Scacchi

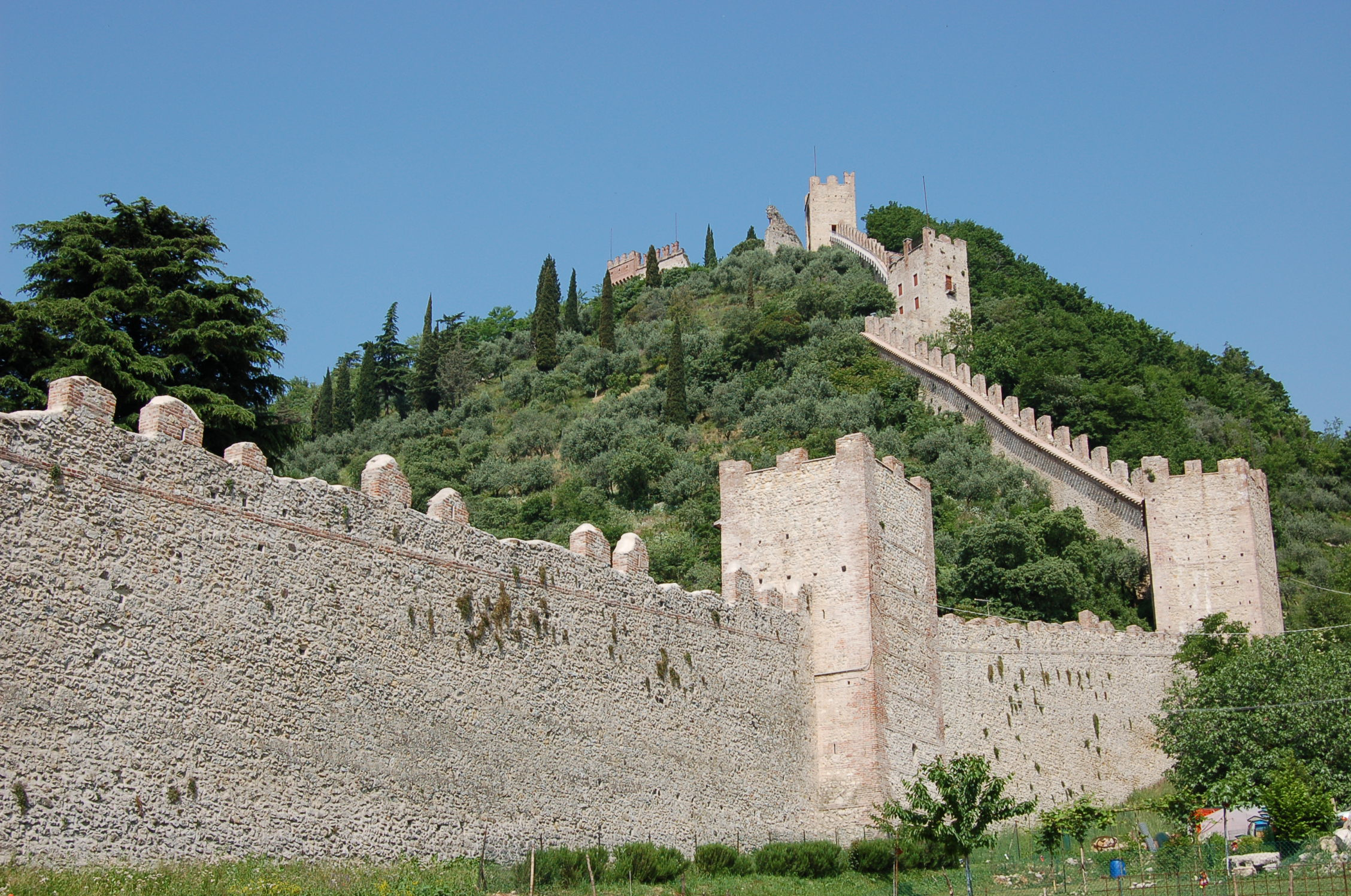
Walls of the upper castle

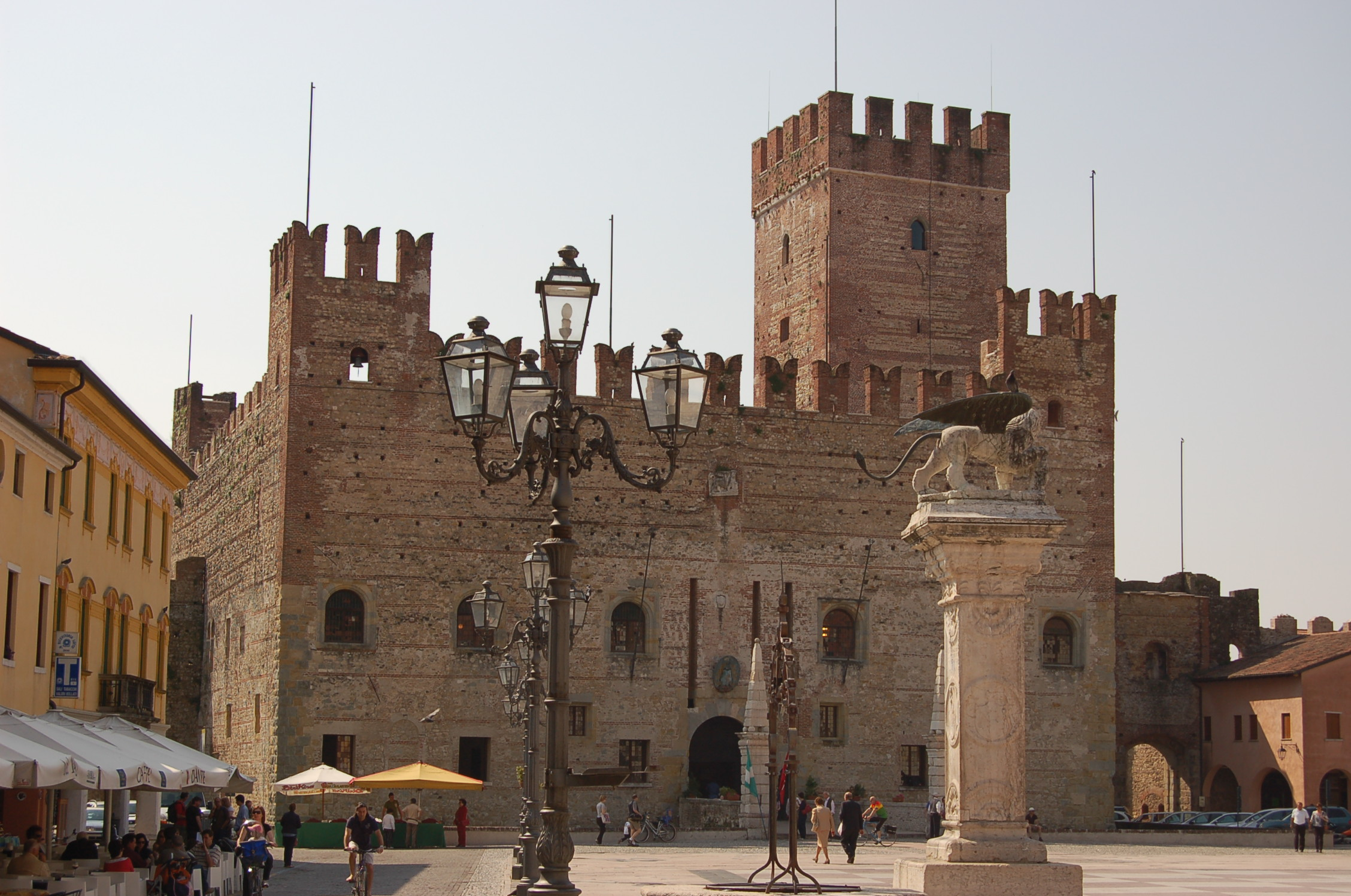
The lower castle and the Lion of Saint Mark
