= Callisto series =

Novel series by Lin Carter

Jandar of Callisto by Lin Carter, Dell Books, 1972

The Callisto series is a sequence of eight science fiction novels by Lin Carter, of the sword and planet subgenre, first published by Dell Books from 1972-1978. They were written in homage to the Barsoom and Amtor novels of Edgar Rice Burroughs.

== Volumes ==
1. Jandar of Callisto (1972)
2. Black Legion of Callisto (1972)
3. Sky Pirates of Callisto (1973)
4. Mad Empress of Callisto (1975)
5. Mind Wizards of Callisto (1975)
6. Lankar of Callisto (1975)
7. Ylana of Callisto (1977)
8. Renegade of Callisto (1978)
  Callisto Volume 1 (2000 - omnibus including Jandar of Callisto and Black Legion of Callisto)

== Setting ==
Map of "Thanator, the Jungle Moon" by Lin Carter

Callisto is presented as having an Earthlike, even tropical environment, capable of supporting human and other life. An unexplained illusion makes the moon appear an airless, lifeless orb to outside observers. The moon is tidally locked to Jupiter, always presenting the same face to its mother planet. Callisto's known civilized area is limited to this side of the moon. The unknown outer hemisphere, partially explored in some of the later books, holds the stronghold of the hostile Mind Wizards.

Physically, Callisto's inner hemisphere, illuminated by Jupiter, is lushly vegetated, its land surface covered mostly by jungle and plain which drain into two seas, one large and one small. A number of inhabited cities of largely pre-technological culture are known. Visited portions of the darker outer hemisphere are barren and mountainous.

== Storyline ==
American soldier and helicopter pilot Jonathan Dark crashes in Cambodia near the ruins of the lost city of Arangkhôr. Exploring the ruins at night, he discovers a well-like structure at the center that teleports him to Callisto, one of the moons of Jupiter – or Thanator, as the moon is known to its inhabitants. There he encounters a human civilization originally linked to that of ancient Cambodia via the well. The inhabitants render his unfamiliar name as "Jandar." On Callisto, Jandar contends with monstrous creatures, savage insect men, barbarian hordes, sky pirates in flying ships, and the dangerous Mind Wizards of Kuur while seeking to rescue and win the heart of the beautiful princess Darloona of Shondakar (a homage to the similarly named Martian lost city in Leigh Brackett's The Last Days of Shandakor).

The texts of the first five volumes of the series are ostensibly transcripts of first-person narratives by Jonathan Dark recounting his adventures, written with native materials and transported back to Earth via the well. These come into the hands of Lin Carter, who "edits" them for publication. In the sixth novel, Carter himself visits Arangkhôr, falls into the well, and experiences a Callistan adventure as "Lankar." The remaining volumes, again purportedly by Dark, recount the stories of other protagonists. The chess-like Callistan game of Darza, depicted in Renegade of Callisto, was inspired by Edgar Rice Burroughs’ Barsoomian game of Jetan, or Martian Chess.

== Reception ==
Reviewing the first three volumes, Lester del Rey found the series to be "fairly entertaining reading," but noted that Carter had "copied every trick of Burroughs, including those that are faults."

According to Den Valdron, assessing the series in ERBzine, "it reads as inferior Barsoom," though he calls the first three volumes "quite good," noting that "[t]he world and the hero are fairly vivid, [and] the action moves quickly. It's hardly deep, but it is fun." On the down side, he views Jandar as "kind of an arrogant jerk ... a bit of an egotist ... constantly getting into trouble with half baked plans [from which he] is regularly rescued by his friends or saved by dumb luck." Valdron also criticizes the relationship of the hero and heroine, between whom he detects no chemistry. He rates the next two books, Sky Pirates and Mind Wizards, as "high points" among the Callisto books, praising them as "rousing, fast paced adventures ... filled with genuine tension and strangeness." Mind Wizards in particular he calls "one of the best, or better of the Callisto books, with enough novelty and action, and genuine sexiness to keep things fresh all the way," though noting "for the record, not a single damned Mind Wizard actually shows up anywhere in this book." He finds "the cliff hanger ending as Jon Dark conceals his notes even as his pursuers close in on him ... genuinely gripping." But he dismisses Lankar, the follow-up book, as "an odd novel, more travelogue than adventure, and Carter's constant references to other works of fiction [as] a bit annoying ... [suggesting] a painful lack of imagination." He finds the plot and action thin, and the author an inadequate action hero, nothing that "the 'dog' that adopts him does practically all the work." His ultimate judgment is that it "is frankly embarrassing to read, what with its endless references to others' works, the obvious self consciousness and 'tweeness' of the author, and the fact that just about everything interesting happens offstage and to other people. It's an interesting conceit, but sadly it fails." The next is "better," with Carter making "a real effort to keep the pages turning," but with "nothing new and nothing remarkable, [and] the plot ... thin with complications literally shoehorned in." Renegade he views as "somewhat of a recovery" from the previous two weak entries, and finds it "acceptable, even good."

== Unwritten sequels ==
In his introduction to Callisto, Volume I (2001), the ebook edition of the first two Callisto novels, John Gregory Betancourt, adopting Carter's teasing pretense that the books represent the true memoirs of protagonist Jonathan Dark, alleges the existence of further Dark manuscripts, including one titled The Ice Kingdom of Callisto, left in the hands of Carter's literary executor, Robert M. Price. Price himself notes elsewhere that Carter actually projected seven additional volumes in the series with the working titles Sword-Master of Callisto, Xara of Callisto, Warrior Girl of Callisto, Ice Kingdom of Callisto, Kaldar of Callisto, Lost Prince of Callisto, and Zamara of Callisto. He gives no indication any of these were actually written, however, or even plotted in any detail past Sword-Master.
