= Tolkien: A Look Behind The Lord of the Rings =

1969 literary criticism by Lin Carter

- Author: Lin Carter
- Language: English
- Genre: Literary criticism
- Publisher: Ballantine Books
- Publication date: 1969
- Publication place: United States
- Pages: 211 pp.
- Followed by: Lovecraft: A Look Behind the "Cthulhu Mythos"

Tolkien: A Look Behind The Lord of the Rings, alternatively subtitled A joyous exploration of Tolkien's classic trilogy and of the glorious tradition from which it grew is a 1969 non-scholarly study of the works of J. R. R. Tolkien by the science fiction author Lin Carter. The original version of the book was among the earliest full-length critical works devoted to Tolkien's fantasies, and the first to attempt to set his writings in the context of the history of fantasy.

The book was poorly received by scholars. The J. R. R. Tolkien Encyclopedia calls the study "the first worthwhile book on Tolkien", with the proviso that Carter's lack of scholarly training resulted in insufficient rigor and numerous errors. Jared Lobdell in National Review calls it "pleasant but not very rewarding", noting inaccuracies and lack of expertise. Sandra Miesel in the Tolkien Journal finds the work excessively long with much irrelevant material, ill-informed, ineptly written and insensitive to Tolkien's themes.

== Outline ==
Lin Carter's study was intended to serve as an introduction to Tolkien for those unfamiliar with his work. His introduction briefly reviews the publishing phenomenon of The Lord of the Rings and its burgeoning popularity in the wake of the first paperback editions in the 1960s, after which he devotes three chapters to a short biography of the author through the late 1960s, including an account of how The Lord of the Rings was written.

Four chapters follow explaining Tolkien's invented Middle-earth and summarizing the stories of The Hobbit and The Lord of the Rings. Carter next turns to the question of what the works are. The then-current vogue for realistic fiction provided critics with few tools for evaluating an out-and-out fantasy on its own terms, and attempts were rife to deconstruct it as a satire or allegory. Carter debunks these efforts, citing Tolkien's essay "On Fairy-Stories" on the functions and purposes of fantasy.

Carter then contextualizes Tolkien's works by broadly sketching the history of written fantasy from its earliest appearance in the epic poetry of the ancient world through the heroic poetry of the Dark Ages and the prose romances of the medieval era, down to the fairy tales, ghost stories and gothic novels of the modern era and the rediscovery of the genre by writers of the 19th and 20th centuries, prior to and contemporary with Tolkien. The origins of the modern genre are traced to the writings of William Morris, Lord Dunsany and E. R. Eddison, and followed through the works of authors they influenced, including H. P. Lovecraft, Fletcher Pratt, L. Sprague de Camp, and Mervyn Peake. Carter next highlights some of Tolkien's particular debts to his predecessors, early and modern, tracing the motifs and names he utilizes to their beginnings in Norse mythology, and highlighting other echoes in his work from legend and history.

A "Postscript" features Tolkien's influence on contemporary fantasy, which was evident in the 1960s, primarily in children's books by Carol Kendall, Alan Garner, and Lloyd Alexander.

An updated 2003 edition includes material on Peter Jackson's film adaptation of The Lord of the Rings in the introduction, covers the story of The Silmarillion in the chapter "Tolkien Today", and expands the postscript "After Tolkien" on recent fantasy writers.

== Publication history ==
Tolkien: A Look Behind The Lord of the Rings was first published in paperback by Ballantine Books in March 1969 and reprinted in April 1969, April 1970, July 1971, July 1972, February 1973, July 1973, June 1975 and November 1977, after which it went out of print for over twenty-five years. The book has been translated into French, Japanese, and Polish. A new edition updated by Adam Roberts was published by Gollancz in August 2003; it constituted both the first British edition and first hardcover edition. The first American hardcover edition was published by Tor Books in 2004.

== Reception ==
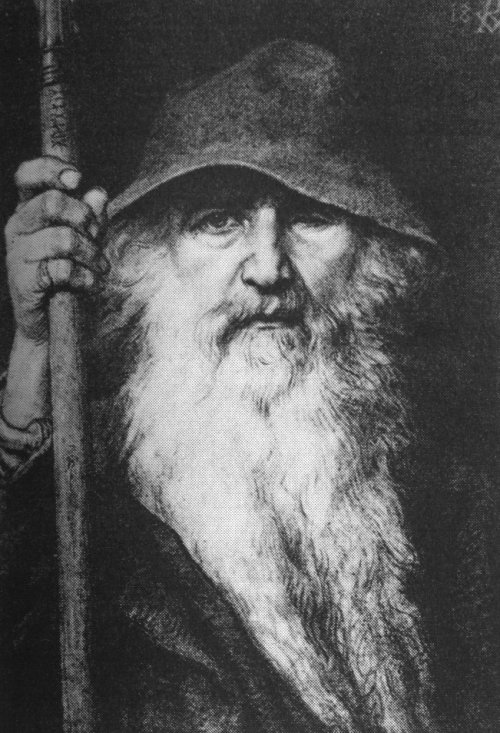
Carter identified Gandalf as resembling the Norse god Odin, a point criticised at the time, but accepted by later scholars. Painting Odin, the Wanderer by Georg von Rosen, 1886

Richard C. West, writing in the J.R.R. Tolkien Encyclopedia, comments that Tolkien: A Look Behind The Lord of the Rings was "the first worthwhile book on Tolkien". He adds that Carter's "enthusiasm is infectious"; he stated that Carter had read widely in ancient and modern literature, and that the book surveyed many of the works that influenced Tolkien. The medievalist Sandra Miesel, in the Tolkien Journal finds Carter's identification of Gandalf with Odin "strained", but Tolkien had stated that he thought of Gandalf as an "Odinic wanderer", and later scholars such as Marjorie Burns have agreed about the resemblance. The scholar of the Inklings, Jared Lobdell, writing in National Review, calls the study a "pleasant but not very rewarding book", though "not the worst book to be written on the subject." He feels that Carter is at least relevant when he writes about Tolkien himself, or when he describes how he came across the list of names of the dwarves in the Poetic Edda.

West writes that Carter lacked "the scholarly training" to explore the influences on Tolkien "with sufficient rigor"; in his view, the book had "many factual errors throughout". Miesel describes Carter as "an inept amateur scholar" and "invincibly ignorant" of mythology, failing to do justice to Tolkien's Celtic or Arthurian influences; she finds "damning" his failure to mention the Matter of Britain. Further, in her view Carter is insensitive to Tolkien's many themes, such as quests, plants, and "nostalgia for paradise". She finds his analysis of the heroes in The Lord of the Rings as archetypes no better. Miesel finds the prose poor and padded with irrelevant "synopses of other fantasies". She adds that what he writes about fantasy in the ancient, medieval, and modern eras combines irrelevance with "questionable interpretations". She finds errors, too: Carter incorrectly claims that El Cid died in battle, and that Roland died fighting Moors (it was Christian Basques). In her view, the chapters tracing names and story elements in The Lord of the Rings to Norse mythology are "the most interesting", though she questions some of the parallels and derivations. Miesel concludes that the book is "superficial, inadequate, and clumsy." Lobdell states that when Carter attempts to cover the history of fantasy, "he seems to be walking on unfamiliar ground—not to mention ground rather far distant from Middle-Earth—and the value of what he has to say is questionable." Still, Lobdell notes, "it is probably a good thing to be reminded that others besides the master have tried their hand at heroic fantasy." He finds Carter's philology "clearly inexpert" where not "demonstrably inaccurate," and suspected that the book was "rushed into print to take advantage of the current Tolkien mania." Nicholas Whyte comments on the 2003 update that Roberts "sensibly" did not try too hard to remedy the book's failings, adding a Silmarillion chapter and a bit on recent fantasy.
