= Air pirate =

Type of stock character from science fiction and fantasy

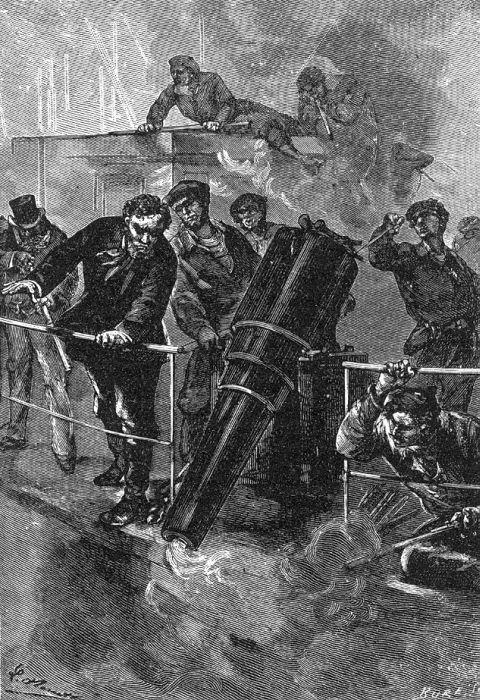
Airship crew in Jules Verne's Robur the Conqueror

Air pirates (or sky pirates) are a class of stock character from science fiction and fantasy. The characters are pirates who use aircraft or airborne aircraft carriers as their primary vehicles instead of ships. They target other aircraft for looting. This character type was introduced in aviation-themed novels of the late 19th century.

== Description ==
Such characters typically operate as pirates in the air, or, in general, the atmosphere of a planet, dwarf planet or moon, and travel by aircraft, as opposed to the more traditional pirates on the high seas, who travel by ship. However, just as traditional seafaring pirates target sailing ships, air pirates serve a similar role in science fiction and fantasy media: they capture and plunder aircraft and other targets for cargo, loot and occasionally steal an entire aircraft, sometimes killing the crew members in the process.

Their dress and speech may vary; it may correspond to the particular author's vision of the story's setting, rather than their seafaring counterparts, or they may be modeled after stereotypical sea pirates. Some air pirates are depicted using airborne aircraft carriers as mobile bases from which to conduct raids.

Air pirates made early appearances in novels of the late 19th century, as well as silent films, comics and pulp magazines, and have since appeared in a variety of media, including alternate history, steampunk, and dieselpunk works.

== In popular culture ==
Names	Work	Years	Type of Media	Description
Abney Park	Airship Pirates Chronicles	2011	Role-playing game	This game, based on the backstory of the band Abney Park, is set in the post-apocalyptic world after their album, The End Of Days, a future world with a disrupted timeline, featuring steampunk themes and Victorian-era style. Players are air pirates in command of their own steam-powered airships, who seek to pillage the skies and plunder history, possibly causing even greater disruption to the past. Meanwhile, the world below struggles in Victorian-style squalor under an oppressive government that maintains control through clockwork policemen. In December 2011, the RPG game won Diehard GameFAN's "Best Core Rulebook of 2011" award.
Barney Baxter	Barney Baxter in the Air	1935–1950	Comic strip	Barney Baxter was an "adventure strip" involving heroic exploits centering on aviation. Baxter was often accompanied by his sidekick Gopher Gus, who (unlike the rest of the characters) was drawn with the exaggerated facial features of a "humour strip" character. Other characters were Barney's mother, his rival love interests, Patricia and Maura, and his buddy Hap Walters.
Blackbeard	Pan	2015	Film	Blackbeard leads a group of pirates in this 2015 fantasy film who use flying sailing ships.
Black Cat Gang	Tail Concerto	1998–1999	Video game	The Black Cat Gang in this video game are sky pirates, while many other sky pirate factions appear in its sequel Solatorobo: Red the Hunter in 2011.
Kasey Boon	Mysticons	2017–2018	Animated TV series	Younger brother of Kitty, who Emerald Goldenbraid, one of the story's protagonists, developed a crush on. He gave her a bracelet which was revealed to be a tracking device to follow the Mysticons. He later appears to have second thoughts about taking advantage of Em's feelings for him, and catches her, after which the two have a serious romance. In the comics, he debuts in Volume 2.
Kitty Boon	Mysticons	2017–2018	Animated TV series	Captain of the Pink Skulls, female pirate, and Zarya's childhood friend. She takes advantage of this relationship to incapacitate the Mysticons and obtain the Dragon Disk, which she sells to Dreadbane. She later fights alongside the Mysticons, and on a third occasion gives Zarya inspiration to thwart Necrafa's plans. She is later revealed to be Zarya's romantic love interest as confirmed by the show's creator, Sean Jara, and supported by show director Matt Ferguson. In the comic books, she debuts in Volume 2.
Captain Andian Cly	Boneshaker	2009	Novel	This 2009 novel by Cherie Priest features air pirates like captain Cly, who commands a ship called the Naamah Darling and later appears in novels like Ganymede, where he loves a woman in the Seattle Underground.
Dola	Castle in the Sky	1986	Studio Ghibli anime film	A “bold, plump old lady named Dola leads a gang of air pirates in this 1986 Japanese anime film as they try to steal the crystal necklace of Sheeta.”
Captain Gyrfalcon	Exalted	2001	Role playing game	Gyrfalcon appeared in this high fantasy role playing game.
Prince James; Other "social revolutionaries"	The Raid of the Mercury	1931	Short story	James committed an act of air piracy, with fellow "social revolutionaries," in this short story by A. H. Johnson.
Don Karnage	TaleSpin	1990–1991, 2018–2021	Disney animated TV series	Karnage leads a gang of air pirates in this Disney animated series (and later in DuckTales). According to series creator Jymn Magon, he is a wolf, but has orangish-brown fur reminiscent of a fox.
Alexandre LeRoi	Batman: Master of the Future	1991	Graphic novel	LeRoi is a sky pirate who is flamboyant and demands that he be proclaimed master of the city, or else he will burn it to the ground. He leaps out the window before he can be arrested, and Tolliver insists that the fair proceed.
Miles Lydecker	Black Condor Vol 1 #2	1992	Comics	Lyndecker is another DC Comics air pirate who fought against Black Condor in the 1992 comic Black Condor Vol 1 #2.
Mamma Aiuto Gang	Porco Rosso	1992	Anime film	Mamma Aiuto Gang, among the air pirates in this anime film, who also appeared in the 1989 manga Hikōtei Jidai on which the film was based.
Captain Mors	The Air Pirate and His Steerable Airship	1908–1911	Pulp Magazine	The German pulp magazine The Air Pirate and His Steerable Airship from 1908 to 1911, followed the adventures of Captain Mors, the "Air pirate".
Nadakhan	Ninjago: Masters of Spinjitzu	2016	Animated TV series	Nadakhan and his band of sky pirates are the main antagonists of the sixth season of this series, titled Skybound.
Captain Plunder his Sky Pirates	Sonic the Comic	1993–2002	Comic	Plunder and fellow sky pirates appear in this comic.
Captain Phoenix	Jak and Daxter: The Lost Frontier	2009	Video game	Phoenix leads a gang of space pirates, like Danger Sexy Pirate, in massive ships who battle the protagonists while having a flying airbase known as Phoenix.
Robur	Robur the Conqueror	1886; 1904	Novel	He is an inventor who kidnaps people and takes them aboard his advanced aircraft in the 1886 novel Robur the Conqueror and its 1904 sequel Master of the World (both written by Jules Verne), as well as in the 1961 film adaptation based on elements of both novels.
Captain Shakespeare	Stardust	2007	Film	Shakespeare leads aerial pirates in this fantasy film, commanding a ship called the Caspartine.
Silvana crew	Last Exile	2003	Anime series	The crew of the airship Silvana in the anime series Last Exile are sky pirates, while sky pirates appear in the sequel series Last Exile: Fam the Silver Wing.
Baroness Troixmonde / Filibus	Filibus	1915	Silent film	The film's protagonist has a secret identity and is known to the world as Filibus and has an airship. Some called the film "an odd and funny forerunner of science-fiction movies," with Filibus described as a lesbian character, and an "elegant and elusive woman pirate" who can pass between male and female identities, making her "a champion of transgenderism before that term had been coined."
Unnamed	The Sky Police	1910	Short story	This short story by John A. Heffernan features an air pirate.
Unnamed	Pirates of 1920	1911	Silent film	Air pirates appeared in the 1911 silent film Pirates of 1920.
Unnamed	The Pirates of the Sky: A Tale of Modern Adventure	1915	Novel	Sky pirates appear in Stephen Gaillard's 1915 novel, The Pirates of the Sky: A Tale of Modern Adventure.
Unnamed	Sky Pirates of Callisto	1973	Novels	There are sky pirates in the Callisto series of novels.
Unnamed	The Last of the Sky Pirates	2002	Books	Several characters in Edge Chronicles books are sky pirates. The book has been commended for the way it portrays librarians.
Unnamed	Crimson Skies	2000–2003	Game franchise	The series is set within an alternate history of the 1930s invented by Weisman and McCoy. Within this divergent timeline, the United States has collapsed, and air travel has become the most popular mode of transportation in North America; as a result, air pirates thrive in the world of Crimson Skies. In describing the concept of Crimson Skies, Jordan Weisman stated he wanted to "take the idea of 16th century Caribbean piracy and translate into a 1930s American setting".
Unnamed	Pirate101	2012	Video game	Players can complete quests, sail ships, befriend companions, and battle enemies in a turn-based combat system similar to that used in board games.
Unnamed	Mandrake the Magician	1934–2013	Comic strip	Mandrake, along with the Phantom Magician in Mel Graff's The Adventures of Patsy, is regarded by comics historians as the first superhero of comics, such as comics historian Don Markstein, who writes, "Some people say Mandrake the Magician, who started in 1934, was comics' first superhero." A story arc in the Mandrake the Magician comic strip involved a pirate airplane that would latch on to the outside of a passenger jet and then threaten to punch holes through the fuselage (with remote-controlled hammers) if the victims did not follow orders and land at an airstrip where the pirates could loot their prey.
Unnamed	The Magnificent Kotobuki	2019	Anime series	The anime's protagonists run escorts to fend off attacks from air pirates.
Vaan; Balthier	Final Fantasy	1987-Present	Media franchise	The sky pirates of the Final Fantasy media franchise include Vaan and Balthier. For Balthier, he eventually decided to cut his ties with his father and his role as a judge, becoming a sky pirate under a new name, abandoning his old name. For Vaan, he ends the game, Final Fantasy XII, as a sky pirate, traveling the world along with Penelo. He also reprises his role from Final Fantasy XII in the manga adaptation by Gin Amou.
Vyse; Gilder; Enrique	Skies of Arcadia	2000–2003	Video game	In this video game, Vyse is a young and dashing sky pirate who is part of the Blue Rogues clan and soon become entangled in a race to find the Moon Stones that control these powerful Gigas. Other sky pirates include Gilder and Enrique.

== In reality ==
In real-life use, the phrase "air piracy" more often refers to the hijacking and illegal seizure of an aircraft. However, there has been at least one occasion of an act of nautical-type ship capture being conducted from the air. This occurred in 1917, when the civilian Norwegian schooner Royal was boarded and captured by a boarding party from the German Zeppelin L23. However, the Royal was carrying contraband material in violation of neutrality, thus her capture and confiscation was legal.

There have also been a handful of instances where interceptor aircraft have threatened an airliner or cargo plane, forcing it to land, including cases like Ryanair Flight 4978 where the flight of the airliner was legal and approved; Irish prime minister Micheál Martin referred to the Ryanair incident as "piracy in the skies." In the notorious Airstan incident, an Ilyushin Il-76 shipping weapons to the besieged government of Afghanistan was attacked and forced to land by a Taliban-flown jet fighter. The cargo plane's crew spent a year in captivity before escaping.

== See also ==
- Pilot in command – Flight crew role
- First officer (aviation) – Flight crew role
- Outlaw (stock character) – Stock character in several fictional settings
- Space pirate – Science fiction character trope
- List of space pirates – Science fiction character trope of space, rather than seafaring pirate
