= Vincent Di Fate =

American science fiction, fantasy, and realistic space art artist

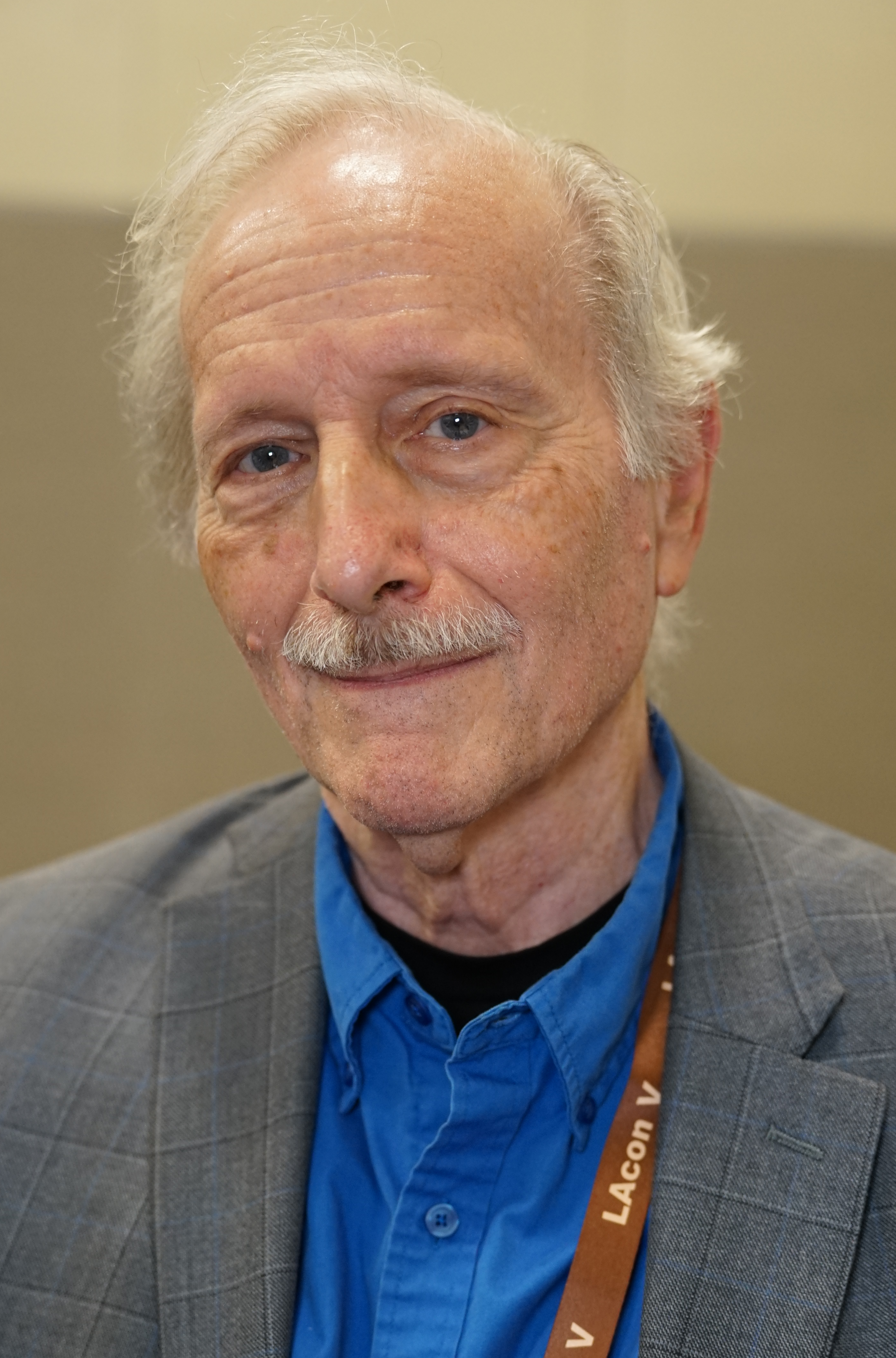
Di Fate at Worldcon 2026

Vincent Di Fate (born November 21, 1945) is an American artist specializing in science fiction, fantasy and realistic space art (hardware art) illustration. He was inducted by the Science Fiction Hall of Fame on June 25, 2011.

== Career ==
Di Fate was born November 21, 1945, in Yonkers, New York, to Victor and Carmina (née Sgueglia) Di Fate. He married Roseanne Panaro on March 10, 1968.

He studied at the Phoenix School of Design in New York City and received his MA in Illustration at Syracuse University.

He broke into speculative fiction pulp magazines with illustrations for three different stories in the August 1969 issue of Analog Science Fiction/Science Fact, edited by John W. Campbell, and did his first cover illustration for the November issue.

Di Fate calls his 1997 book Infinite Worlds "the first comprehensive history of science fiction art in America".

== Awards ==
Cover art for Broke Down Engine (and Other Troubles with Machines) by Ron Goulart, 1969

Di Fate won the Hugo Award for Best Professional Artist at the 1979 World Science Fiction Convention (for 1978 work) and was nominated ten times from 1972 to 1985.

For his lifetime contributions he won the Edward E. Smith Memorial Award for Imaginative Fiction (the Skylark) from the New England Science Fiction Association in 1987 and the Chesley Award from the fantasy and science fiction artists in 1998.

He also won the Frank R. Paul Award for Outstanding Achievement in Science Fiction Illustration (1978) and the Lensman Award for lifetime contribution in 1990 and he was a Guest of Honor at the 1992 Worldcon.

He won the Rondo at the 2003 Rondo Hatton Classic Horror Awards for his work on the Monster-Mania Convention Program Cover.

Infinite Worlds won the Locus Award for Best Illustrated and Art Book in 1998.

== Books ==
- Di Fate's Catalog of Science Fiction Hardware (Workman Publishing Co, 1980), Di Fate and Ian Summers ISBN 0-89480-127-9/0-89480-126-0 (pbk.)
- Infinite Worlds: The Fantastic Visions of Science Fiction Art (Penguin, 1997) ISBN 0-670-87252-0
- The Science Fiction Art of Vincent Di Fate (Paper Tiger, 2002) ISBN 1-85585-949-1

Infinite Worlds won the annual Art Book Locus Award.
