= Lin Carter =

American fantasy writer, editor, poet and critic

- Carter c. 1975
- Born: Linwood Vrooman Carter; June 9, 1930; St. Petersburg, Florida, US
- Died: February 7, 1988 (aged 57); Montclair, New Jersey, US
- Education: Columbia University
- Occupations: Writer; editor; critic
- Spouses: Judith McQuown (divorced) Noël Vreeland (m. 1964, divorced)
- Writing career
- Period: 1965–1988
- Genres: Fantasy, science fiction
- Subject: High fantasy (as critic)
- Notable work: Imaginary Worlds

Linwood Vrooman Carter (June 9, 1930 – February 7, 1988) was an American author of science fiction and fantasy, as well as an editor and critic. He usually wrote as Lin Carter; known pseudonyms include H. P. Lowcraft (for an H. P. Lovecraft parody) and Grail Undwin. In the 1970s he was editor of the Ballantine Adult Fantasy series, which introduced readers to many overlooked classics of the fantasy genre.

== Life ==
Carter was born in St. Petersburg, Florida. He was an avid reader of science fiction and fantasy in his youth, and became broadly knowledgeable in both fields. He was also active in fandom.

Carter served in the United States Army (infantry, Korea, 1951–53), and then attended Columbia University and took part in Leonie Adams's Poetry Workshop (1953–54). He was an advertising and publishers' copywriter from 1957 until 1969, when he took up writing full-time. He was also an editorial consultant. During much of his writing career he lived in Hollis, New York.

Carter was married twice, first to Judith Ellen Hershkovitz (married 1959, divorced 1960) and second to Noel Vreeland (married 1963, when they were both working for the publisher Prentice-Hall; divorced 1975).

Carter was a member of the Trap Door Spiders, an all-male literary banqueting club which served as the basis of Isaac Asimov's fictional group of mystery-solvers, the Black Widowers. Carter was the model for Asimov's character Mario Gonzalo. Carter was also a member of the Swordsmen and Sorcerers' Guild of America (SAGA), a loose-knit group of Heroic fantasy authors founded in the 1960s, some of whose work he anthologized in the Flashing Swords! series.

In the 1970s Carter published one issue of his own fantasy fanzine Kadath, named after H. P. Lovecraft's fictional setting (see The Dream-Quest of Unknown Kadath). About 3,000 copies were printed; however, the printer was in a dispute with the binder, who held the copies. While Carter paid the printer, the printer decamped to California. When Carter went to see the binder, he was told that the copies had been kept for a while, but then most had been thrown out. Carter believed that only about 30 copies of the issue survived. It contained Carter's Cthulhu Mythos story "The City of Pillars" (pp. 22–25).

Carter resided in East Orange, New Jersey, in his later years, and drank and smoked heavily. It was probably smoking that gave him oral cancer in 1985. Only his status as a Korean War veteran enabled him to receive extensive surgery. However, it failed to cure the cancer and left him disfigured.

Carter held gatherings of writers under the aegis of 'the New Kalem Club' (in tribute to the original Kalem Club) - meetings which were attended by Robert M. Price, S. T. Joshi, Peter Cannon and others, including occasionally Frank Belknap Long.

In the last year before his death, he had begun to reappear in print with a new book in his Terra Magica series, a long-promised Prince Zarkon pulp hero pastiche, Horror Wears Blue, and a regular column for the magazine Crypt of Cthulhu.

== Writing career ==
A longtime science fiction and fantasy fan, Carter first appeared in print with letters to Startling Stories and other pulp magazines in 1943 and again in the late 1940s. He issued two volumes of fantasy verse, Sandalwood and Jade (1951), technically his first book, and Galleon of Dream (1955) (see Poetry in Bibliography below) His first professional publication was the short story "Masters of the Metropolis", co-written with Randall Garrett, and published by Anthony Boucher in The Magazine of Fantasy and Science Fiction, April 1957. Another early collaborative story, "The Slitherer from the Slime" (Inside SF, September 1958), by Carter, as "H. P. Lowcraft", with Dave Foley, is a parody of H. P. Lovecraft. The story "Uncollected Works" (Fantasy and SF, March 1965) was a finalist for the annual Nebula Award for Best Short Story, from the SF and fantasy writers, the only time Carter was a runner-up for a major award.

Early in his efforts to establish himself as a writer, Carter gained a mentor in L. Sprague de Camp, who critiqued his novel The Wizard of Lemuria in manuscript. The seventh novel Carter wrote, it was the first to find a publisher, appearing from Ace Books in March 1965. Due in large part to their later collaborations, mutual promotion of each other in print, joint membership in both the Trap Door Spiders and SAGA, and complementary scholarly efforts to document the history of fantasy, de Camp is the person with whom Carter is most closely associated as a writer. A falling-out in the last decade of Carter's life did not become generally known until after his death.

Carter was a prolific writer, producing an average of six books a year from 1965 to 1969. (Note: For 1965 to 1969 inclusive, ISFDB catalogs at least five Thongor novels and nine others, three anthologies, four Howard books (posthumous collaboration with Howard, three by Carter and de Camp), and the Tolkien study.) He also wrote a nearly monthly column, "Our Man in Fandom", in If, edited by Frederik Pohl, and was a major writer on ABC's original Spider-Man animated TV show during its fantasy-oriented second season in 1968–69.

Carter frequently cited his own writings in his non-fiction and almost always included at least one of his own pieces in each of the anthologies he edited. The most extreme instance of his penchant for self-promotion is in the sixth novel in his Callisto sequence, Lankar of Callisto, which features Carter himself as the protagonist.

Carter was not reluctant to attack organized religion in his books, including in his unfinished World's End, in "Amalric the Man-God" (also unfinished), and in The Wizard of Zao. He portrayed religions as cruel and repressive, and had his heroes escape from their inquisitions.

In most of his fiction, Carter was consciously imitative of the themes, subjects and styles of authors he admired. He usually identified his models in the introductions or afterwords of his novels, as well as in the introductory notes to self-anthologized or collected short stories. His best-known works are his sword and planet and sword and sorcery novels in the tradition of Edgar Rice Burroughs, Robert E. Howard, and James Branch Cabell. His first published book, The Wizard of Lemuria (1965), first of the "Thongor the Barbarian" series, combines both influences. Although he wrote only six Thongor novels, the character appeared in Marvel Comics's Creatures on the Loose for an eight-issue run in 1973–74 and was often optioned for films, although none has been produced. His other major series, the "Callisto" and "Zanthodon" books, are direct tributes to Burroughs' Barsoom series and Pellucidar novels, respectively. Because of his imitative tendencies, Carter is not always regarded with critical favour. David Pringle's The Ultimate Encyclopedia of Fantasy, for instance, remarks that "As a writer Lin Carter specialized in derivative hackwork of no conspicuous merit..." though acknowledging "he was enormously influential as an editor, playing a key role in the establishment of fantasy as a popular genre."

In other works Carter paid homage to the styles of contemporary pulp magazine authors or their precursors. Some of these, together with Carter's models, include his "Simrana" stories (influenced by Lord Dunsany), his horror stories (set in the "Cthulhu Mythos" of H. P. Lovecraft), his "Green Star" novels (uniting influences from Clark Ashton Smith and Edgar Rice Burroughs), his "Mysteries of Mars" series (patterned on the works of Leigh Brackett), and his "Prince Zarkon" books (based on the "Doc Savage" series of Kenneth Robeson). Later in his career Carter assimilated influences from mythology and fairy tales, and even branched out briefly into pornographic fantasy.

== Posthumous collaborations with Howard and Smith ==
Carter also produced what he referred to as "posthumous collaborations" with deceased authors, such as Robert E. Howard and Clark Ashton Smith. He completed a number of Howard's unfinished tales of Kull (see Kull (collection)) and Conan the Barbarian, the latter often in collaboration with L. Sprague de Camp. He also collaborated with de Camp on a number of pastiche novels and short stories featuring Conan.

Few had escaped the holocaust of inconceivable cold that blew ravening down the boreal Pole...

— Lin Carter, The Acolyte of the Flame from The Book of Eibon

The "posthumous collaborations" with Smith were of a different order, usually completely new stories built around title ideas or short fragments found among Smith's notes and jottings. A number of these tales feature Smith's invented book of forbidden lore, the Book of Eibon (Cthulhu Mythos arcane literature). Some of them also overlap as pastiches of H.P. Lovecraft's work by utilising elements of Lovecraft's Cthulhu Mythos. These stories are uncollected. For further information see Steve Behrends, "The Carter-Smith Collaborations" in Robert M. Price (ed). The Horror of it All: Encrusted Gems from the Crypt of Cthulhu. See also Lin Carter deities.

== Pastiches of H. P. Lovecraft and Lord Dunsany ==
Carter wrote numerous stories in the Cthulhu Mythos of H. P. Lovecraft. Many have been collected in The Xothic Legend Cycle: The Complete Mythos Fiction of Lin Carter, edited by Robert M. Price. Despite the title, there are many uncollected Mythos stories by Carter. See also Xothic legend cycle. For further info see Robert M. Price "The Statement of Lin Carter", Crypt of Cthulhu 1, No 2 (Yuletide 1981), 11–19.

Carter wrote two cycles of stories set in "dreamlands", paying tribute to the fantasy of Lord Dunsany, Ikranos, from his fan days, and Simrana, after he became a professional writer.

== Later life and death ==
Carter was in declining health for several years in the 1980s. He suffered from cancer from a heavy smoking habit, which led to facial disfigurement. The subsequent failure of an experimental prosthesis forced Carter to become a hermit. But in 1987 he had begun to reappear in print with a new book in his Terra Magica series, a long-promised Prince Zarkon pulp hero pastiche, Horror Wears Blue, and a regular column for Crypt of Cthulhu. DAW published his latest fantasy, Callipygia, in Feb 1988. Despite these successes, Carter increased his alcohol intake, becoming an alcoholic.

His cancer resurfaced, spreading to his throat and leading to his death in Montclair, New Jersey. The cancer was not the cause of Carter's death, however. He had developed emphysema, and experienced severe breathing problems the day he died. Rushed to a hospital, he went into cardiac arrest, was revived by doctors, but subsequently had a second, fatal heart attack.

Robert M. Price, named in Carter's will as his literary executor and the editor of Crypt of Cthulhu, who had published a Lin Carter special issue (Vol. 5, No 2, whole number 36, Yuletide 1985), was about to send an all-Lin Carter issue of Crypt of Cthulhu to press when word of the writer's death came. It was immediately turned into a memorial issue. The memorial issue was Crypt of Cthulhu Vol. 7, No 4, whole number 54, (Eastertide 1988). Two further issues of the magazine were devoted to Carter alone (see References below).

== Unfinished projects ==
Carter left a number of projects unfinished. He regularly announced plans for future works that never came to fruition, even including some among lists of other works printed in the fronts of his books. His 1976 anthologies Kingdoms of Sorcery and Realms of Wizardry both included such phantom books among his other listed works, titled Robert E. Howard and the Rise of Sword & Sorcery, The Stones of Mnar and Jungle Maid of Callisto. The first of these, presumably a non-fiction study along the lines of his Tolkien: A Look Behind "The Lord of the Rings" (1969), never saw print; the second seems to be related to The Terror Out of Time, a collection of Cthulhu Mythos tales he had pitched unsuccessfully to Arkham House (the existing material for which was eventually gathered into his The Xothic Legend Cycle (1997)); the third was apparently a working title for Ylana of Callisto (1977), published the year after the anthologies.

Several of his series were abandoned due to lack of publisher or reader interest or to his deteriorating health. Among these are his "Thongor" series, to which he intended to add two books dealing with the hero's youth; only a scattering of short stories intended for the volumes appeared. His "Gondwane" epic, which he began with the final book and afterwards added several more covering the beginning of the saga, lacks its middle volumes, his publisher having canceled the series before he managed to fill the gap between. Similarly, his projected Atlantis trilogy was canceled after the first book (The Black Star), and his five-volume "Chronicles of Kylix" ended with three volumes published and parts of another (Amalric).

Another unfinished project was Carter's self-proclaimed magnum opus, an epic literary fantasy entitled Khymyrium, or, to give it its full title, Khymyrium: The City of the Hundred Kings, from the Coming of Aviathar the Lion to the Passing of Spheridion the Doomed. It was intended to take the genre in a new direction by resurrecting the fantastic medieval chronicle history of the sort exemplified by Geoffrey of Monmouth's Historia Regum Britanniae and Saxo Grammaticus's Gesta Danorum. It was also to present a new invented system of magic called "Enstarrment", which from Carter's description somewhat resembles the system of magical luck investment later devised by Emma Bull and Will Shetterly for their "Liavek" series of shared world anthologies. Carter claimed to have begun the work about 1959, and published three excerpts from it as separate short stories during his lifetime – "Azlon" in The Young Magicians (1969), "The Mantichore" in Beyond the Gates of Dream (also 1969) and "The Sword of Power" in New Worlds for Old (1971). A fourth episode was published posthumously in Fungi #17, a 1998 fanzine. His most comprehensive account of the project appeared in Imaginary Worlds: the Art of Fantasy in 1973. While he continued to make claims for its excellence throughout his lifetime, the complete novel never appeared. Part of the problem was that Carter was forcing himself to write the novel in a formal style more like that of William Morris and quite unlike his own.

His obituary in Crypt of Cthulhu additionally mentions projects such as "an epic poem on Alexander the Great, a history of the Order of the Golden Dawn, a new Prince Zarkon novel, The Moon Menace, a detective novel, and a Star Pirate novella called 'Beyond the Worlds We Know'".

Carter also spoke about publishing a magazine titled Yoh-Vombis, which he intended to consist of stories he would have published in his paperback Weird Tales series had he been permitted to continue editing it. As well as new fantastic stories, he intended to publish stories and verse by Robert E. Howard and Clark Ashton Smith; unpublished letters from Smith and H. P. Lovecraft; and art by Smith, Roy Krenkel, Mahlon Blaine, etc. However, this mooted magazine never eventuated.

== Career as editor and critic ==
Carter was a critic of contemporary fantasy and a historian of the genre. His book reviews and surveys of the year's best fantasy fiction appeared regularly in Castle of Frankenstein, continuing after that magazine's 1975 demise in The Year's Best Fantasy Stories. His early studies of the works of J. R. R. Tolkien (Tolkien: A Look Behind "The Lord of the Rings") and H. P. Lovecraft (Lovecraft: A Look Behind the Cthulhu Mythos) were followed up by the wide-ranging Imaginary Worlds: the Art of Fantasy, a study tracing the emergence and development of modern fantasy from the late nineteenth century novels of William Morris through the 1970s. Peter Beagle faulted Carter's scholarship, saying "He gets so many facts embarrassingly wrong, so many attributions misquoted, that the entire commentary is essentially worthless."

He was an editor for Ballantine Books from 1969 to 1974, when Carter brought several then-obscure books of fantasy back into print under the "Adult Fantasy" line. Authors whose works he revived included Dunsany, Morris, Smith, James Branch Cabell, Hope Mirrlees, and Evangeline Walton. David G. Hartwell praised the series, saying it brought "into mass editions nearly all the adult fantasy stories and novels worth reading." He also helped new authors break into the field, such as Katherine Kurtz, Joy Chant, and Sanders Anne Laubenthal.

Carter was a fantasy anthologist, editing a number of new anthologies of classic and contemporary fantasy for Ballantine and other publishers. He also edited several anthology series, including the Flashing Swords! series from 1973 to 1981, the first six volumes of The Year's Best Fantasy Stories for DAW Books from 1975 to 1980, and an anthology format revival of the classic fantasy magazine Weird Tales from 1981 to 1983.

Together with SAGA he sponsored the Gandalf Award, an early fantasy equivalent to science fiction's Hugo Award, for the recognition of outstanding merit in authors and works of fantasy. It was given annually by the World Science Fiction Society from 1974 to 1981, but went into abeyance with the collapse of Carter's health in the 1980s. Its primary purpose continues to be fulfilled by the initially rival World Fantasy Awards, first presented in 1975.

== Posthumous revival ==
Wildside Press began an extensive program returning much of Carter's fiction to print in 1999. All remain in print, and one original book was issued in 2012, collecting the short stories about Thongor. See the bibliography for Wildside reissues.

== Awards ==
- Nova Award, 1972.

== See also ==
- Ballantine Adult Fantasy Series
- Swordsmen and Sorcerers' Guild of America
- Trap Door Spiders
- Black Widowers
- Gandalf Award
