= Waziri (fictional tribe) =

Fictional central African tribe that appears in the Tarzan universe

- Tarzan race
- First appearance: The Return of Tarzan (1913)

In-universe information
- Type: Central African
- Affiliation: Tarzan

The Waziri are a fictional central African tribe created by Edgar Rice Burroughs in his Tarzan novels. Burroughs characterizes the Waziri as the greatest warriors in Africa, though small in numbers. They are feared by Arab ivory and slave traders as well as cannibal tribes, and known from western to eastern Africa. The Waziri also appear in other media based on the novels.

== Origin of the name ==
According to David Arthur Adams, Burroughs may have coined the name "Waziri" on the basis of two historical Indigenous African groups: "The infamous slaver, Tippu-Tib, who accompanied Henry Morton Stanley upon part of his journey, employed the Wangwana (the name of the inhabitants of Uganda) and Wanyamwizi (from Tanzania) to help round up slaves. The name Waziri could very likely be one of ERB's name juxtapositions, and, again, the reversal of alliances would be a normal practice in his writing." Burroughs frequently used Stanley's writings as a source for his early Tarzan novels.

== The Waziri as portrayed by Burroughs ==
=== In West Africa ===
In The Return of Tarzan, Tarzan returns from civilization to his beloved jungle. But he has changed. Previously his relationship with natives was violent and antagonistic, colored by the death of his ape foster mother Kala at the hands of a native hunter, but he has experienced humanity in all its varieties since then. So now, when he meets a black warrior, instead of killing him he saves him from Numa, the lion. The warrior, Busuli, is a member of the Waziri tribe. Tarzan discovers they are cultured and despise cannibals like the tribe he had intermittently warred against in his youth. Tarzan is accepted as a member of the tribe after teaching them a new practical way of hunting elephants. These two hunts are the only recorded instances of his killing "Tantor", the elephant.

When Arab ivory traders and their cannibal slaves attack the Waziri village, causing the death of the old chief (also named Waziri) and many others, Tarzan takes the lead, preventing the burning of the village and defeating the Arabs with effective guerrilla-tactics by killing them one at a time. Tarzan then becomes the new chief of the tribe and from then on these noble black warriors share his fate. The Waziri take him to their secret treasure-trove, the lost city of Opar, which they first discovered in the days of the deceased former chief Chowambi, Waziri's father.

Tarzan leaves Africa and the Waziri for England at the end of The Return of Tarzan, seemingly forever. But by the time of the next book in which he appears, the non-Tarzan novel The Eternal Lover, he has established a plantation in Uziri, the land of the Waziri, on which he and his wife Jane reside part-time, and where they entertain guests. According to the map that shows Africa as Burroughs imagined it, the Waziri village was somewhere in Angola.

The Waziri are mentioned but do not appear in the next Tarzan book, The Beasts of Tarzan. However, during the adventure Tarzan meets a native warrior, Mugambi, chief of the Wagambi of Ugambi, whom he invites to join the Waziri at the conclusion. He is subsequently shown to have done so. In The Son of Tarzan the Waziri appear as mostly anonymous native followers of Tarzan, and are not named as a tribe. One of their number, Muviri, is presumably the same character as the Muviro of later books.

=== In transition ===
While Burroughs does not recount the event, it is evident that at some point between The Beasts of Tarzan (in which the Waziri country of Uziri is last mentioned), and Tarzan the Untamed the tribe moves with Tarzan to a new plantation located east of Lake Victoria in British East Africa (now known as Kenya). The relocation likely takes place between the intervening books, The Son of Tarzan and Tarzan and the Jewels of Opar. As the protagonist of Son enters Africa near the west coast, "a little below the equator," the plantation shown therein is presumably the original one. In Jewels, the plantation's proximity to the Belgian Congo is compatible with either location, but the intervention of Abyssinian soldiers from the north appears to indicate an east African setting. The prominent presence in both books of Arab raiders from the east African coast does not fix the setting, as historically these ranged widely through south central Africa, and indeed attack the Waziri in their original country as early as The Return of Tarzan.

=== In East Africa ===
By the time of Tarzan and the Jewels of Opar, Basuli (presumably the Busuli of Return) is chieftain of the tribe under Tarzan, with Mugambi from Beasts shown as a prominent warrior. The organization of the Waziri has changed from tribal to a more feudal system. They live with Tarzan and Jane in their plantation, with members taking care of cooking and cleaning, and even Jane's rose garden. They no longer call Tarzan "King of Waziri," but rather "Big Bwana," while he calls them his "children": "...and were the heart of the Big Bwana not filled with love for his black children".

The Waziri suffer a major reverse in Jewels when a large number of their young men accompany Tarzan on an expedition to recover more wealth from Opar; in their absence, most of the warriors left behind to protect the estate are slaughtered in an Arab raid, and the plantation burned. A few of those on the expedition also perish. The plantation is reconstructed at the end of the book.

By the time of Tarzan the Untamed the estate and the Waziri are definitely in East Africa, and once again the former is destroyed and the latter slaughtered, this time by German-led raiders from Tanganyika in the opening days of World War I. Among the Waziri perishing in the raid is the warrior Wasimbu, son of Muviro, who is crucified, and presumably also Basuli and Mugambi, as they are absent from this and all later novels. By the time of Tarzan and the Golden Lion the survivors of the Waziri under "Old Muviro" have reconstructed the main bungalow and other buildings destroyed in the war. Another survivor is Usula, who is revealed to have gone to London in his boyhood as a servant to Tarzan; he has learned fluent English as a result. Usula reappears in the following novel, Tarzan and the Ant Men.

In later novels, beginning with Tarzan and the Lost Empire, Muviro is portrayed as sub-chief of the Waziri under Tarzan. He and his warriors feature sporadically in subsequent books. They accompany Tarzan to the subterranean realm of Pellucidar in Tarzan at the Earth's Core, and appear in its non-Tarzan sequel, Back to the Stone Age. They also turn up in Tarzan the Invincible, Tarzan Triumphant, and Tarzan's Quest, in which Muviro's search for his lost daughter Buira forms an important sub-plot to the main action, as well as Tarzan the Magnificent, in which another warrior, Waranji, is named, and the short story "Tarzan and the Champion," which forms part of the collection Tarzan and the Castaways.

=== Waziri named in the novels ===
- Buira, a Waziri woman, daughter of Muviro, who went missing and was searched for by her father.
- Busuli, a Waziri warrior who introduces Tarzan to the tribe. Later subchief under Tarzan, assuming he is the same as "Basuli," who appears in that role. Basuli presumably died in the German raid on the Greystoke plantation during World War I.
- Chowambi, chief of the tribe before Waziri, his son.
- Mugambi, originally chief of the Wagambi of Ugambi tribe; on Tarzan's invitation he joined the Waziri as a warrior. Mugambi presumably died in the German raid on the Greystoke plantation during World War I.
- Muviro, an aged Waziri warrior who knew Tarzan "in the old days," assuming he is the same as "Muviri," who is introduced in that role. Later subchief under Tarzan in succession to Basuli. Father of Wasimbu and Buira.
- Tarzan, chief of the tribe in succession to Waziri after the latter's decease. Also known initially as Waziri.
- Usula, a Waziri who went to London in his youth as a servant to Tarzan, who as a result learned fluent English. Later returned to Africa and served on the Greystoke plantation.
- Waranji, a Waziri warrior.
- Wasimbu, a Waziri warrior who was crucified to death by the Germans who raided the Greystoke plantation during World War I. Son of Muviro.
- Waziri, chief of the tribe in succession to Chowambi, his father. Evidently each chief takes the name of the tribe as his own. (Tarzan, Waziri's successor, is also initially called "Waziri" by his tribesmen.) Presumably the title is used only for the current chief, previous chiefs, like Chowambi, being referred to by their original personal names on decease. The personal name of this "Waziri" is not given in the novels.

== The Waziri in other media ==
The Waziri are featured in Tarzan comic books and comic strips in a role identical to their portrayal in Burrough's Tarzan books. In other media, their portrayal varies.

In the 1952 movie Tarzan's Savage Fury, which incorporates some elements from The Return of Tarzan, the Waziri (here called the Wazuri) are a tribe Tarzan's father had ministered to as a missionary before dying and leaving Tarzan an orphan. The villainous Rokov tricks Tarzan and Jane into leading him to the tribe, scheming to rob it of its vast treasure of diamonds.

In the 1998 movie Tarzan and the Lost City, incorporating elements from Return and from The Beasts of Tarzan, Mugambi appears under the alternate spelling Mugambe as a witch doctor. He warns Tarzan, apparently by telepathy, of an expedition by treasure hunters seeking the lost city of Opar that is laying waste to Tarzan's homeland.

In the 2001 Disney TV series The Legend of Tarzan, the Waziri are a forest-dwelling tribe friendly but not subordinate to Tarzan, studied by Jane's father Archimedes Q. Porter and Irish anthropologist Robin Doyle. The tribe is led by Chief Keewazi, functionally identical to Chief Waziri in The Return of Tarzan; the novels' Basuli appears as his headstrong son, being groomed to be the next chief, and Muviro as a villainous Waziri warrior jealous of Basuli and hostile to outsiders. Muviro attempts to kill both Basuli and Tarzan so that he himself will be the next chief, but his treachery is exposed and he is banished from the tribe. The tribe as a whole is menaced in their debut appearance by toxic wastewater from an illegal mining operation. Oddly, Queen La of Opar is portrayed as a former Waziri.

In the 2016 movie The Legend of Tarzan, the Waziri are recast as the Kuba, a tribe the young Jane Porter's father had served as a missionary, and to whom she had brought the severely injured Tarzan after he had saved her from an ape attack. The Kuba tribal name presumably derives from the historical Congolese Kuba Kingdom. In the film, Muviro appears as chief of the tribe and a benevolent elder, as in the novels, and is an educated, literate man fluent in several languages. He welcomes the now married Tarzan and Jane back to the Kuba village after their long absence in England. He and other tribe members are subsequently killed in a raid by Léon Rom and his mercenaries; several of the remaining warriors afterwards join Tarzan and his companion George Washington Williams on a quest for vengeance against Rom. The Kuba are portrayed as being as adept at jungle craft as Tarzan.

In the 2016 book "A Natural History of Human Morality," Michael Tomasello uses the name to refer to a hypothetical tribe some 150,000 years ago and explains what role cultural customs would play in the evolution of objective morality.

== Analysis ==
The portrayal of Waziri in Tarzan novels is positive and can be seen as that of a stereotypical “noble savages”. This portrayal has also been criticized as exemplifying "in miniature, certain versions of imperialism and liberal neocolonialism. It enacts a fantasy of Western superiority being voluntarily recognized and rewarded by 'natives' that is typical of Western writing about Africa.... [Tarzan] establishes first his fellowship, then his kingship... and then his benign mastery [over Waziri]".

== See also ==
- Watusi
- Zulu people
- Swahili people
