= Muviro =

Fictional character from Tarzan universe

- First appearance: The Return of Tarzan
- Created by: Edgar Rice Burroughs

In-universe information
- Gender: Male
- Title: Chief
- Nationality: Waziri

Muviro, chief of the Waziri, is a character in the Tarzan saga created by Edgar Rice Burroughs.

== Character ==
Muviro is depicted as a somewhat elderly warrior of the Waziri, wise, brave and respected, and a good friend of Tarzan. He serves as the sub-chief of the tribe under Tarzan. He has two known relatives; Wasimbu, a son, and Buira, a daughter.

== In the Tarzan novels ==
The character of Muviro emerges gradually in the novels. The Waziri tribe itself first appears in The Return of Tarzan, the second book, and while Muviro is not named in that novel, he can be presumed to be among the numerous anonymous warriors mentioned. The first actual reference to him may occur in The Son of Tarzan, the fourth book, in which a "Muviri" appears as a minor character, stated to be a follower of Tarzan who had known him in "the old days." The first unambiguous occurrence of the name Muviro is in Tarzan the Untamed, the seventh book, in which he is mentioned as the father of Wasimbu, a Waziri warrior crucified by the Germans during their World War I destruction of Tarzan's African estate. Muviro's earliest appearance in person (at least under that name) is in Tarzan and the Golden Lion, the ninth book, as one of the members of the tribe welcoming Tarzan's family back to the estate at the end of the war.

Subsequent appearances include book 12, Tarzan and the Lost Empire, the first book to give his title as sub-chief, book 13, Tarzan at the Earth's Core, in which he and some of his warriors accompany the Ape Man to the subterranean realm of Pellucidar, book 14, Tarzan the Invincible, book 15, Tarzan Triumphant, book 19, Tarzan's Quest, in which his search for his lost daughter Buira forms an important sub-plot to the main action, book 21, Tarzan the Magnificent, and the short story "Tarzan and the Champion," collected in book 24, Tarzan and the Castaways.

Muviro and his warrior band also appear in Back to the Stone Age, a non-Tarzan sequel to Tarzan at the Earth's Core set during the sojourn in Pellucidar.

== In other media ==
Muviro is featured in Tarzan comic books and comic strips in a role identical to his portrayal in Burrough's Tarzan books.

In the 2001 Disney series of animated cartoons The Legend of Tarzan, Muviro is recast as a villainous Waziri warrior. Serving the chief's son Basuli, he is secretly jealous of him, as well as hostile to outsiders, particularly Tarzan and his friends. When Basuli and Tarzan go on a quest to obtain an eagle's feather from a mountain in preparation for Basuli to wed and to become the next chief, Muviro plots to kill them both so that he himself can be chief. He engineers incidents causing several delays in the duo's journey; felling a tree into a river they are crossing, stampeding a herd of rhinos after them, and starting a rock slide as they near the mountain. He is exposed by Tarzan after his third attempt, and fights Basuli, who defeats and banishes him from the tribe for his treachery. Muviro is last seen walking away into the mist with an angry face, implying he may return for revenge.

In the 2016 movie The Legend of Tarzan, Muviro, portrayed by Yule Masiteng, is chief of the Kuba, a tribe the young Jane Porter's father had served as a missionary, and to which she had brought the severely injured Tarzan after he had saved her from an ape attack. In the film, Muviro is a benevolent elder, as in the novels, as well as an educated, literate man fluent in several languages. He welcomes the now married Tarzan and Jane back to the Kuba village after their long absence in England, but is subsequently killed in a raid by Léon Rom and his mercenaries.
