= Tarzan the Untamed =

1919 book by Edgar Rice Burroughs

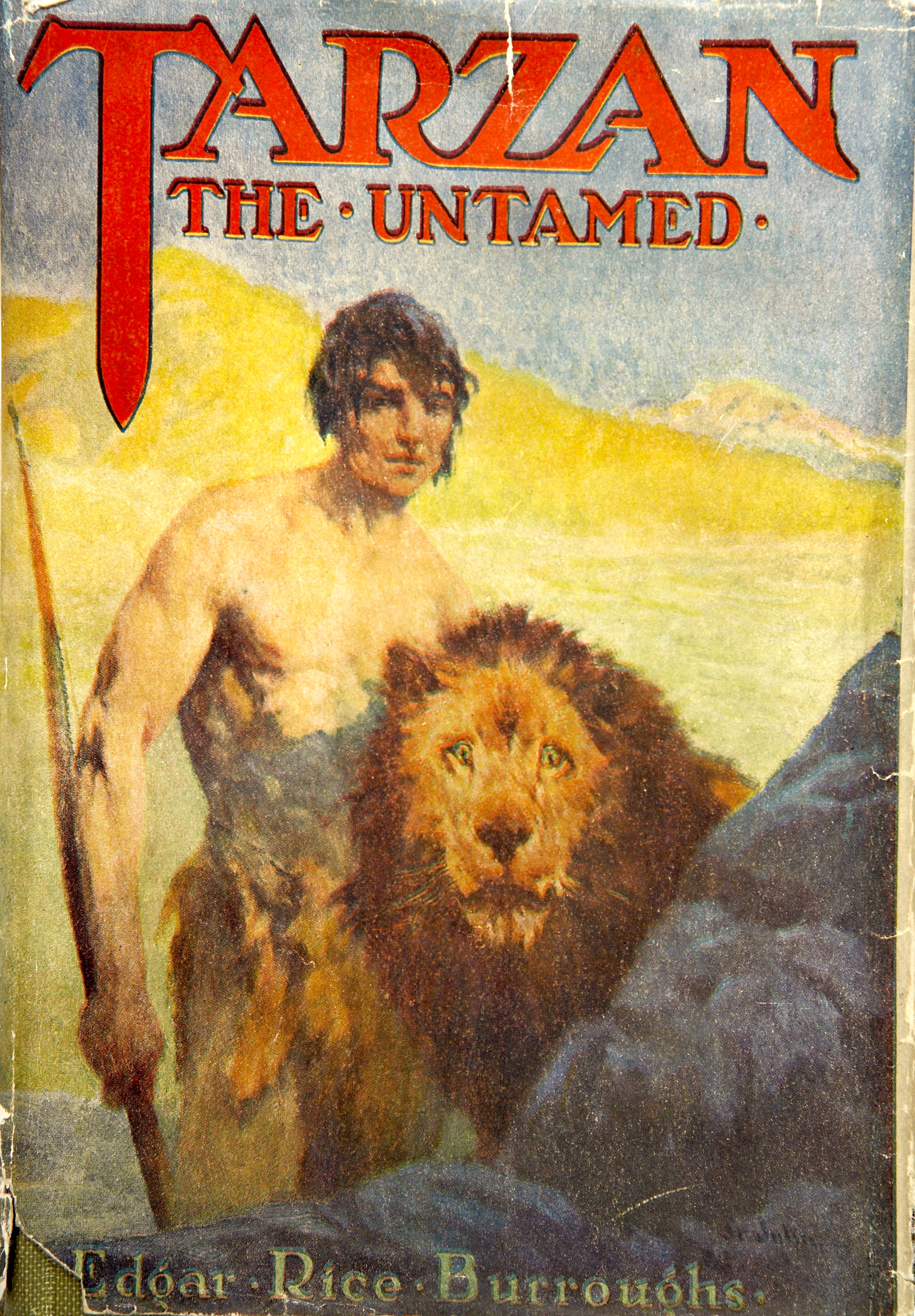
- Dust-jacket illustration of Tarzan the Untamed
- Author: Edgar Rice Burroughs
- Illustrator: J. Allen St. John
- Language: English
- Series: Tarzan series
- Genre: Adventure
- Publisher: A. C. McClurg
- Publication date: 1919-1920
- Publication place: United States
- Media type: Print (hardback)
- Pages: 428
- Preceded by: Jungle Tales of Tarzan
- Followed by: Tarzan the Terrible
- Text: Tarzan the Untamed at Wikisource

Tarzan the Untamed is a book by American writer Edgar Rice Burroughs, the seventh in his series of twenty-four books about the title character Tarzan. It was originally published as two separate stories serialized in different pulp magazines; "Tarzan the Untamed" (also known as "Tarzan and the Huns") in Redbook from March to August, 1919, and "Tarzan and the Valley of Luna" in All-Story Weekly from March to April 1920. The two stories were combined under the title of the first in the first book edition, published in 1920 by A. C. McClurg. In order of writing, the book follows Jungle Tales of Tarzan, a collection of short stories about the ape-man's youth. Chronologically, it follows Tarzan and the Jewels of Opar.

== Plot summary ==
The action is set during World War I. While John Clayton, Lord Greystoke (Tarzan) is away from his plantation home in British East Africa, it is destroyed by invading German troops from Tanganyika. On his return he discovers among many burned bodies one that appears to be the corpse of his wife, Jane Porter Clayton. Another fatality is the Waziri warrior Wasimbu, left crucified by the Germans. (Wasimbu's father Muviro, first mentioned in this story, goes on to play a prominent role in later Tarzan novels.)

Maddened, the ape-man seeks revenge not only on the perpetrators of the tragedy but all Germans, and sets out for the battle front of the war in east Africa. On the way he has a run-in with a lion (or Numa, as it is called by the apes among whom Tarzan was raised), which he traps in a gulch by blocking the entrance. At the front he infiltrates the German headquarters and seizes Major Schneider, the officer he believes led the raid on his estate. Returning to the gulch, he throws his captive to the lion. Tarzan goes on to help the British in the battle in various ways, including setting the lion loose in the enemy trenches, and kills von Goss, another German officer involved in the attack on the Greystoke estate.

He then becomes embroiled in the affairs of Bertha Kircher, a woman he has seen in both the German and British camps, and believes to be a German spy, particularly after he learns she possesses his mother's locket, which he had given as a gift to Jane. His efforts to retrieve it led him to a rendezvous between Kircher and Captain Fritz Schneider, brother of the major Tarzan threw to the lion previously, and the actual commander of the force that burned the estate. Killing Schneider, Tarzan believes his vengeance complete. Abandoning his vendetta against the Germans he departs for the jungle, swearing off all company with mankind.

Seeking a band of Mangani, the apes among whom he had been raised, Tarzan crosses a desert, undergoing great privations. Indeed, the desert is almost his undoing. He only survives by feigning death to lure a vulture (Ska in the ape language) following him into his reach; he then catches and devours the vulture, which gives him the strength to go on.

On the other side of the desert Tarzan locates the ape band. While with them he once again encounters Bertha Kircher, who has just escaped from Sergeant Usanga, leader a troop of native deserters from the German army, by whom she had been taken captive. Despite his suspicion of Bertha, Tarzan's natural chivalry leads him to grant her shelter and protection among the apes. Later he himself falls captive to the tribe of cannibals the deserters have sheltered among, along with Harold Percy Smith-Oldwick, a British aviator who has been forced down in the jungle. Learning of Tarzan's plight, Bertha heroically leads the apes against the natives and frees them both.

Smith-Oldwick becomes infatuated with Bertha, and they search for his downed plane. They find it, but are captured again by Usanga, who attempts to fly off in it with Bertha. Tarzan arrives in time to board the plane as it takes off and throw Usanga from the plane. Smith-Oldwick and Bertha Kircher then try to pilot it back across the desert to civilization, but fail to make it. Seeing the plane go down, Tarzan once more sets out to rescue them. On the way he encounters another Numa, this one an unusual black lion caught in a pit trap, and frees it.

He, the two lovers and the lion are soon reunited, but attacked by warriors from the lost city of Xuja, hidden in a secret desert valley. Tarzan is left for dead and Bertha and Smith-Oldwick taken prisoner. The Xujans are masters of the local lions and worshippers of parrots and monkeys. They are also completely insane as a consequence of long inbreeding. Recovering, Tarzan once more comes to the rescue of his companions, aided by the lion he had saved earlier. But the Xujans pursue them and they turn at bay to make one last stand. The day is saved by a search party from Smith-Oldwick's unit, which turns the tide.

Afterward, Tarzan and Smith-Oldwick find out that Bertha is a double agent who has actually been working for the British. Tarzan also learns from the diary of the deceased Fritz Schneider that Jane might still be alive.

== Controversy ==
Tarzan the Untamed was one of Burroughs' most controversial novels. The controversy stemmed from his blanket portrayal of Germans as stereotypical, unredeemable villains, one that was also extended to his contemporary science fiction novel The Land That Time Forgot. This portrayal, while perhaps understandable in wartime, ultimately ruined the market for his writing in Germany, where the character of Tarzan had formerly been quite popular. Burroughs' later introduction of heroic Germans into his subsequent novels Tarzan and the Lost Empire, Tarzan at the Earth's Core and Back to the Stone Age did little to repair the damage to his reputation there.

== Legacy ==
Previous novels in the series had dealt primarily with the ape-man’s own affairs, while Tarzan the Untamed and later ones (beginning with Tarzan, Lord of the Jungle) would cast him as a protector and enabler of others.

Tarzan the Untamed introduced the lost civilization of Xuja, foreshadowing a pattern in later Tarzan novels. Of the six books before Tarzan the Untamed, two featured the lost city of Opar, but otherwise the series centered on Tarzan’s adventures in his natural environment, the jungle. After Tarzan the Untamed, lost civilizations in remote parts of Africa became common in the novels. Such places tended to consist of two warring cities or kingdoms.

== Comic adaptations ==
The book has been adapted into comic form on a number of occasions.

- Tarzan newspaper daily strips in 1932-1933 (art by Rex Maxon)
- Tarzan newspaper daily strips 5/4/51—7/6/51, partial adaptation of chapters 8, 10 and 11 (script by Dick Van Buren, art by Bob Lubbers)
- Tarzan #163-164, dated January–March 1968 (script by Gaylord DuBois, art by Russ Manning), published by Gold Key Comics
- Tarzan #250-256, dated June–December 1976 (script by Gerry Conway and Denny O'Neil, art by José Luis García-López and others), published by DC Comics

Preceded by Jungle Tales of Tarzan	Tarzan series Tarzan the Untamed	Succeeded by Tarzan the Terrible
