= Tantor =

Term from Edgar Rice Burroughs' Tarzan novels

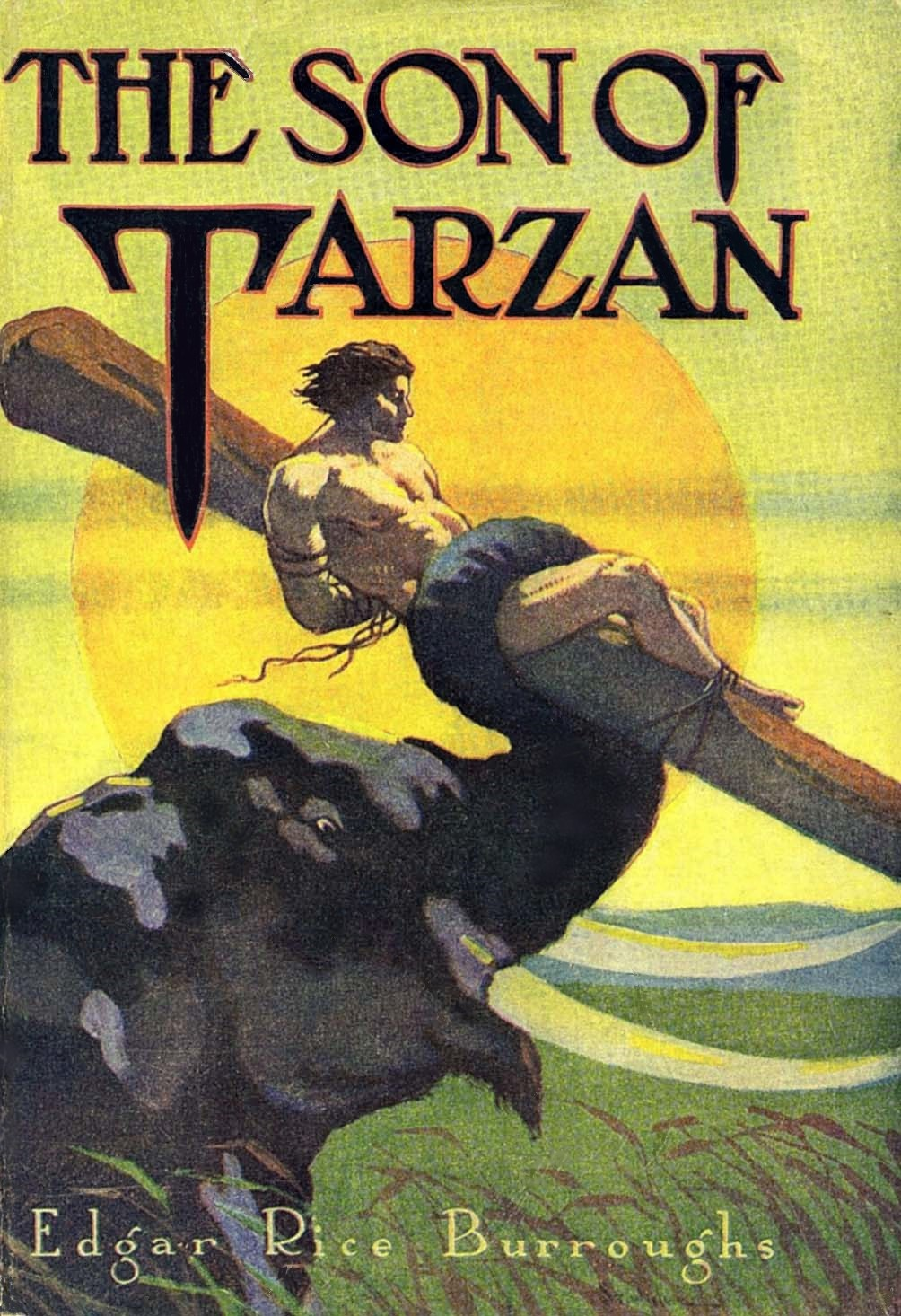
- Dust cover of The Son of Tarzan (1st ed., 1917), showing Tantor
- First appearance: Tarzan of the Apes
- Created by: Edgar Rice Burroughs

In-universe information
- Species: African forest elephant
- Gender: Male

Tantor is a generic name for elephants in Mangani, the fictional language of the great apes in the Tarzan novels of Edgar Rice Burroughs. In Burroughs's works a number of elephants appear under the name of Tantor, most notably one particular bull elephant the ape man befriends in his youth in the first Tarzan novel, Tarzan of the Apes and in the 1999 animated Walt Disney film Tarzan he is a reddish brown African forest elephant and friends with the ape Terk.

== In the novels ==
The Tantor who becomes Tarzan's companion is referred to only in passing in Tarzan and the Apes and its sequel, The Return of Tarzan (though there is one extended scene in chapter 15 of the latter in which the ape man kills a different elephant to rescue a friend). Elephants are entirely absent from the third book, The Beasts of Tarzan, but Tantor is featured more prominently in subsequent books.

In Tarzan of the Apes, the early relationship between the man and elephant is sketched in just three brief passages:

With Tantor, the elephant, he made friends. How? Ask not. But this is known to the denizens of the jungle, that on many moonlight nights Tarzan of the Apes and Tantor, the elephant, walked together, and where the way was clear Tarzan rode, perched high upon Tantor's mighty back. (Chapter 9)

Tarzan of the Apes ... knew nothing of the brotherhood of man. All things outside his own tribe were his deadly enemies, with the few exceptions of which Tantor, the elephant, was a marked example. (Chapter 10)

Tarzan's reply filled D'Arnot with still greater wonder: I speak only the language of my tribe—the great apes who were Kerchak's; and a little of the languages of Tantor, the elephant, and Numa, the lion, and of the other folks of the jungle I understand. (Chapter 23)

Detailed information regarding Tarzan's early interaction with Tantor appears only in Jungle Tales of Tarzan, the sixth book of the Tarzan series, which relates episodes from the ape man's youth omitted from Tarzan of the Apes.

Much there was which Tarzan could make Tantor understand, and though the small talk of the wild was beyond the great, gray dreadnaught of the jungle, he stood with blinking eyes and gently swaying trunk as though drinking in every word of it with keenest appreciation. As a matter of fact it was the pleasant, friendly voice and caressing hands behind his ears which he enjoyed, and the close proximity of him whom he had often borne upon his back since Tarzan, as a little child, had once fearlessly approached the great bull, assuming upon the part of the pachyderm the same friendliness which filled his own heart.

In the years of their association Tarzan had discovered that he possessed an inexplicable power to govern and direct his mighty friend. At his bidding, Tantor would come from a great distance—as far as his keen ears could detect the shrill and piercing summons of the ape-man—and when Tarzan was squatted upon his head, Tantor would lumber through the jungle in any direction which his rider bade him go. It was the power of the man-mind over that of the brute and it was just as effective as though both fully understood its origin, though neither did. (Chapter 2)

Tantor's next chronological appearance is in the fourth novel, The Son of Tarzan, written and published prior to Jungle Tales. In this book he is befriended by Tarzan's son Korak and becomes a key figure in the plot. At the climax of the novel in chapter 27 he is stopped in the midst of a rampage by a word of command from Tarzan himself. This scene, in which Tantor recognizes his former companion after the latter had been absent many years, confirms that this elephant is the same as the one originally befriended by Tarzan.

Tantor appeared in the fourteenth novel Tarzan the Invincible.

== In other media ==
In the 1999 animated film of the same name produced by Walt Disney Feature Animation, Tantor is the personal name of this original elephant companion of Tarzan's rather than a term designating all elephants. In this version, Tantor is a sweet-natured yet highly phobic elephant afraid of many things, such as germs and frightening sounds. His and other elephants' skin color is brown or reddish, instead of gray. Tantor is voiced by Wayne Knight in the first film and by Jim Cummings in subsequent appearances. He appeared in two episodes for the crossover animated television series House of Mouse, including "The Stolen Cartoons" and "Donald and the Aracuan Bird".

In books two (On the Steel Breeze) and three (Poseidon's Wake) of the Alastair Reynolds series Poseidon's Children, Tantors are the name adopted by a number of cognitively enhanced elephants who are imbued with rudimentary speech and inner monologue, the use of tools, a sense of identity and so on via neural implants, and which travel to the planets Crucible and Orison aboard holoships, supported by members of the Akinya spacefaring family.

== See also ==
- Cultural depictions of elephants
