= La (Tarzan) =

- Tarzan confronting La, from the cover of a paperback edition of Tarzan the Invincible by Edgar Rice Burroughs, Ballantine Books, 1974
- First appearance: The Return of Tarzan
- Created by: Edgar Rice Burroughs
- Portrayed by: Mademoiselle Kithnou

In-universe information
- Species: Human
- Gender: Female
- Occupation: Queen and High priestess, Witch
- Nationality: African

La is a character in Edgar Rice Burroughs's series of Tarzan novels, the queen and high priestess of Opar, a lost city in the jungles of Africa. Opar is portrayed as a surviving colony of ancient Atlantis in which incredible riches have been stockpiled down through the ages. The city's population exhibits extreme sexual dimorphism caused by a combination of excessive inbreeding, cross-breeding with apes (which Burroughs treated as possible), and selective culling of offspring. Consequently, female Oparians are physically perfect, while male Oparians are hideous bestial creatures.

La first appeared in the second Tarzan novel, The Return of Tarzan (1913), and reappeared in the fifth, Tarzan and the Jewels of Opar (1916), the ninth, Tarzan and the Golden Lion (1923), and the fourteenth, Tarzan the Invincible (1930). She is also mentioned in the juvenile Tarzan story Tarzan and the Tarzan Twins, with Jad-Bal-Ja, the Golden Lion (1936), the events of which occur between Tarzan and the Golden Lion and Tarzan the Invincible.

== La in the original Tarzan novels ==
La is first encountered in The Return of Tarzan, in which the ape man is led to the lost city of Opar by the Waziri tribe, who have raided it in the past for the gold they use for their ornaments. They spirit away a great treasure, but the bestial Oparians capture Tarzan and condemn him to be sacrificed to their "Flaming God" (the sun). To his surprise, the priestess to perform the sacrifice is a beautiful woman who speaks the ape language he learned as a child. She tells him she is La, high priestess of the lost city. She falls in love with him, as he is so much more physically perfect and attractive than the male Oparians. When the sacrificial ceremony is fortuitously interrupted, La hides Tarzan and promises to lead him to freedom. But the ape man escapes on his own, locates a treasure chamber, and manages to rejoin the Waziri. A party of the Oparian ape-men pursue him. Later, Tarzan's own love Jane Porter falls into their hands, and they take her to Opar as a substitute victim. Learning of her capture, the ape man returns to Opar and in time to save her from being sacrificed by La. La is crushed by Tarzan's spurning of her for Jane.

In Tarzan and the Jewels of Opar Tarzan is back in Opar seeking more treasure, having suffered financial reverses. Encountering La, Tarzan again rejects her and she tries to have him killed, but he escapes along with La's sacred dagger. The Oparians follow and eventually recapture him, but La finds herself unable to kill him. Cadj, Opar's high priest, brands her a traitor, but Tarzan saves La and then persuades the other priests to reject Cadj and return with her to Opar.

In Tarzan and the Golden Lion Tarzan also returns to Opar to replenish his fortune, depleted during World War I in support of the Allied war effort. Again Tarzan is captured, and La is pressured to sacrifice him by Cadj and Oah, a lesser priestess who hopes to displace her. Instead, she helps him escape; both then fall into the hands of the Bolgani (intelligent gorillas) of the Valley of Diamonds, enemies of Opar. Tarzan leads the Bolgani's native slaves in revolt and then returns to Opar at the head of both the natives and the gorillas; La is restored to power, and Cadj killed.

In Tarzan and the Tarzan Twins, with Jad-Bal-Ja, the Golden Lion, exiled adherents of the deceased Cadj seek a place to continue worship of the Flaming God in the traditional way, as La has outlawed human sacrifice in Opar. They take captive Gretchen von Harben, a young white girl they call "Kla", meaning "New La", planning to make her their new high priestess. She is eventually rescued by Tarzan and others, while Glum, leader of the exiles, and some of his adherents are killed. Tarzan orders the survivors to return to Opar and be loyal to La.

By the time of Tarzan the Invincible, rumors of Opar's existence are widespread enough that a Communist-led expedition heads there, seeking its gold to finance a plot to embroil France and Italy in a colonial war. Tarzan, discovering their presence and purpose in his domain, arrives in Opar ahead of them, only to find La overthrown and Oah in power as high priestess, supported by Cadj's successor Dooth. Tarzan frees La, and eventually, after various adventures, he and his Waziri warriors thwart the Communist plot and again restore La to her position. Oah and Dooth both perish.

== La in other media ==
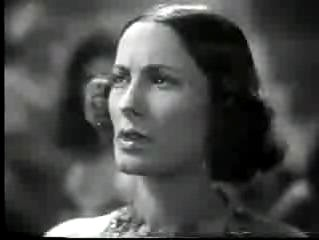
Kithnou as La in Tarzan the Tiger (1929)

La is featured in Tarzan comic books and comic strips in a role identical to her portrayal in Burrough's Tarzan books.

La first appeared on screen in The Adventures of Tarzan (1921), an early black and white silent Tarzan film based on The Return of Tarzan. She was portrayed by actress Lillian Worth, who played opposite Elmo Lincoln, the first screen Tarzan.

In the serial Tarzan the Tiger (1929), based on Tarzan and the Jewels of Opar, La was played by Mademoiselle Kithnou, and Tarzan by Frank Merrill.

La appears in three episodes of Tarzan: The Epic Adventures (1996–97), played by Angela Harry.

La is also a recurring antagonist in The Legend of Tarzan, voiced by Diahann Carroll. Here, Opar is occupied by humanoid leopards created by La's magical staff to serve her (this is a very loose reference to the Leopard Men cult from Burroughs' novel Tarzan and the Leopard Men (1935), though in the books they have nothing to do with La). She tries to make Tarzan fall in love with her and since he is already in love with Jane, has the Leopardmen stage Jane's death; Jane survives and Tarzan discovers the ruse. The next time Tarzan meets La, her head Leopardman takes her staff, which possesses Jane. Working together, Tarzan and the Leopardman save Jane. Learning that the Leopardmen want to be free, Tarzan shatters the staff, which turns the Leopardmen back to normal leopards and La to dust as Opar crumbles to nothing. La's spirit survives, however, and subsequently possesses the bodies of others. Taking over Jane, she finds and reassembles the pieces of her staff, restoring Opar. She is also assisted by French businessman Renard Dumont, who she has transformed into a gibbon (an animal which is native to Southeast Asia, not Africa). When Tarzan and a Waziri native interfere, La takes over his body but is attacked by one of her animated statues and forced into the body of a rat, which is quickly captured in a bag. Since the Disney version of Tarzan is aimed at a younger audience, its La is not nude, but wears a bikini-like loincloth and a top exposing her arms and midriff, both made of panther fur and decorated with animal teeth, as well as jewelry. She is also the first boss of Disney's Disney's Tarzan: Return to the Jungle for the Game Boy Advance.
