= Emirate System in Nigeria =

Emirates system was introduced to Nigeria in the eighteenth century. The emirate system of administration can be likened to a constitutional monarchy. The governments of the emirates were completely centralized. The Emirs controlled the Executive Legislative and Judicial powers of the emirates. The Emirs who were the political, administrative and spiritual leaders appointed a number of officials assigned with specific duties, in the same way Queen of England has a prime minister and ministers for different ministries.

== Officials within the Emirate system ==
Waziri - The Prime Minister of the Emirate.

Sarkin Fada - The spokesman of the Emirate

Sarkin Ruwa - Minister in charge of water Resources.

== Emirate in the northern Nigeria ==
The Kano Emirate System was one of the many changes that happened in Northern Nigeria during Uthman dan Fodio’s Jihad. Prior to the Fulani Jihad, the Kano Emirate was known as the Sultanate of Kano. The Sultanate of Kano dated back to 1349 when Ali Yaji, the King of Kano, who lived from 1849 to 1835 surrendered his pagan Cult of Tsumbubura and accepted Islam. Ali Yaji introduced and taught Islamic practices in Kano and consequently proclaimed Kano a Sultanate. However, the abolition of the Cult of Tsumbubura was without some opposition. Attendant revolts of the abolishment laced the history of Kano with pockets of tidal revolt that led to a civil war known as the Battle of Santolo.

Before the proclamation of Kano as a Sultanate, Kano was known as the Hausa Kingdom as it symbolized the natural home of most Hausas. Kano had gone through many changes including a name change. In the 7th century, Kano was known as Dalla, named after the Dalla Hill; which was the location of a settlement that engaged in iron-working. The name of the settlement, Dalla, will last till the early beginning of the 16th century until it was renamed Kano. By 1804, the Fulani Jihad saw to the fall of the Sultanate of Kano and transformed it to an Emirate subjected to the Sokoto Caliphate

== Organizational structure of the Emirate system ==
Organizational structure of the emirate system is presented as follows:

=== Executive functions ===
The Emir is both the political and spiritual head of the emirate, the Chief Executive and absolute monarch of the emirate who is assisted by the advisers.

Waziri:the head of all the officials

Gaiadima: administrator in charge of the capital city of the emirate

Sarkin Fada: head of palace

Sarkin Ruwa: head of fishing and water resources

Sarkin Pawa: head of all butchers

Hakimi: in charge of district administration

=== Legislative functions ===
Dogari: chief of head of police

Maaji: head of treasury

Yari: chief superintendent

=== Judicial function ===
Alkali: chief judge of Sharia court who administers Sharia law
