= William Cecil Clayton =

- First appearance: Tarzan of the Apes
- Last appearance: Jungle Tales of Tarzan
- Created by: Edgar Rice Burroughs
- Portrayed by: Colin Kenny (The Romance of Tarzan, 1918); Scott Pembroke (The Adventures of Tarzan, 1921); Neil Hamilton (Tarzan the Ape Man, 1932; Tarzan and His Mate, 1934)

In-universe information
- Species: Human
- Gender: Male
- Title: Viscount Greystoke
- Occupation: English aristocrat
- Relatives: John Clayton (uncle); Alice Clayton (aunt); Tarzan (cousin)
- Nationality: British

William Cecil Clayton is a recurring fictional character in Edgar Rice Burroughs's series of Tarzan novels and in adaptations of the saga to other media, particularly comics. He is an English aristocrat.

== In the novels ==
William Cecil Clayton is a paternal cousin of John Clayton (Tarzan), whom he much resembles, and holder of the title of Lord Greystoke to which the latter is rightful heir. William serves as contrast to Tarzan, representing what he would likely have become had he led a normal life rather than being raised by apes, and is his rival for the affections of Jane Porter.

He first appeared in the initial Tarzan novel, Tarzan of the Apes (1912) and reappeared in the second book, The Return of Tarzan (1913), and the sixth, Jungle Tales of Tarzan (1916/17).

When Tarzan's parents are lost in Africa and presumed deceased, the older John Clayton's title passes to the line of his younger brother and thence to his nephew William, who holds it at the time we meet him in Tarzan of the Apes. William is portrayed as a well-meaning but ineffectual person with a romantic interest in Jane Porter, a member of the party marooned in Africa with the Porters. When the castaways encounter Tarzan, William pales in comparison to the Ape Man, who is shown to both the reader and Jane to be physically and morally superior. While feeling himself outclassed, the party's subsequent return to civilization leaves William free to pursue his suit with Jane, who ultimately accepts him. When Tarzan later reappears he learns they are engaged, and realizing that William's title, wealth, and culture make him a more appropriate spouse for Jane, accepts the fact. Tarzan's subsequent discovery that he himself is the rightful Lord Greystoke does not alter his assessment, and he conceals the revelation from both William and Jane.

In The Return of Tarzan, William is revealed to have found the discarded document that disclosed Tarzan's true identity and kept the knowledge to himself, fearing it will cost him his status and Jane. He presses her to set a date, which she, still emotionally torn between him and Tarzan, is reluctant to do. A subsequent return to Africa does nothing to improve his standing in her eyes, though his fundamental decency is highlighted in an ordeal in a lifeboat with two other castaways. When the boat finally reaches shore the starving William is abandoned by the other survivor, the villainous Nikolas Rokoff, and subsequently succumbs to fever. Dying, he redeems himself by confessing his selfish concealment of Tarzan's identity and renouncing his claim on her to Tarzan.

In the short story "The Witch Doctor Seeks Vengeance," which appears in the later but chronologically earlier book Jungle Tales of Tarzan, William appears unnamed in a scene contrasting his privileged, civilized existence with the primitive existence of the young Tarzan. William does not shine in the comparison.

== In other media ==
- Clayton appears in The Romance of Tarzan (1918), portrayed by Colin Kenny.
- Clayton appears in The Adventures of Tarzan (1921), portrayed by Scott Pembroke.
- Clayton, with elements of Nikolas Rokoff, appears in the Walt Disney Animation Studios film Tarzan (1999), voiced by Brian Blessed.
- Clayton, based on the Disney incarnation, appears in the video game adaptation of the film (1999), voiced by Brian Blessed. He serves as the final boss in the game.
- Clayton, based on the Disney incarnation, appears as a boss in Kingdom Hearts (2002), voiced by Brian Blessed in English and Banjō Ginga in Japanese.
- Clayton, based on the Disney incarnation, appears in Disney's Extreme Skate Adventure (2003).
