= Tarzan of the Apes =

1912 novel by Edgar Rice Burroughs

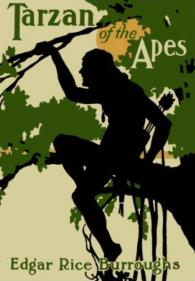
- Dust-jacket illustration of Tarzan of the Apes.
- Author: Edgar Rice Burroughs
- Illustrator: Fred J. Arting
- Cover artist: Fred J. Arting
- Language: English
- Series: Tarzan
- Genre: Adventure
- Publisher: A. C. McClurg
- Publication date: October 1912
- Publication place: United States
- Media type: Print (hardback)
- Pages: 400
- OCLC: 1224185
- Followed by: The Return of Tarzan
- Text: Tarzan of the Apes at Wikisource

Tarzan of the Apes is a 1912 novel by American writer Edgar Rice Burroughs, and the first in the Tarzan series. The story was first printed in the pulp magazine The All-Story in October 1912 before being released as a novel in June 1914.

The story follows the title character Tarzan's adventures, from his childhood being raised by apes in the jungle to his eventual encounters with other humans and Western society. So popular was the character that Burroughs continued the series into the 1940s with two dozen sequels.

Scholars have noted several important themes in the novel: the impact of heredity on behavior; racial superiority; civilization, especially as Tarzan struggles with his identity as a human; sexuality; and escapism.

== Plot summary ==
John and Alice (Rutherford) Clayton, Viscount and Lady Greystoke from England, are marooned in the western coastal jungles of equatorial Africa in 1888. Some time later, their son John Clayton II is born. When he is one year old his mother dies from malaria, and soon thereafter his father is killed by the savage king ape Kerchak. The infant is then adopted by the she-ape widow Kala, who lost her previous son after dropping it from a treetop while being chased by Kerchak.

Clayton is named "Tarzan" ("White Skin" in the ape language) and raised in ignorance of his human heritage.

As a boy, feeling alienated from his peers due to their physical differences, he discovers his true parents' cabin, where he first learns of others like himself in their books. Using basic primers with pictures, over many years he teaches himself to read English, but having "never heard it, cannot speak it."

Upon his return from one visit to the cabin, he is attacked by a huge gorilla which he manages to kill with his father's knife, although he is terribly wounded in the struggle. As he grows up, Tarzan becomes a skilled hunter, exciting the jealousy of Kerchak, who finally attacks him. Tarzan kills Kerchak and takes his place as "king" of the apes.

Later, a tribe of black Africans settle in the area, and Kala is killed by one of its hunters. Avenging himself on the killer, Tarzan begins an antagonistic relationship with the tribe, raiding its village for weapons and practicing cruel pranks on them. They, in turn, regard him as an evil spirit and attempt to placate him.

A few years later, when Tarzan is twenty-one, a new party is marooned on the coast, including nineteen-year-old Jane Porter, the first white woman he has ever seen. Tarzan's cousin, William Cecil Clayton, unwitting usurper of the ape man's ancestral English estate, is also among the party. Tarzan spies on the newcomers, aids them in secret, and saves Jane from the perils of the jungle.

With another ship comes French naval officer Paul D'Arnot. While Tarzan is rescuing D'Arnot from the natives, D'Arnot's crew recover the castaways and depart Africa, presuming Tarzan and D'Arnot dead. D'Arnot teaches Tarzan to speak French and offers to take Tarzan to the land of white men where he might connect with Jane again. On their journey, D'Arnot teaches him how to behave among white men.

Ultimately, Tarzan travels to find Jane in northern Wisconsin, where he rescues her from a fire. Tarzan learns the bitter news that she has become engaged to another man. Meanwhile, clues from his parents' cabin have enabled D'Arnot to prove Tarzan's true identity as John Clayton II, the Earl of Greystoke. Instead of reclaiming his inheritance from William, Tarzan chooses to conceal and renounce his heritage for the sake of Jane's happiness.

== Background ==
Burroughs drifted across the United States until he was thirty-six, holding seventeen consecutive careers before he published stories. He worked as a U.S. cavalryman, a gold miner in Oregon, a cowboy in Idaho, a railroad policeman in Salt Lake City, and an owner of several failed businesses. He decided to write his own pulp fiction after being disappointed by the reading material others offered, and worked in that capacity for four years before his first novel, Tarzan of the Apes, was published. Tarzan first appeared in The All-Story in October 1912. The All-Story published it in its entirety in installments, and it was published in 1914 as a book.

Though The Jungle Book is sometimes cited as an influence on Burroughs' Tarzan of the Apes, he claimed that his only inspiration was the Roman myth of Romulus and Remus. Rudyard Kipling commented that Burroughs "had 'jazzed' the motif of the Jungle Books and, I imagine, thoroughly enjoyed himself."

== Major themes ==
Recent literary criticism often focuses on the identity of the eponymous protagonist of Tarzan of the Apes. Literary scholars, such as Jeff Berglund, Mikko Tuhkanen, J. Michelle Coughlan, Bijana Oklopčić, and Catherine Jurca have examined the overlapping themes of Tarzan's heredity, race, civilized behavior, sexuality, and escapist appeal. Writers in popular culture, such as Gore Vidal, often emphasize Tarzan's escapist appeal.

=== Heredity ===
Burroughs himself acknowledged the centrality of the theme of heredity in the novel, and its conflict with the environment. According to his biographer, John Taliaferro, he claimed in a Writer’s Digest, "I was mainly interested in playing with the idea of a contest between heredity and environment. For this purpose I selected an infant child of a race strongly marked by hereditary characteristics of the finer and nobler sort, and at an age at which he could not have been influenced by association with creatures of his own kind I threw him into an environment as diametrically opposite that to which he had been born as I might well conceive".

The scholar Jeff Burglund notices that although Tarzan was brought up in the jungle far from other humans, he is inexplicably drawn back to his parents’ cabin and the objects which he finds there. He discovers a capacity for gentlemanly behavior around Jane despite no one teaching it to him. Although the African tribes which he fights practice cannibalism, he suddenly feels revulsion when he considers eating one of the African men he kills. When he refuses to eat the African, Burroughs portrays "hereditary instinct" as the reason. Tarzan's genetic association with upper-class, Western civilization conditions his actions more than his violent environment, and Berglund claims that Tarzan could represent the stereotypical "scion of English stock" in colonialized countries. His racial superiority manifests itself through his behavior because it correlates with the ideals of Western civilization, whether he treats a woman politely or cannot force himself to eat an African man.

=== Racism ===
Biljana Oklopčić emphasizes the portrayal of race in Tarzan of the Apes. She claims that Tarzan represents white, male opposition to the "black rapist" stereotype which was prevalent in the Southern U.S. at the time of its publication because the language which describes apes parallels propaganda against people of Sub-Saharan African descent.

Catherine Jurca similarly analyzes Tarzan as opposed to tolerating the presence of people of other races and classes in favor of preserving his own culture. The way that Tarzan defends his corner of civilization, his parents’ home, from the "savages" who want to destroy it, reflects an early twentieth-century American attitude; as darker-skinned immigrants flooded the country, especially urban areas, white Americans feared that their culture would be destroyed by newcomers who did not understand or care about it, and tried to protect the suburbs in the same way that Tarzan tries to protect his home.

Though Burroughs' admirers have tried to downplay claims of racism, or to explain that it was a common stereotype at the time the book was written, John Newsinger examines the extent to which Burroughs unfavorably described black characters. He wrote that Tarzan is the story of the "whiteman's conquest of black savagery", where the native Sub-Saharan Africans are portrayed as brutes whom Tarzan enjoys taunting and killing.

=== Civilization ===
Tarzan's jungle upbringing and eventual exposure to Western civilization form another common theme in literary criticism of the novel. Berglund notes that Tarzan's ability to read and write sets him apart from the apes, the African villagers, and the lower-class sailors in the novel, and culminates in Tarzan recognizing himself as a human for the first time; moreover, he sees himself as a man who is superior to others unlike himself. Jeff Berglund argues that this realization exemplifies Burroughs' portrayal of whiteness and literacy as fundamental to civilization through implying that Tarzan's growth into a perfectly civilized person stems from his Western, white heritage and ability to read and write.

However, Mikko Tuhkanen claims that the apparently civilized qualities of Tarzan, such as his interest in reading, threaten his survival as a human in the jungle. For Tuhkanen, Tarzan represents the fluidity with which humans should define themselves. He asserts, "[T]he human and the nonhuman become grotesquely indistinguishable" in the novel. Humans mistake apes for other humans, an ape tries to rape Jane, Tarzan finds a surrogate ape mother when he cries out like an ape, and he must act against his human instincts by jumping into a dangerous body of water in order to survive an attack from a lion. Because simian and human behavior blend, and because civilized habits seem to threaten human survival, Tuhkanen claims that humans must contradict the expectations of civilization regarding the characteristics of humans. For Tuhkanen, the novel exemplifies “queer ethics,” encouraging “perverse sexuality” along with other behaviors which Western civilization often discouraged.

=== Escapism ===
Most of the stories that Burroughs wrote were stories that he told himself. According to Gore Vidal, when Burroughs was unsatisfied with reality, "he consoled himself with an inner world where he was strong and handsome, adored by beautiful women and worshipped by exotic races." The story served for the most part as a form of masculine escape that inspired men and boys. The adventurous character of Tarzan also appealed to wider American audiences over decades as a powerful means of escaping the sense of boredom and frustration which accompanies a confining society, and to the twentieth-century American desire to reconquer a home that seemed lost. "In the eyes of contemporary man, huddled in large cities and frustrated by a restrictive civilization, Tarzan was a joyous symbol of primitivism, an affirmation of life, endowing the reader with a Promethean sense of power."

== Adaptations ==
=== Film adaptations ===
Burroughs' novel has been the basis of several films. The first two were the silent films Tarzan of the Apes (1918) and The Romance of Tarzan (1918), both starring Elmo Lincoln as Tarzan, based on the first and second parts of the novel, respectively. The next and most famous adaptation was Tarzan the Ape Man (1932), starring Johnny Weissmuller, who went on to star in 11 other Tarzan films. Lincoln was replaced by Weissmuller (as actor); similarly Clayton was replaced by Harry Holt (the character in the films). It was remade twice, as Tarzan, the Ape Man (1959), featuring Denny Miller, and Tarzan, the Ape Man (1981), with Miles O'Keeffe as Tarzan and Bo Derek as Jane.

The 1935 12-part serial, The New Adventures of Tarzan, starred Herman Brix (later, "Bruce Bennett"). This was produced contemporaneously with the Weissmuller versions.

Four more movie adaptations have been made to date: Greystoke: The Legend of Tarzan, Lord of the Apes (1984), a film starring Christopher Lambert that is more faithful to the book; Tarzan of the Apes (1999), a direct-to-video animated film; Tarzan (1999), a Disney animated film with Tony Goldwyn as the voice of Tarzan; and The Legend of Tarzan (2016), a more historically contextualized update starring Alexander Skarsgård and Margot Robbie, as well as Christoph Waltz and Samuel L. Jackson, portraying actual figures in the Congo at that time, the brutal Belgian Captain Léon Rom and American Civil War soldier George Washington Williams, respectively.

A number of Burroughs' other Tarzan novels have also been adapted for the screen. Numerous Tarzan films have been made with no connection to his writings other than the character.

=== Comic adaptations ===
The book has been adapted into comic form on a number of occasions, both in the original Tarzan comic strip and comic books. The strip itself began with Hal Foster's adaptation of the story. Notable adaptations into comic book form include those of Gold Key Comics in Tarzan no. 155 (script by Gaylord DuBois, art by Russ Manning), dated September 1966 (reprinted in no. 178, dated October 1969), DC Comics in Tarzan nos. 207–210, dated April–July 1972 (script and art by Joe Kubert), and Marvel in Marvel Super Special no. 29, dated 1983 (reprinted in Tarzan of the Apes nos. 1–2, dated July–August 1984). Probably the most prestigious comic version, however, was illustrator and former Tarzan comic strip artist Burne Hogarth's 1972 adaptation of the first half of the book into his showcase graphic novel Tarzan of the Apes. (Hogarth subsequently followed up with another graphic novel Jungle Tales of Tarzan (1976), which adapted four stories from Burroughs' identically titled collection of Tarzan stories). Dynamite Entertainment adapted the story for the first six issues of Lord of the Jungle, albeit loosely; for example, the cannibal tribe was replaced by a village of literal apemen.

=== Radio adaptations ===
Three old-time radio series were based on the Tarzan character. Burroughs himself revised each script in the 1932–1934 series as needed for accuracy. That series had Burroughs' daughter, Joan, in the role of Jane.

=== Tarzan in popular music ===
Tarzan has been represented in the form of song from as early as 1959 in the song "Rockin' in the Jungle" by the Eternals which reached a peak of 78 on the American Billboard Hot 100. Tarzan boy was a worldwide hit for the band Baltimora in 1985. Tarzan and Jane was a worldwide hit for the Danish bubble-gum pop band Toy-Box in 1998.

Preceded by none	Tarzan series Tarzan of the Apes	Succeeded by The Return of Tarzan
