= Tarzan Triumphant =

Novel by Edgar Rice Burroughs

- Dust-jacket illustration of Tarzan Triumphant
- Author: Edgar Rice Burroughs
- Illustrator: Studley Oldham Burroughs
- Language: English
- Series: Tarzan series
- Genre: Adventure
- Publisher: Edgar Rice Burroughs, Inc.
- Publication date: 1931-1932
- Publication place: United States
- Media type: Print (Hardback)
- Pages: 318
- Preceded by: Tarzan the Invincible
- Followed by: Tarzan and the City of Gold

Tarzan Triumphant is a novel by American writer Edgar Rice Burroughs, the fifteenth in his series of twenty-four books about the title character Tarzan. The novel was originally serialized in the magazine Blue Book from October, 1931 through March 1932. It should not be confused with the 1943 film Tarzan Triumphs, as the plots are not related.

== Plot summary ==
Backed by Chief Muviro and his faithful Waziri warriors, Tarzan faces Soviet agents seeking revenge after the events of the previous novel, Tarzan the Invincible, and a lost tribe descended from early Christians practicing a bizarre and debased version of the religion. Real-life Soviet dictator Joseph Stalin is used as a minor character in the novel, though he remains in Moscow and does not personally take part in the action.

== Comic adaptations ==
The book has been adapted into comic form by Gold Key Comics in Tarzan nos. 184-185, dated June–July 1969, with a script by Gaylord DuBois and art by Doug Wildey.

Preceded by Tarzan the Invincible	Tarzan series Tarzan Triumphant	Succeeded by Tarzan and the City of Gold
