= Tarzan the Tiger =

1929 film

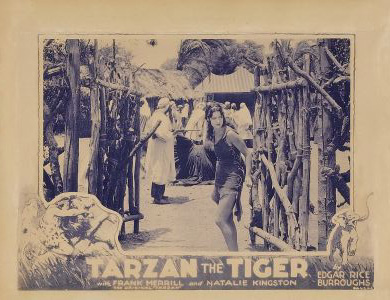
- poster
- Directed by: Henry MacRae
- Written by: Ian McClosky Heath (screenplay)
- Based on: Tarzan and the Jewels of Opar by Edgar Rice Burroughs
- Starring: Frank Merrill as Tarzan; Natalie Kingston as Jane; Al Ferguson; Sheldon Lewis
- Cinematography: Wilfred M. Cline
- Edited by: Malcolm Dewar
- Color process: Black and white
- Distributed by: Universal Pictures
- Release date: December 9, 1929
- Running time: 15 chapters (266 min)
- Country: United States
- Language: English

Tarzan the Tiger (1929) is a Universal movie serial based on the novel Tarzan and the Jewels of Opar by Edgar Rice Burroughs. It stars Frank Merrill as Tarzan, Natalie Kingston as Jane, and Al Ferguson. It was directed by Henry MacRae.

It was once considered a lost film, but a copy has since been found. Today the serial is available on DVD and, in the public domain, available for download on the internet.

== Synopsis ==
Lord Greystoke (Tarzan) returns to Africa, with Lady Jane and friend Albert Werper, in order to return to Opar. He needs the treasure of Opar in order to secure his estates in England. Werper, however, is actually interested in the gold itself. He is in league with Arab slave trader Achmet Zek, who wishes revenge on Tarzan and Lady Jane for himself.

== Cast ==
- Frank Merrill as "The Lord of the Manor—known to London as the Earl of Greystoke—and to the Jungle as Tarzan, the Tiger!"

Frank Merrill reprised his role as Tarzan from Tarzan the Mighty. His performances in these two serials make him the last silent Tarzan and the first sound Tarzan. Merrill did his own stunts and devised the original Tarzan yell.

- Natalie Kingston as "Lady Jane, his wife, who has left the gaiety of London Society to share his life on the Jungle plantation"

Natalie Kingston was again cast as the love interest but this time played the traditional character of Lady Jane instead of Mary Trevor (from Tarzan the Mighty). The change was not explained in the serial.

- Al Ferguson as "Albert Werper, Soldier of Fortune—a guest at Greystoke Manor in the guise of a friendly scientist"

Al Ferguson was also again cast as the villain of the story, but not as the same character (or even a slightly renamed character, as with Jane. In Tarzan the Mighty he played the pirate Black John).

- Kithnou as "The High Priestess of the Sun Worshipers—La, who has sworn that she will have no other mate than Tarzan"

Mademoiselle Kithnou was a dancer and actress of mixed Indian and European descent from Puducherry, at that time in French India, or possibly from Mauritius.

- Sheldon Lewis as "Achmet Zek, a Nomad chief, against whose traffic in slaves Tarzan has waged relentless war"

Quoted text from the opening credits for each character.

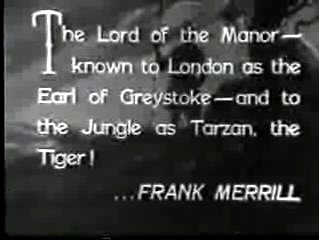
Opening credit for Frank Merrill

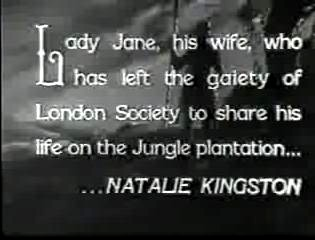
Opening credit for Natalie Kingston

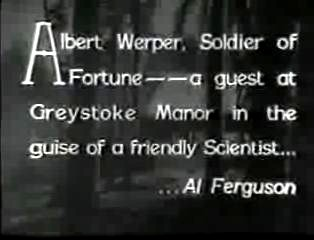
Opening credit for Al Ferguson

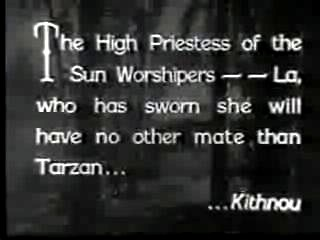
Opening credit for Kithnou

== Production ==
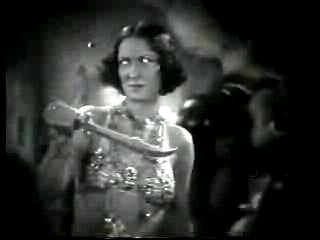
Kithnou as Queen La of Opar

Tarzan the Tiger was a sequel based on the success of Tarzan the Mighty.

Advertising for the serial focused, in addition to the usual jungle serial perils (such as elephants, lions, tigers and gorillas), on the beautiful women (Lady Jane, La, and the women of the slave market scenes). Kingston, as Jane, appeared topless in a swimming sequence in chapter 8. "It is said that fathers sometimes accompanied their sons to the showings."

A further sequel, to create a trilogy of Frank Merrill Tarzan serials, was planned. The third entry would have been called Tarzan the Terrible. However, Merrill's voice was deemed unsuitable for sound films, and the sequel was cancelled. Merrill made personal appearances in costume to promote the serial. During these, he realized how much influence he had on children. Combined with the issues over his voice, this led him to retire after this serial and devote his life to children. He became a Recreational Director for the Parks commission of the Los Angeles city administration.

Tarzan the Tiger was a transitional film with one version released as a silent and the other with a partial soundtrack. The soundtrack consists mostly of only music and sound effects, but does include the first Tarzan yell, although it does not sound like the now-traditional call that was first used in the Johnny Weissmuller Tarzan movie Tarzan the Ape Man.

== Chapter titles ==
The full serial

1. Call of the Jungle
2. The Road to Opar
3. The Altar of the Flaming God
4. The Vengeance of La
5. Condemned to Death
6. Tantor the Terror
7. The Deadly Peril
8. Loop of Death
9. Flight of Werper
10. Prisoner of the Apes
11. The Jaws of Death
12. The Jewels of Opar
13. A Human Sacrifice
14. Tarzan's Rage
15. Tarzan's Triumph

== See also ==
- Nudity in film
