= Opar (fictional city) =

Fictional lost city in Burroughs's Tarzan novels

- Tarzan location
- First appearance: The Return of Tarzan (1913)
- Created by: Edgar Rice Burroughs
- Genre: Fantasy adventure

In-universe information
- Type: Lost city
- Character: La
- Demonym: Oparian

Opar is a fictional lost city in the Tarzan novels of Edgar Rice Burroughs and later the Khokarsa novels of Philip José Farmer and Christopher Paul Carey, as well as various derivative works in other media.

The city first appeared in Burroughs' second Tarzan novel, The Return of Tarzan (1913).

== Fictional description ==
Opar is a lost colony of Atlantis located deep in the jungles of Central Africa, in which incredible riches have been stockpiled down through the ages. The city's population exhibits extreme sexual dimorphism caused by a combination of excessive inbreeding, cross-breeding with apes, and selective culling of offspring. Consequently, female Oparians appear perfectly human, while male Oparians are apelike brutes. The ruler and high priestess of the city is Queen La, who on her first encounter with Tarzan falls in love with him, and subsequently carries a torch for him. Tarzan, already committed to Jane Porter, spurns her advances, thus endangering his own life, as the religion of Opar condones human sacrifice. Yet he returns to the lost city time and again to replenish his personal wealth from its hoarded treasure.

== Appearances ==
=== In the works of Burroughs ===
After its initial appearance in Burroughs's second Tarzan novel, The Return of Tarzan (1913), Opar is revisited in the fifth, Tarzan and the Jewels of Opar (1916); the ninth, Tarzan and the Golden Lion (1923); and the fourteenth, Tarzan the Invincible (1930). Exiles from Opar also appear in Burroughs' 1936 juvenile story "Tarzan and the Tarzan Twins, with Jad-Bal-Ja, the Golden Lion" (later published as the second part of Tarzan and the Tarzan Twins in 1963).

=== In the works of Farmer and Carey ===
Philip José Farmer includes Opar in his fictional biography Tarzan Alive: A Definitive Biography of Lord Greystoke (1972), where Tarzan decides to hide the now abandoned city by diverting a river to bury it in sediment. Opar is also the eponymous setting of Farmer's novels Hadon of Ancient Opar (1974) and Flight to Opar (1976). He originally planned to continue the series, leaving two incomplete works. The novel The Song of Kwasin and novella Kwasin and the Bear God were later completed by Christopher Paul Carey. Carey went on to write multiple Opar novellas, including Exiles of Kho (2012), Hadon, King of Opar (2015) and Blood of Ancient Opar (2016).

=== In adapted Tarzan media ===
On film, Opar was seen in the early Tarzan films The Adventures of Tarzan (1921), based on The Return of Tarzan; and Tarzan the Tiger (1929), based on Tarzan and the Jewels of Opar; as well as the film Tarzan and the Lost City (1998). Opar also appeared, in the guise of a generic African village, in Tarzan and the Lost Safari (1957), in which the Oparians were led by the male chief Chief Ogonooro (played by Orlando Martins) rather than the female queen/priestess La.

The film The Legend of Tarzan (2016) mentions Opar in the pre-title opening sequence, but does not show the lost city. An expedition to Opar led by Léon Rom is massacred by warriors led by Chief Mbonga, who offers Rom diamonds in exchange for Tarzan. Opar also appears in the Disney TV adaptation, crumbling after the sceptre of La is destroyed.

=== In other media ===
The City of Opar was mentioned in passing in the League of Extraordinary Gentlemen graphic novels.
