= Burne Hogarth =

American artist, educator, and cartoonist (1911–1996)

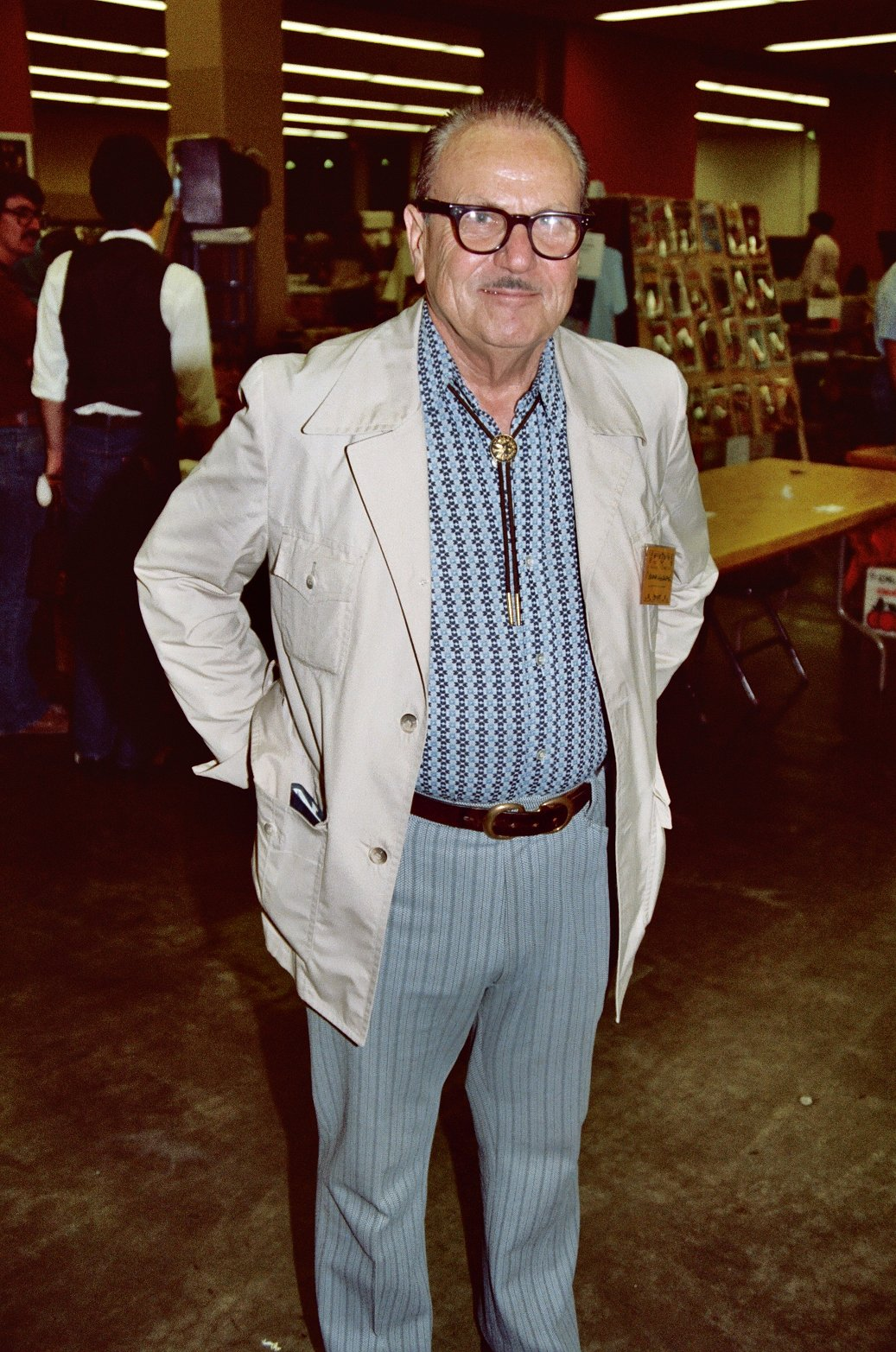
- Burne Hogarth at the 1982 San Diego Comic Con
- Born: Spinoza Bernard Ginsburg; December 25, 1911 Chicago, Illinois, U.S.
- Died: January 28, 1996 (aged 84) Paris, France
- Areas: Artist, educator
- Notable works: Tarzan
- Awards: Inkpot Award (1978)

Burne Hogarth (born Spinoza Bernard Ginsburg, December 25, 1911 – January 28, 1996) was an American artist and educator, best known for his work on the Tarzan newspaper comic strip and his series of anatomy books for artists.

== Early life ==
Hogarth was born in Chicago in 1911, the younger son of Pauline and carpenter Max. He displayed an early talent for drawing. His father saved these efforts and some years later presented them and the young Hogarth to the registrar at the Art Institute of Chicago. At age 12, Hogarth was admitted, embarking on a formal education that took him through such institutions as Chicago's Crane College and Northwestern University, and New York City's Columbia University in New York City – also studying arts and sciences.

Due to his father's early death, Hogarth began work at age 15, when he became the assistant at the Associated Editors Syndicate and illustrated a series called Famous Churches of the World. He worked for several years as an editor and advertising artist. This work provided steady (and, by 1929, crucial) employment. In 1929, he drew his first comic strip, Ivy Hemmanhaw, for the Barnet Brown Company; in 1930 he drew Odd Occupations and Strange Accidents for Ledd Features Syndicate.

As the Great Depression worsened, Hogarth relocated to New York City at the urging of friends. He found employment with King Features Syndicate in 1934, drawing Charles Driscoll's pirate adventure Pieces of Eight (1935). In 1936 came the assignment that catapulted Hogarth's illustration career. With Tarzan, Hogarth brought together classicism, expressionism and narrative into a new form of dynamic, sequential art: the newspaper comic strip. Hogarth drew the Tarzan "Sunday (newspaper comic strip) page" for 12 years (1937–45; 1947–50). This work has been reprinted often, most recently by NBM Publishing.

== Art instruction ==
Almost as long as he was a professional artist, Hogarth was a teacher. Over the years, he was an instructor of drawing to a variety of students at a number of institutions, and by 1944 Hogarth had in mind a school for returning World War II veterans. The Manhattan Academy of Newspaper Art was Hogarth's first formal effort, and by 1947 he had transformed it into the Cartoonists and Illustrators School. This academy continued to grow, and in 1956 was again renamed, as the School of Visual Arts (SVA), now one of the world's leading art schools. Hogarth designed the curriculum, served as an administrator and taught a full schedule that included drawing, writing and art history. Hogarth retired from the SVA in 1970 but continued to teach at the Parsons School of Design and, after a move to Los Angeles, the Otis School and Art Center College of Design in Pasadena.

== Books ==
During his years teaching, Hogarth authored a number of anatomy and drawing books. Dynamic Anatomy (1958) and Drawing the Human Head (1965) were followed by further investigations of the human form. Dynamic Figure Drawing (1970) and Drawing Dynamic Hands (1977) completed the figure cycle. Dynamic Light and Shade (1981) and Dynamic Wrinkles and Drapery (1995) explored other aspects relative to rendering the figure.

== Graphic novels ==
After more than 20 years away from strip work Hogarth returned to sequential art in 1972 with Tarzan of the Apes, a large-format hardbound graphic narrative published by Watson Guptill in 11 languages. He followed with Jungle Tales of Tarzan (1976), integrating previously unattempted techniques such as hidden, covert, and negative space imagery with inspired color themes into a harmonious visual description, a pinnacle of narrative art. These texts, in addition to Hogarth's strip work, exert a pervasive and ongoing influence within the global arts community and among delighted readers everywhere.

His energetic speeches were known for addressing any topic that was thrown at him with a lengthy string of ideas that could cover the French Revolution and amusement parks by way of Postmodernism and graffiti art, meandering through economics and globalization, only to return to an enlightened answer to the original question. In his teaching he was known for a vigorous and surprising approach, which could include instructions such as: "Paint me this sound: a spider walking on his web. What is the music of that sound?"*

== Awards ==
He received recognition for his work in the United States, including the National Cartoonist Society Advertising and Illustration Award for 1975, Magazine and Book Illustration Award for 1992, and Special Features Award for 1974, and dozens of awards internationally. He taught, wrote, created and theorized lucidly and passionately into his last days. For decades he was regularly invited to international events, frequently in a starring capacity.

He was inducted into the Will Eisner Award Hall of Fame in 2010.

== Death ==
During a stay in Paris, France, Hogarth suffered heart failure. He died on January 28, 1996 in the Hôpital Cochin. He had been visiting the city after attending the Angoulême International Comics Festival where he was a guest of honor.

== Publications ==
=== Comics ===
- Tarzan:
  - Tarzan in the City of Gold (Titan Books, Sunday strips from 1937 to 1940)
  - Tarzan Versus the Barbarians (Titan Books, Sunday strips from 1940 to 1943)
  - Tarzan Versus the Nazis (Titan Books, Sunday strips from 1943 to 1947)
  - Tarzan and the Lost Tribes (Titan Books, Sunday strips from 1947 to 1949)
  - Tarzan and the Adventurers (Titan Books, Sunday strips from 1949 to 1950; dailies from 1947 to 1950)
  - Burne Hogarth's Lord of the Jungle (Dark Horse Comics, reprints the graphic novels Tarzan of the Apes and Jungle Tales of Tarzan)
- Miracle Jones
- Drago

=== Non-fiction books ===
Non-fiction books, mainly on the principles of art and design, include:

- Dynamic Anatomy (1958, reprint 2003, ISBN 0-8230-1552-1)
- Drawing the Human Head (1965, reprint, 1989, ISBN 0-8230-1376-6)
- Dynamic Figure Drawing (1970, reprint, 1996, ISBN 0-8230-1577-7)
- Drawing Dynamic Hands (1977, reprint 1988, ISBN 0-8230-1368-5)
- Dynamic Light and Shade (1981, reprint 1992, ISBN 0-8230-1581-5)
- Dynamic Wrinkles and Drapery (1995, ISBN 0-8230-1587-4)

=== Articles ===
Writings:

- "Selecting the Right Art School: The Cartoonist's and Illustrator's Center", The Artist's Monthly

Written by Burne Hogarth, this article details the pitfalls of traditional art school, and points out the benefits of The Cartoonist's and Illustrator's Center (the present-day School of Visual Arts), which he co-founded.

- "A Clash of Two Cultures", American Cinematographer

This article details (among other things) the influence of Burne Hogarth's artwork on Vittorio Storaro, ASC, AIC during the making of Apocalypse Now. From the article: "Storaro's surrealistic treatment of the jungle scenes was partially inspired by the art of Burne Hogarth, whose bold use of color brought the Tarzan comic strip to vivid life during the late 1930s."
