= Studley Oldham Burroughs =

Cartoonist and illustrator

- Born: Studley Oldham Burroughs; December 26, 1892; Chicago, Illinois, United States
- Died: December 23, 1949
- Occupation(s): Cartoonist, Illustrator
- Known for: illustrations for Edgar Rice Burroughs books

Studley Oldham Burroughs was an illustrator and cartoonist. Burroughs drew the comic strip Self Control is a Wonderful Virtue for the Los Angeles Tribune's Sunday Fiction Magazine in 1916. In 1931, he began composing covers for his uncle Edgar Rice Burroughs' new publishing company ERB Inc., including Tarzan the Invincible, Jungle Girl, and Apache Devil.
