= Tarzan and the Lost Empire =

Novel by Edgar Rice Burroughs

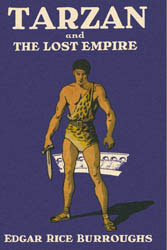
- Dust-jacket illustration of Tarzan and the Lost Empire
- Author: Edgar Rice Burroughs
- Illustrator: A. W. Sperry
- Language: English
- Series: Tarzan series
- Genre: Adventure
- Publisher: Metropolitan Newspaper Services
- Publication date: 1928-1929
- Publication place: United States
- Media type: Print (hardback)
- Pages: iii, 313
- Preceded by: Tarzan, Lord of the Jungle
- Followed by: Tarzan at the Earth's Core
- Text: Tarzan and the Lost Empire at Wikisource

Tarzan and the Lost Empire is a novel by American writer Edgar Rice Burroughs, the twelfth in his series of twenty-four books about the title character Tarzan. The story was first published as a serial in Blue Book Magazine from October 1928 through February 1929; it first appeared in book form in a hardcover edition from Metropolitan Newspaper Services in September 1929. This was the first Edgar Rice Burroughs book not published by A. C. McClurg, with whom Burroughs had cut off business ties due to a dispute over royalties.

== Plot ==
Erich von Harben, a young German specialized in archaeology and dead languages, and with a passion for mountain climbing, starts investigating the legend of The Lost Tribe of the Wiramwazi Mountains, and disappears. His father meets Tarzan and asks for his help.

Tarzan in his search for Erich von Harben finds a lost remnant of the Roman Empire hidden in the mountains of Africa. They are inhabitants of two rival cities, Castra Sanguinarius, ruled by Sublatus Imperator, and Castrum Mare, ruled by Validus Augustus.

Erich von Harben and his only remaining safari guide, Gabula, are captured and brought to Castrum Mare, where they meet Mallius Lepus, who takes Erich to his uncle, Septimus Favonius, introducing him as a barbarian from Germany. Erich von Harben falls in love with Favonia, the daughter of Septimus Favonius, and makes an enemy of Fulvus Fupus.

Tarzan reaches Castra Sanguinarius, the city being ruled by Sublatus Imperator. Trying to get information about von Harben, Tarzan makes an enemy of the Emperor and his son Fastus. Protecting Dilecta, the daughter of Dion Splendidus, from Fastus, he makes a friend out of Maximus Praeclarus, the young patrician officer who brought him to Castra Sanguinarius. Maximus hides him in his house.

Betrayed by a servant, Tarzan and Maximus Praeclarus are captured and chained in the dungeons beneath the Colosseum of Castra Sanguinarius. Here he meets Cassius Hasta, the nephew of Validus Augustus. They fight as gladiators against man and beast and win in the end. Still the emperor does not grant them their freedom. With help of Appius Applosus, a friend of Maximus, they escape and lead a revolution against Sublatus with the help of slaves from the nearby villages and the Waziri, brought by Nkima. Once Sublatus is defeated, Tarzan installs Dion Splendidus as Emperor and leaves for Castrum Mare to find Erich and support Cassius Hasta in ascending to the Throne.

In the meantime Erich von Harben and Mallius Lepus are taken prisoner due to the intrigues of Fulvus Fupus, with no idea of Gabula's whereabouts. They are brought to the arena as participants in the games. Just before the games start, Gabula suddenly appears and slays Sublatus in his imperial loge, and in the confusion Erich and Mallius escape and take refuge in a deserted house near the Colosseum. Favonia, abducted by thieves, is brought by chance to the same location, where Erich and Mallius free her.

Cassius Hasta returns to Castrum Mare together with Tarzan and the Waziri and encounters no resistance, since without Sublatus, Cassius is the rightful ruler. Tarzan finishes this quest by meeting Erich von Harben.

This novel is notable for the introduction of Nkima, who serves as Tarzan's monkey companion in it and a number of later Tarzan stories. It also reintroduces Muviro, first seen in Tarzan and the Golden Lion, as sub-chief of Tarzan's Waziri warriors.

== Comic adaptations ==
The book has been adapted into comic form by Gold Key Comics in Tarzan nos. 194-195, dated February–March 1971, with a script by Gaylord DuBois and art by Paul Norris and Mike Royer (Inker).

| Preceded by Tarzan, Lord of the Jungle | Tarzan series Tarzan and the Lost Empire | Succeeded by Tarzan at the Earth's Core |
