= The Legend of Tarzan (film) =

2016 film directed by David Yates

- Theatrical release poster
- Directed by: David Yates
- Screenplay by: Adam Cozad; Craig Brewer
- Story by: Craig Brewer; Adam Cozad
- Based on: Tarzan stories by Edgar Rice Burroughs
- Produced by: Jerry Weintraub; David Barron; Alan Riche; Tony Ludwig
- Starring: Alexander Skarsgård; Samuel L. Jackson; Margot Robbie; Djimon Hounsou; Christoph Waltz
- Cinematography: Henry Braham
- Edited by: Mark Day
- Music by: Rupert Gregson-Williams
- Production companies: Village Roadshow Pictures; RatPac-Dune Entertainment; Jerry Weintraub Productions; Riche/Ludwig Productions; Beagle Pug Films
- Distributed by: Warner Bros. Pictures
- Release dates: June 27, 2016 (Dolby Theatre); July 1, 2016 (United States); July 6, 2016 (United Kingdom)
- Running time: 110 minutes
- Countries: United Kingdom; United States
- Language: English
- Budget: $180 million
- Box office: $356.7 million

The Legend of Tarzan is a 2016 action adventure film directed by David Yates. Based on the character Tarzan created by Edgar Rice Burroughs, the film features an ensemble cast including Alexander Skarsgård, Samuel L. Jackson, Margot Robbie, Djimon Hounsou, and Christoph Waltz. The story follows John Clayton (Tarzan), who, after moving to London, is convinced by George Washington Williams to return to his former home in the jungles of Africa, to investigate claims of slavery.

Principal photography began on June 21, 2014, at Leavesden Studios in the United Kingdom and wrapped four months later. The film premiered at the Dolby Theatre in Los Angeles on June 29, 2016, and was theatrically released in the United States on July 1, 2016, by Warner Bros. Pictures. It grossed $356.7 million worldwide against a budget of $180 million and received mixed reviews from critics.

== Plot ==
At the Berlin Conference of 1884–1885, King Leopold II of Belgium claims the Congo Basin. Five years later, after accruing massive debts in exploiting the resources of the Congo Free State, Leopold sends his envoy Léon Rom to secure the fabled diamonds of Opar. The expedition is massacred by warriors led by Chief Mbonga, who offers Rom diamonds in exchange for Tarzan.

The man once called "Tarzan", The Rt Hon. John Clayton, Earl of Greystoke, has left Africa for his estate in Britain with his American wife Jane. John's parents survived a shipwreck only to die in Africa, where their child, as a baby, was adopted by the Mangani, a race of apes.

John is offered an invitation from Leopold to visit Boma. The Prime Minister, The 3rd Marquess of Salisbury, and George Washington Williams (the American envoy) explain that Leopold is defaulting on his loans, and a visit from John – whose exploits as Tarzan made him a celebrity – would secure Britain's influence in the Congo. John, however, refuses and leaves the meeting. George later approaches John, reveals his suspicions that Leopold is sanctioning slavery, and persuades John to accompany him to the Congo as a credible witness to discover the truth.

John, Jane, and George journey to the Congo, circumventing Rom and his corrupt financier Mr. Frum, and are welcomed by the Kuba village of Clayton and Jane's youth. Rom and his men arrive during the night and capture the villagers, killing Chief Muviro, taking John prisoner, and taking the Chief's son Wasimbu along with other young men to serve as porters. George rescues John, but Jane and the captive villagers are taken aboard Rom's steamship. Rom turns out to have arranged John's invitation from Leopold to deliver him to Mbonga.

Pursuing the steamship, John, George, and the village's remaining warriors seize a train carrying Belgian and other European soldiers in askari uniforms along with enslaved Congolese. An engineer informs them of Rom's plan to take over the Congo, sanctioned by Leopold: using slave labor, Rom has built forts across the region, linked by railway and river travel, for an army of 20,000 mercenaries soon to arrive. With Leopold bankrupt, Rom needs Opar's diamonds to pay for the army.

Finding documents that will expose Leopold, John and George leave the proof with the Kuba warriors and rescue enslaved people to deliver to Boma. They continue on through Mangani territory. Confronted by the Mangani, John is forced to fight his foster brother Akut, now the alpha male. John loses and is left injured, but he and George are permitted to travel on by Akut.

Jane and Wasimbu escape the steamship and flee into the jungle. Jane sends Wasimbu off to rally the other tribes, knowing that Rom's men will follow her. Jane encounters the Mangani, and Rom's men open fire on them. John arrives, saving some Mangani, including Akut, and pursues Rom, who takes Jane to Mbonga's tribe to collect the diamonds. Years before, Mbonga's son killed John's foster mother Kala. Enraged, John killed him to avenge her. Mbonga attacks John, who wins the fight but spares the chief. George and the Mangani then arrive to stop the fighting, and the two foreigners convince Mbonga that Rom is their common enemy.

Rom takes Jane and the diamonds to Boma, where the mercenary army approaches shore. John and George send a stampede of wildebeest through the town, overrunning Rom's men, as the Kuba warriors arrive by train and free their families. John rescues Jane and pursues Rom, who prepares to deliver the diamonds to Frum and the mercenaries. George sinks the steamship, while Rom attempts to strangle John with his rosary.

Using a mating call to summon crocodiles, John breaks free and leaves Rom to be devoured. As the vessel's boiler explodes, John escapes. Frum and the fleet of mercenaries depart. George returns to London and presents the prime minister with an open letter to Leopold exposing the slavery and abuses of the Congolese people.

One year later, John and Jane have relocated to Africa. They celebrate the birth of their son, and John returns to his rightful place among the great apes as Tarzan.

== Cast ==
- Alexander Skarsgård as John Clayton III, 5th Earl of Greystoke / Tarzan. On his character Tarzan, Skarsgård said, "This is about a man who's holding back; and slowly, as you peel off the layers, he reverts back to a more animalistic state and lets that side of his personality out." To get in Tarzan shape, Skarsgård spent 4 months in a training regimen before filming started and gained 24 pounds. Part of his training was for movement work with choreographer Wayne McGregor.
  - Rory J. Saper as 18-year-old Tarzan
  - Christian Stevens as 5-year-old Tarzan
- Christoph Waltz as Captain Léon Rom, an iron-fisted, government-driven and fighting-adept Belgian official sent by King Leopold II of Belgium to find diamonds and control the region.
- Samuel L. Jackson as George Washington Williams, an American entrepreneur and veteran of the Indian Wars who becomes an ally to Tarzan.
- Margot Robbie as Jane Clayton, Countess of Greystoke, née Porter, Tarzan's feisty and devoted wife.
  - Ella Purnell as Young Jane Porter body double (uncredited)
- Djimon Hounsou as Chief Mbonga, the leader of the leopard men of Opar (an African tribe that controls the diamond region), who wants revenge against Tarzan for the death of his son.
- Jim Broadbent as The 3rd Marquess of Salisbury, the British Prime Minister.
- Casper Crump as Major Kerckhover, Rom's violent first lieutenant
- Ben Chaplin as Captain Moulle
- Hadley Fraser as John Clayton II, 4th Earl of Greystoke (Tarzan's father)
- Genevieve O'Reilly as Alice Clayton, Countess of Greystoke (Tarzan's mother)
- Yule Masiteng as Muviro, the chieftain of the Kuba people
- Mimi Ndiweni as Eshe
- Simon Russell Beale as Mr. Frum

== Production ==
=== Development ===
An updated version of Tarzan had been in the works since at least 2003, with John August writing followed by John Collee in 2006 with Guillermo del Toro slated to direct. Del Toro dropped out to work on The Hobbit and by 2008, it was reported that a different version of Tarzan, co-written by Stephen Sommers and Stuart Beatle, that was said to resemble the Pirates of the Caribbean series, was in development. By 2011, Craig Brewer, who also rewrote a version of the script, was set to direct the film, although this did not come to pass. Instead, David Yates was chosen to direct in 2012. Other directors in the running included Susanna White and Gary Ross. In April 2013, it was reported that the production was temporarily suspended due to budgetary concerns.

=== Casting ===
For a while, producer Jerry Weintraub wanted swimmer Michael Phelps to play the title role, feeling that he was the heir apparent to Johnny Weissmuller, the actor who had famously played Tarzan, and who was also a prominent competitive swimmer. Weintraub reportedly changed his mind after watching Phelps host Saturday Night Live, for only two minutes. Other early contenders for the role included Henry Cavill, Tom Hardy, and Charlie Hunnam. On November 14, 2012, Alexander Skarsgård was cast in the title role, the choice of director Yates, while Samuel L. Jackson was being eyed to play Williams in the film. Yates found Skarsgård to be the perfect Tarzan. He liked that he was born in Sweden but had found a career in America, so "he has this wonderful quality of not quite belonging to one or the other", he said. On March 6, 2013, it was reported that Yates wanted Jessica Chastain to play Jane Porter. On September 26, 2013, Christoph Waltz was in talks to play the villain in the film; he was later cast, as Captain Rom.

The studio eyed Margot Robbie and Emma Stone to play the female lead character, Jane Porter. Emma Watson, Sarah Bolger, Georgina Haig, Lucy Hale, Lyndsy Fonseca, Eleanor Tomlinson, Gabriella Wilde, Lucy Boynton and Cressida Bonas were all considered for the part. On January 18, 2014, Robbie was cast in the film, opposite Skarsgård, beating Stone for the role. On June 4, Djimon Hounsou was set to play Chief Mbonga in the film. On June 17, Osy Ikhile was added to the cast to play a supporting role, but the character was not then named. Casper Crump was cast to play Captain Kerchover. The release of the first trailer in December 2015 revealed that Jim Broadbent was also part of the cast.

=== Filming ===
Principal photography on the film commenced on June 30, 2014, at Warner Bros. Studios in Leavesden, Hertfordshire, England. Filming had begun on the day an announcement was made for the expansion of the studio. Filming wrapped the same year on October 3. Filming took place for a total of 70 days. According to The Wall Street Journal, shooting the film in Africa would have made the budget even higher.

Making Africa seem authentic was especially important to the filmmakers, since the film was shot in England, except for six weeks in Gabon, filming background by helicopter without the cast. A working waterfall and a 100-foot-long collapsible pier were assembled at Warner Bros.' Leavesden studios. Seven versions of the African jungle were constructed to show different scenery throughout the filming. Plants from Holland were mixed with trees sculpted by the art department. Kedleston Hall in Derbyshire stood in for the Greystoke Manor, and a cedar tree on the grounds of Highclere Castle served as the setting for an early pivotal scene between Tarzan and Jane.

== Soundtrack ==
The film's score was composed by Rupert Gregson-Williams. The soundtrack was released on June 24, 2016, by WaterTower Music and on CD on July 15, 2016. Tony Clarke, Thomas Farnon, and Tom Howe are credited for additional music. Hozier provided a single, "Better Love", which is played at the film's end credits.

== Release ==
The film was released on July 1, 2016, by Warner Bros., in standard formats as well as RealD 3D, IMAX 3D, and 4DX.

=== Home media ===
The film was released on October 11, 2016, in standard formats, DVD, Blu-ray, Blu-ray 3D and 4K Blu-ray.

== Reception ==
=== Box office ===
The Legend of Tarzan grossed $126.6 million in the United States and Canada and $230.1 million in other territories, for a worldwide total of $356.7 million. Given its $180 million production budget, it would have had to earn at least $400 million to break even and justify a sequel. Deadline Hollywood's financial analysts stated that Warner Bros. lost an estimated $40 million on the film, although the studio itself asserted the film broke even.

In the United States and Canada, The Legend of Tarzan opened alongside The BFG and The Purge: Election Year, and was projected to gross to $25–33 million in its opening weekend. It opened Friday, July 1, 2016, across 3,561 theaters and 6,700 screens, and grossed $14 million on its opening day, including $1.4 million in IMAX showings. This includes $2.6 million it made from Thursday night previews. In its opening weekend, buoyed by positive word of mouth, the film grossed a better-than-expected $38.5 million, of which IMAX contributed $3.9 million, and $46.6 million over its four-day Independence Day holiday frame, finishing second place at the box office behind Finding Dory, but first among new releases. However, despite its opening numbers, Deadline called the film a "dud", due to its lofty budget.

Internationally, The Legend of Tarzan received a scattered release pattern, in order to take advantage of the competitive landscape surrounding the UEFA Euro 2016. It is likely that a recoup of the film's hefty production budget will be dependent on international audiences and returns. Jeff Goldstein, Warner's executive vice president of domestic distribution, told The New York Times, "This property has always really been about the international opportunity." The film opened across 19 markets on the same weekend it debuted in North America, including major territories like Russia and South Korea. In its opening weekend, it grossed $19.3 million on about 6,700 screens, and an IMAX total of $1.2 million from 122 IMAX theaters. In Russia and the CIS, it opened with $3.1 million, debuting in first place at the box office. However, it was the lowest No. 1 opening for a film since April, while in South Korea it debuted at No. 2, with $4 million. In the latter market, it faced significant competition from local films Familyhood and The Hunt, both of which performed strongly. In the United Kingdom and Ireland, it came in second place with $4.7 million, including previews, debuting behind the animated The Secret Life of Pets, and in Australia with $3.2 million, behind Finding Dory. Elsewhere, Asia had No. 1 openings in India, Indonesia, Thailand and Malaysia. The studio also reported No. 1 debuts in Mexico ($4.6 million), Brazil ($3.4 million), Spain ($1.8 million), Italy ($1.6 million), the majority of Eastern European markets, and Puerto Rico. Germany ($2 million), the UAE ($1.6 million), and Japan ($1.5 million) had similar opening figures.

In China – the film's second biggest market – the film was granted a rare release date in the month of July, a peculiar move since July is typically the month when Chinese regulators ban foreign films (including Hollywood films) in order to protect and promote their own local films. It opened on Tuesday, July 19, and made $7 million on its opening day. It went on to deliver a six-day opening of around $27 million and a three-day weekend opening of $12 million. Although the opening number was regarded strong, it came in second place, behind Skiptrace, which occupied a market share in excess of 56%, in comparison to The Legend of Tarzan's 16%.

In terms of total earnings, its biggest markets outside of the United States are China ($45.1 million), Mexico ($13.7 million) and the U.K. and Ireland ($11.9 million).

=== Critical response ===
On Rotten Tomatoes, the film has an approval rating of 36% based on 258 reviews with an average rating of 5.1/10. The website's critical consensus reads, "The Legend of Tarzan has more on its mind than many movies starring the classic character, but that isn't enough to make up for its generic plot or sluggish pace." On Metacritic, the film has a weighted average score of 44 out of 100 based on 41 critics, indicating "mixed or average reviews". Audiences polled by CinemaScore gave the film an average grade of "A−" on an A+ to F scale.

Manohla Dargis of The New York Times gave the film a positive review, stating "What makes it more enjoyable than a lot of recycled stories of this type is that the filmmakers have given Tarzan a thoughtful, imperfect makeover." In his review, Peter Travers of Rolling Stone stated "At least it's watchable. In summer, baby, that's high praise."

Peter Debruge of Variety gave the film a negative review, stating "A talky and mostly turgid attempt by British director David Yates to build on the epic vision he brought to the final four Harry Potter movies via another beloved literary hero." Jordan Hoffman of The Guardian criticized the film for its story and writing, stating "Committed performances aren't enough to save this film from uncomfortable colonial optics, uninspiring CGI and tedious plotlines." He called out the film for trying to make the source material politically correct while simultaneously being a white saviour narrative.

=== Accolades ===
Award	Date of ceremony	Category	Recipient(s)	Result	Ref(s)
Alliance of Women Film Journalists	December 21, 2016	Actress Most in Need of a New Agent	Margot Robbie (also for Suicide Squad)	Nominated	
Jupiter Awards	March 29, 2017	Best International Actress	Margot Robbie	Nominated	
Saturn Awards	June 28, 2017	Best Action or Adventure Film	The Legend of Tarzan	Nominated	

== See also ==
- List of films featuring slavery
- Tarzan in film and other non-print media
