= Jungle Tales of Tarzan =

Short story collection by Edgar Rice Burroughs

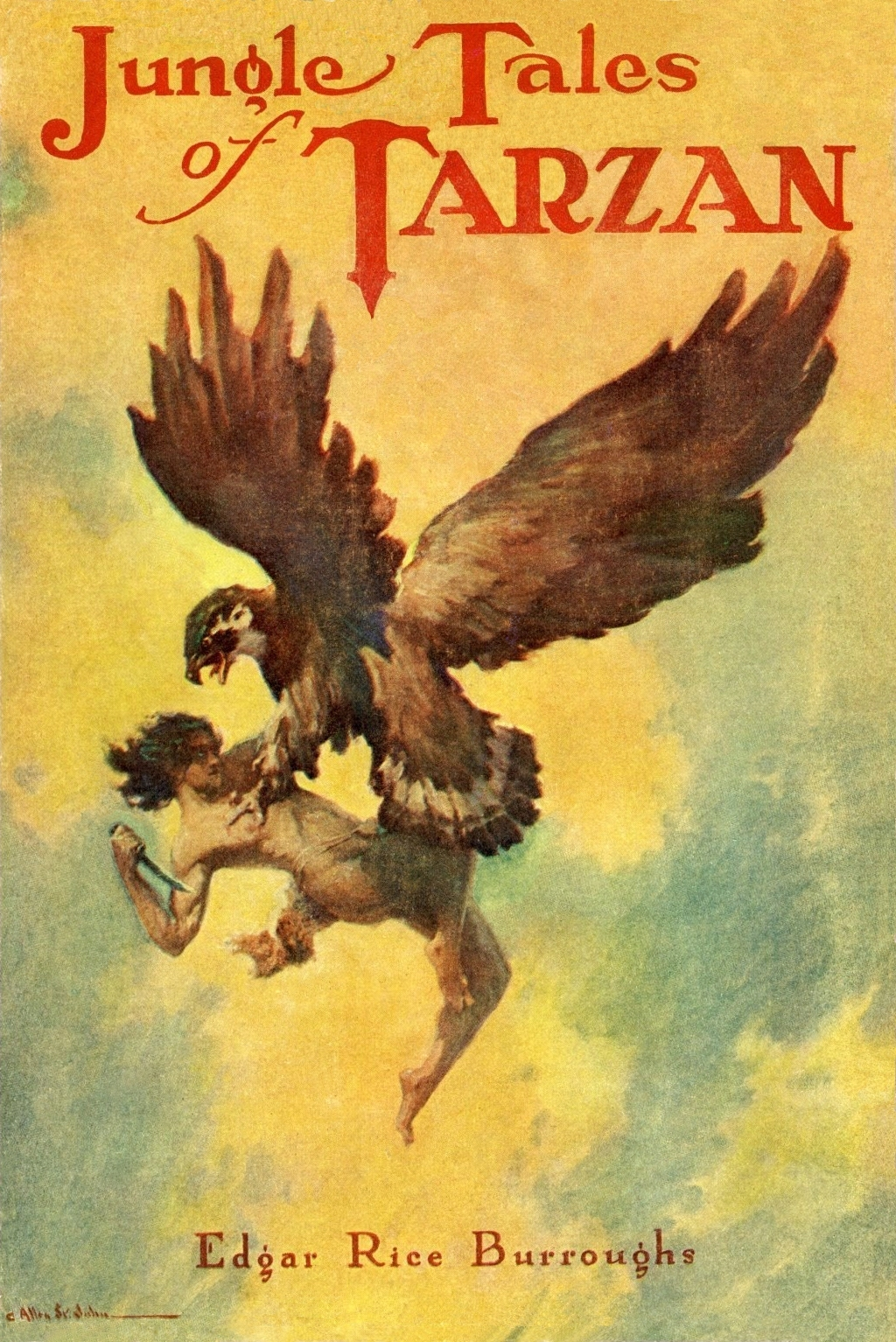
- Dust-jacket illustration of Jungle Tales of Tarzan
- Author: Edgar Rice Burroughs
- Language: English
- Series: Tarzan series
- Genre: Adventure
- Publisher: A. C. McClurg
- Publication date: 1916–1917
- Publication place: United States
- Media type: Print (hardback)
- Pages: 319 pp
- Preceded by: Tarzan and the Jewels of Opar
- Followed by: Tarzan the Untamed
- Text: Jungle Tales of Tarzan at Wikisource

Jungle Tales of Tarzan is a collection of twelve loosely connected short stories by American writer Edgar Rice Burroughs, comprising the sixth book in order of publication in his series of twenty-four books about the title character Tarzan. Chronologically the events recounted in it occur within Chapter 11 of the first Tarzan novel, Tarzan of the Apes, between Tarzan's avenging of his ape foster mother's death and his becoming leader of his ape tribe. The stories ran monthly in Blue Book magazine, September 1916 through August 1917 before book publication in 1919.

== Contents ==
The book is a collection of 12 loosely connected short stories of Tarzan's late teenage years, set within a year or two before Tarzan first sees white people including Jane Porter. According to Tarzan Alive, Philip José Farmer's study of the ape man's life and career, the incidents of this book occurred from February, 1907-August, 1908 (aside from the eclipse incident in the final tale, there apparently having been no such eclipse visible from equatorial Africa during this period).

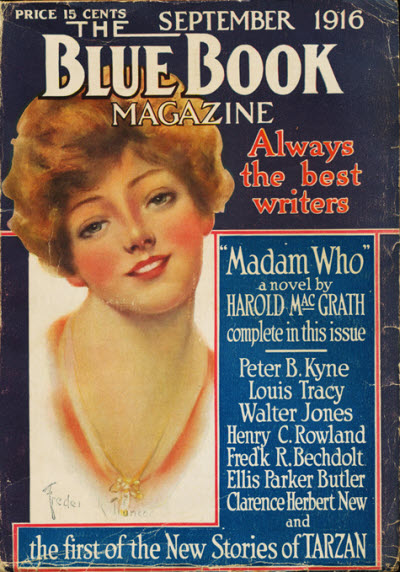
Cover of Blue Book issue featuring "Tarzan's First Love"

- "Tarzan's First Love". Tarzan's courtship of the female ape Teeka ends in failure when her preference turns to their mutual friend, the male ape Taug. Tarzan wrestles with his humanness versus his ape-ness. The allusion to Helen of Troy enriches the story, making Tarzan and Taug's fight over Teeka take on symbolic proportions. Stan Galloway writes: "when Burroughs chooses to name Helen as an objective correlative for Teeka, he expects both literal and emotional connections to occur." Tarzan's final claim of the story—"Tarzan is a man. He will go alone."—echoes the plight of Adam in the Garden of Eden.
- "The Capture of Tarzan". Tarzan is taken captive by the warriors of a village of cannibals which has established a village near the territory of the ape tribe. He is saved from them by Tantor, the elephant.
- "The Fight for the Balu". Teeka and Taug have a baby (balu, in the ape language), which Teeka names Gazan and will not allow Tarzan near. She changes her mind after Tarzan saves the baby from a leopard.
- "The God of Tarzan". Tarzan discovers the concept of "God" in the books preserved in the cabin of his deceased parents, to which he pays regular visits. He inquires among members of his ape tribe for further elucidation without success, and continues his investigation among the cannibals of the nearby village and the natural phenomena of his world, such as the sun and moon. Eventually he concludes that God is none of these, but the creative force permeating everything. Somehow, though, the dreaded snake Histah falls outside this.
- "Tarzan and the Black Boy". Jealous of Taug and Teeka's relationship with their baby, Tarzan kidnaps Tibo, a little boy from the neighboring village to be his own "balu". He tries with indifferent success to teach the terrified and homesick child ape ways. Meanwhile, Momaya, Tibo's mother does everything she can think of to find and recover her son, even visiting the hermit witch-doctor Bukawai, a terrible, diseased exile who keeps two fearsome hyenas as pets. He names a price for recovering Tibo she cannot afford, and she leaves disappointed. Afterwards, however, Tarzan, who is moved by Tibo's distress and his mother's love, returns the boy to her.
- "The Witch-Doctor Seeks Vengeance". Bukawai attempts to claim credit for Tibo's return and extort payment from the boy's mother, but is rebuffed. He plots vengeance against the native family and Tarzan, but is thwarted by the ape man. In this story Tarzan's life in the wild is contrasted with scenes from the civilized existence of his cousin in England, living the life he might have had had his parents not been marooned in Africa. The cousin does not shine in the comparison.

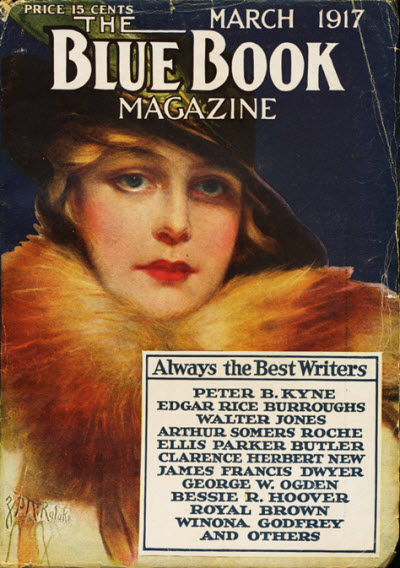
Cover of Blue Book issue featuring "The End of Bukawai"

- "The End of Bukawai". Bukawai, finding Tarzan unconscious after a storm, takes the ape man captive and stakes him out for his hyenas to devour. Escaping, Tarzan leaves the witch doctor in the same trap, in which Bukawai suffers the very fate he had intended for his enemy.
- "The Lion". Tarzan vainly attempts to impress on his ape tribe the necessity of maintaining a strict watch against the hazards and perils surrounding them. To drive home the lesson, he dons a lionskin he has taken from Mbonga's village and suddenly appears among them, only to find them more vigilant than he had thought, as they mob him and nearly beat him to death. He is saved only by the courage of his monkey friend Manu, which he had also previously underrated, who risks all to reveal to Teeka and Taug that the "lion" is actually Tarzan.
- "The Nightmare". Having been unsuccessful hunting, Tarzan robs the native village of some rotten elephant meat, which he eats. Becoming ill from the tainted meal, he has a horrible nightmare, in which he dreams himself menaced by a lion, an eagle, and huge snake with the head of a village native. He is carried off by a giant bird but wakes in the fall from its grasp, finding himself back in the tree where he'd gone to sleep. He realizes the incidents were not real. Subsequently attacked by a gorilla, he assumes that this too is a product of his fevered imagination, until actually wounded and hurt. He kills the beast, but is left to wonder what is real and what is fantasy. The only thing he is certain of is that he will never again eat the meat of an elephant.
- "The Battle for Teeka". Discovering bullet cartridges in his deceased father's cabin, Tarzan takes them with him as curios. Subsequently, Teeka is taken by an ape from another tribe, and Tarzan and Taug join forces to trail the kidnapper and rescue her. When they catch up, they are surrounded by the enemy tribe and nearly overwhelmed, until Teeka throws the cartridges at their foes in an apparently futile effort to help. When some of them hit a rock, they explode, frightening the hostile apes and saving her "rescuers".
- "A Jungle Joke". As part of his campaign of torment and trickery against the native village, whose members he holds responsible for his ape foster mother's death, Tarzan captures Rabba Kega, the local witch doctor, and puts him in a trap the natives have set to catch a lion. The next day the warriors find they have caught the lion, but it has killed the witch doctor. They take the lion to the village. Tarzan secretly releases it and appears among them dressed in the lionskin he had previously used to trick the apes. Dropping the disguise, he reveals himself and leaves. When the natives muster enough courage, they follow, only to encounter the real lion, which they assume is Tarzan in his disguise again. They are quickly disabused.

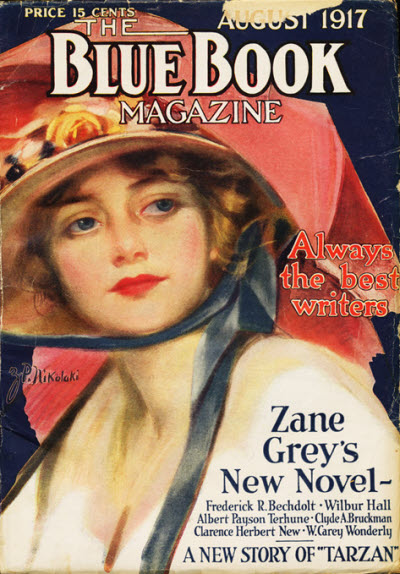
Cover of Blue Book issue featuring "Tarzan Rescues the Moon".

- "Tarzan Rescues the Moon". Tarzan frees a native warrior the apes have caught on being impressed by the man's bravery, angering the rest of the ape tribe. Alienated, he exiles himself to his parents' cabin. Later, frightened by an eclipse in which darkness appears to devour the moon, they summon him back. Tarzan reassures them by shooting arrows at the "devourer", and as the eclipse passes is given credit by the creatures for the "rescue".

== Characters in order of appearance ==
- Tarzan
- Teeka
- Taug
- Sheeta
- Tantor
- Buto
- Mumga
- Numgo
- Mbonga
- Histah
- Tibo
- Bukawai
- Sabor
- Momaya
- William Cecil Clayton
- Tublat
- Kala
- Rabba Kega
- Manu
- Gunto
- Toog
- Gazan
- Numa

== Critical reception ==
Erling B. Holtsmark explores these stories topically in Tarzan and Tradition along with the first five Tarzan novels. The book is indexed to provide help in locating the commentary on each story.

Stan Galloway's The Teenage Tarzan: A Literary Analysis of Edgar Rice Burroughs' Jungle Tales of Tarzan provides the first extended study of this collection of short stories. The Teenage Tarzan explores each story, usually in the order of composition, with references to Tarzan of the Apes and other books written by Burroughs. The study includes reference to other media as well, where Tarzan is a character, and a particular interest in literary symbols at work in the stories. Galloway's book also contains a useful index.

Both Holtsmark and Galloway approach the stories seriously and positively, providing a counter to a largely dismissive earlier reception.

== Anthology reprints ==
Galloway records that "Tarzan's First Love" has been reprinted in Love Stories, edited by Martin Levin and High Adventure, edited by Cynthia Manson and Charles Ardai.

Galloway records that "The Battle for Teeka" also appeared in Ellery Queen's Mystery Magazine in May 1964 as well as Ellery Queen's 1970 Anthology (1969).

== Adaptations in comics ==
Stories from the book have been adapted into comic form on a number of occasions.

Charlton Comics adapted eight of the stories, including "The Capture of Tarzan", "The Fight for the Balu", "The Battle for Teeka", "Tarzan Rescues the Moon", "The Nightmare", "The God of Tarzan", "The Lion" and "A Jungle Joke" in Jungle Tales of Tarzan nos. 1-4, dated December 1964-June 1965.

Gold Key Comics adapted four of the stories, including "The Capture of Tarzan", "The God of Tarzan", "Tarzan and the Black Boy" and "A Jungle Joke" in Tarzan nos. 169-170, dated July–August 1967, with scripts by Gaylord DuBois and art by Alberto Giolitti.

DC Comics adapted three of the stories, including "The Capture of Tarzan", "The Fight for the Balu" and "The Nightmare" in Tarzan nos. 212-214, dated September–November 1972, reprinting the second in two parts in Tarzan nos. 252-253, dated August–September 1976, and the third in Tarzan no. 257, dated January 1977.

Burne Hogarth, illustrator and former Tarzan comic strip artist, adapted four of the stories, including "Tarzan's First Love", "The Capture of Tarzan", "The God of Tarzan" and "The Nightmare" in his showcase graphic novel Jungle Tales of Tarzan (1976), a follow-up to his earlier graphic novel Tarzan of the Apes (1972), which adapted the original Tarzan novel.

Marvel Comics adapted seven of the stories, including "Tarzan Rescues the Moon", "The God of Tarzan", "The Lion", "A Jungle Joke" and "The Battle for Teeka" in Tarzan, Lord of the Jungle nos. 7, 9, and 12-14, dated December 1977, February 1978, and May–July 1978, as well as "Tarzan's First Love" and "The End of Bukawai" in Tarzan Annual no. 1, dated December 1977.

Malibu Comics adapted one of the stories, "Tarzan's First Love", in Tarzan: Love, Lies...and the Lost City no. 1, 1992.

Sequential Pulp adapted all the tales for Dark Horse Comics in 2015 in a graphic album.

Preceded by Tarzan and the Jewels of Opar	Tarzan series Jungle Tales of Tarzan	Succeeded by Tarzan the Untamed
