= The Beasts of Tarzan =

1914 novel by Edgar Rice Burroughs

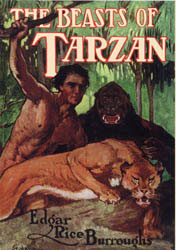
- Dust-jacket illustration of The Beasts of Tarzan
- Author: Edgar Rice Burroughs
- Language: English
- Series: Tarzan series
- Genre: Adventure
- Publisher: A. C. McClurg
- Publication date: 1914
- Publication place: United States
- Media type: Print (hardback)
- Pages: 336
- Preceded by: The Return of Tarzan
- Followed by: The Son of Tarzan
- Text: The Beasts of Tarzan at Wikisource

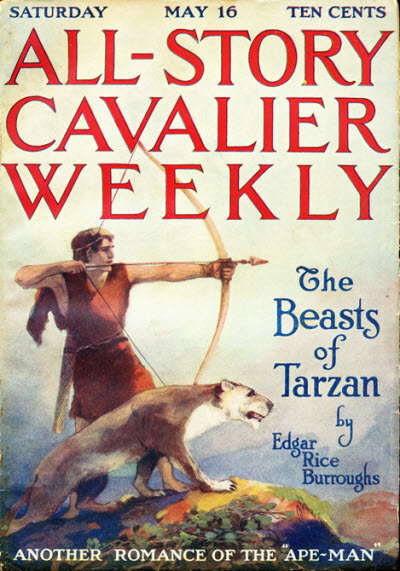
The Beasts of Tarzan was serialized in All Story in 1914.

The Beasts of Tarzan is a novel by American writer Edgar Rice Burroughs, the third in his series of twenty-four books about the title character Tarzan. Originally serialized in All-Story Cavalier magazine in 1914, the novel was first published in book form by A. C. McClurg in 1916.

== Plot summary ==
The story begins a year after the conclusion of the previous book. Tarzan (Lord Greystoke) and Jane have had a son, John "Jack" Clayton III. Tarzan has acclimated to his new status as an English nobleman but has been spending considerable time and money establishing a private estate in Central Africa, intending to retire there in his old age.

Tarzan's adversaries from the previous novel, Nikolas Rokoff and Alexis Paulvitch, escape prison and kidnap the Greystoke heir from his ancestral home in England. Their trap is elaborate and insidious, leading both Tarzan and Jane to be kidnapped as well. Rokoff exiles Tarzan on a jungle island, informing him that Jack will be left with a cannibal tribe to be raised as one of their own, while Jane's fate is to be left to his imagination.

Using his jungle skill and primal intelligence, Tarzan wins the help of Sheeta, the vicious panther, a tribe of great apes led by the intelligent Akut, and the native wanderer Mugambi. With their aid, Tarzan reaches the mainland and begins a lengthy pursuit to find Jane (who is actively engineering her own extrication) and Jack.

By the end of the story, Jack has been rescued, Rokoff has been killed by Sheeta, and Paulvitch is presumed dead but manages to escape into the jungle. The family returns to London along with Mugambi, who takes charge of Tarzan's Waziri estate.

== Comic adaptations ==
The book has been adapted into comic form by Gold Key Comics in Tarzan no. 157, dated January 1967, with a script by Gaylord DuBois and art by Russ Manning.
