= Tarzan the Invincible =

Novel by Edgar Rice Burroughs

- Dust-jacket illustration of Tarzan the Invincible
- Author: Edgar Rice Burroughs
- Illustrator: Studley O. Burroughs
- Language: English
- Series: Tarzan series
- Genre: Adventure
- Publisher: Edgar Rice Burroughs, Inc.
- Publication date: 1930-1931
- Publication place: United States
- Media type: Print (hardback)
- Pages: 318
- Preceded by: Tarzan at the Earth's Core
- Followed by: Tarzan Triumphant

Tarzan the Invincible is a novel by American writer Edgar Rice Burroughs, the fourteenth in his series of twenty-four books about the title character Tarzan. The novel was originally serialized in the magazine Blue Book from October, 1930 through April, 1931 as Tarzan, Guard of the Jungle.

== Plot summary ==
Tarzan, his monkey friend Nkima, and Chief Muviro and his faithful Waziri warriors prevent Soviet communists from looting the lost city of Opar. The story also prominently features Tarzan's elephant friend Tantor and lion ally Jad-bal-ja.

Due to Tarzan's earlier expeditions to Opar, rumors of the lost city's existence have become widespread enough that a Communist-led expedition heads there, seeking its gold to finance a plot to embroil France and Italy in a colonial war. Tarzan, discovering their presence and purpose in his domain, arrives in Opar ahead of them, only to find his ally Queen La overthrown and her treacherous subordinate Oah in power as high priestess, supported by Dooth, successor to La's deceased enemy Cadj. Tarzan frees La, and eventually, after various adventures, he and his Waziri warriors thwart the Communist plot and again restore La to her position. Oah and Dooth both perish.

This book marks the last appearance of Opar and La in the Tarzan series, aside from the juvenile piece Tarzan and the Tarzan Twins with Jad-Bal-Ja the Golden Lion (1936), which was published later but is chronologically earlier.

== Comic adaptations ==
The book has been adapted into comic form by Gold Key Comics in Tarzan nos. 182–183, dated February–March 1970, with a script by Gaylord DuBois and art by Doug Wildey.

Preceded by Tarzan at the Earth's Core	Tarzan series Tarzan the Invincible	Succeeded by Tarzan Triumphant
