= The Return of Tarzan =

1913 novel by Edgar Rice Burroughs

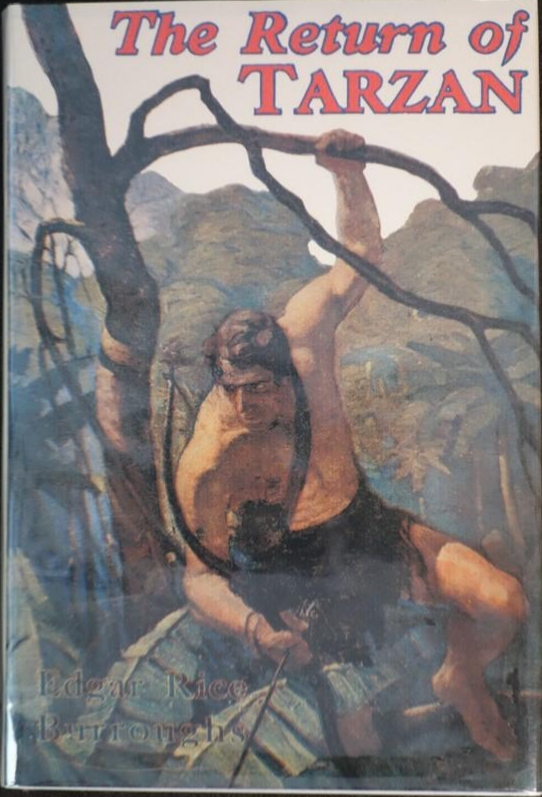
- Dust-jacket illustration of The Return of Tarzan by N. C. Wyeth
- Author: Edgar Rice Burroughs
- Illustrator: J. Allen St. John
- Language: English
- Series: Tarzan series
- Genre: Adventure
- Publisher: A. C. McClurg
- Publication date: 1913
- Publication place: United States
- Media type: Print (hardback)
- Pages: 365
- OCLC: 12570090
- Preceded by: Tarzan of the Apes
- Followed by: The Beasts of Tarzan
- Text: The Return of Tarzan at Wikisource

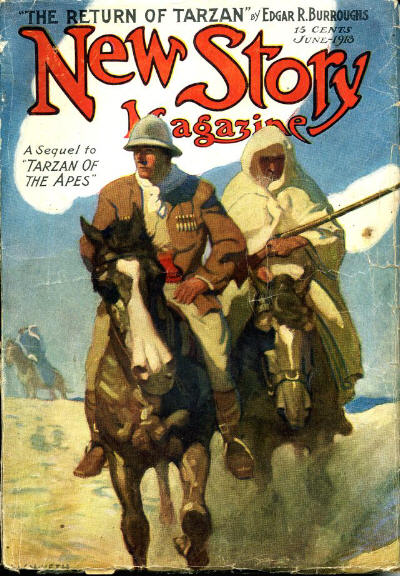
The Return of Tarzan was serialized in New Story Magazine in 1913.

The Return of Tarzan is a novel by American writer Edgar Rice Burroughs, the second in his series of twenty-four books about the title character Tarzan. The story was first published in the pulp magazine New Story Magazine in the issues for June through December 1913; the first book edition was published in 1915 by A. C. McClurg.

== Plot summary ==
Tarzan, feeling rootless in the wake of sacrificing his prospects of wedding Jane Porter, (Note: As depicted in Tarzan of the Apes.) leaves the United States for Europe to visit his friend Paul d'Arnot. On the ship he becomes embroiled in the affairs of Countess Olga de Coude, her husband, Count Raoul de Coude, and a pair of cruel extortionists, Nikolas Rokoff and his henchman Alexis Paulovitch. Rokoff is actually Olga's brother. Tarzan thwarts the villains' scheme, making them his deadly enemies.

Arriving in France, Rokoff makes a number of attempts on Tarzan's life, eventually engineering a duel between the ape man and Raoul by making it appear that the former is Olga's lover. Tarzan refuses to defend himself in the duel, even offering his pistol to Raoul after the latter fails to kill him with his own. This gesture convinces Raoul of Tarzan's innocence, and since the ape-man finds himself without a purpose, arranges for him to join French military intelligence. Tarzan is assigned to service in French Algeria.

A sequence of adventures among the locals ensues, including another brush with Rokoff. Afterward, Tarzan sails to Cape Town, Union of South Africa and strikes up a shipboard acquaintance with Hazel Strong, Jane's best friend. Rokoff and Paulovitch, having stowed away on the ship, finally manage to overpower Tarzan and throw him overboard with heavy weights.

Tarzan frees himself and manages to swim to shore. He quickly realizes that the area is in fact the coastal jungle where he grew up. A brave rescue of Busuli, a warrior of the Waziri tribe, ends with Tarzan being formally adopted as a member. When the Waziri chieftain is killed by encroaching ivory poachers, Tarzan drives them off. The Waziri then elect him to be their new chief.

The Waziri know of a lost city deep in the jungle, from which they have obtained their golden ornaments. Tarzan has them take him there, but is captured by its inhabitants, a race of primitive men, and is condemned to be sacrificed to their sun god. La, high priestess of the lost city of Opar, is to perform the sacrifice and speaks the ape language Tarzan learned as a child. When the sacrificial ceremony is interrupted, she hides Tarzan and promises to lead him to freedom. But Tarzan escapes on his own, locates a treasure chamber, and rejoins the Waziri.

Meanwhile, Hazel reaches Cape Town, meeting Jane. With Jane is her father, Professor Porter, and her fiancé, Tarzan's cousin William Cecil Clayton. They are soon invited to cruise up the west coast of Africa aboard the Lady Alice, the steam yacht of another friend, Lord Tennington. Rokoff, now using the alias of "M. Thuran", ingratiates himself with the party and is invited along. The Lady Alice eventually breaks down and sinks, forcing the passengers and crew into the lifeboats. The one containing Jane, Clayton and "Thuran" is separated from the others and suffers privations. Coincidentally, the boat makes shore in the same general area that Tarzan did.

After weeks of near-starvation and misery from sleeping in a crude shelter, Jane attempts to hunt for meat but soon runs into a lion. Clayton reveals his cowardice and abandons Jane, but the lion is suddenly killed by a thrown spear. Their hidden savior is in fact Tarzan, who does not reveal himself due to anger at seeing Jane with Clayton. Tarzan rejects his humanity, abandoning the Waziri and returning to his original ape clan. Jane breaks off her engagement to Clayton, no longer able to hide her true love for Tarzan.

Jane is then kidnapped and taken to Opar by a war party sent to find Tarzan. The ape man learns of Jane's capture and tracks them, saving her from being sacrificed by La, who is crushed by Tarzan's spurning of her for Jane. Clayton tries to go after her but is soon struck down by illness. Thuran discovers other survivors from the Lady Alice who came to shore some miles away. He leads them away from Clayton and lies that he is the only survivor of his lifeboat.

Tarzan and Jane return to Jane's shelter, along the way encountering Busuli who asks him to return to the Waziri. They find Clayton on the verge of death; before dying, he formally passes the title of Lord Greystoke to Tarzan. Tarzan and Jane return to his boyhood cabin and bury Clayton alongside his aunt and uncle. There, they encounter the castaways, who have been recovered by D'Arnot in a French navy vessel. Tarzan exposes Thuran as Rokoff and the French arrest him.

Tarzan weds Jane and Tennington weds Hazel in a double ceremony performed by Professor Porter, who had been ordained a minister in his youth. Busuli and the Waziri accept gifts from the French and depart with heavy hearts. The newly christened Lord Greystoke departs for England with the others, along with a sizable amount of treasure from Opar.

== Film, TV or theatrical adaptations ==
Burroughs' novel was the basis of two movies, the silent films The Revenge of Tarzan (1920) and The Adventures of Tarzan (1921), based on the first and second parts of the book, respectively. The first film starred Gene Pollar as the ape man, and the second Elmo Lincoln, the original movie Tarzan.

Nikolas Rokoff and Alexis appears in The Legend of Tarzan, in the episode "Tarzan and the Buried Treasure".

== Comic adaptations ==
The book has been adapted into comic form on a number of occasions, both in the original Tarzan comic strip and comic books. Notable adaptations include those of Gold Key Comics in Tarzan no. 156, dated November 1966 (script by Gaylord DuBois, art by Russ Manning), of DC Comics in Tarzan nos. 219–223, dated April–September 1973, and of Dynamite Entertainment in Lord of the Jungle nos. 9-14, dated 2012-2013.

== Media references ==
Science fiction writer and Burroughs enthusiast Philip José Farmer later took up the city of Opar, as appearing in this and later Tarzan novels, and wrote the novels Hadon of Ancient Opar (1974) and Flight to Opar (1976), depicting the city in its full glory many thousands of years in the past.

== Notes ==
Preceded by Tarzan of the Apes	Tarzan series The Return of Tarzan	Succeeded by The Beasts of Tarzan
