= Jane Porter (Tarzan) =

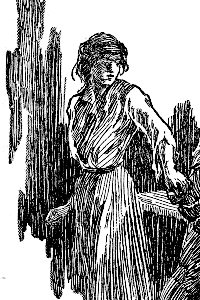
- Early depiction by J. Allen St. John from The Beasts of Tarzan (1st edition, 1916)
- First appearance: Tarzan of the Apes
- Last appearance: Tarzan the Magnificent
- Created by: Edgar Rice Burroughs

In-universe information
- Alias: Jane Clayton
- Species: Human
- Gender: Female
- Title(s): Lady Greystoke, Chieftess of the Waziri
- Spouse: Tarzan (husband)
- Children: Korak (son)
- Relatives: Prof. Archimedes Q. Porter (father); Mrs. Porter (mother; first name unknown); Meriem (daughter-in-law); Jackie (grandson)
- Nationality: American/British

Jane Porter (later Jane Clayton, Lady Greystoke) is a fictional character in Edgar Rice Burroughs's series of Tarzan novels and in adaptations of the saga to other media, particularly film. Jane, an American from Baltimore, Maryland, is the daughter of explorer and anthropologist Archimedes Q. Porter. She becomes the love interest, later the wife of Tarzan and subsequently the mother of their son, Korak.

Jane's character develops over the course of the series. Introduced as a well-educated but naive young woman, she is initially a damsel in distress, frequently placed in dangerous situations from which Tarzan must rescue her. Subsequent stories show her gradually learning combat and survival skills from her husband and enduring harsh regions like the Congo Basin, to the point where she becomes fully capable of surviving entirely on her own.

== In the novels ==
Jane first appeared in the initial Tarzan novel Tarzan of the Apes (1912) then later reappeared in:

- The Return of Tarzan (1913)
- The Beasts of Tarzan (1914)
- The Son of Tarzan (1914)
- Tarzan and the Jewels of Opar (1916)
- Tarzan the Untamed (1920)
- Tarzan the Terrible (1921)
- Tarzan and the Golden Lion (1923)
- Tarzan and the Ant Men (1924)
- Tarzan's Quest (1936)
- Tarzan the Magnificent (1939)

Jane also appeared in a minor role in the non-Tarzan novel The Eternal Lover (1925), the events of which take place chronologically between The Return of Tarzan and The Beasts of Tarzan.

Jane is described in Tarzan of the Apes as a beautiful, young woman, with long, blonde hair. She is between 18 and 20 years old in the novel.

In addition, Porter is the narrator-protagonist in Jane: The Woman Who Loved Tarzan by Robin Maxwell, a 2011 novel authorized by Edgar Rice Burroughs, Inc. to commemorate the centennial celebration of Tarzan. Maxwell's novel is a free adaptation of the original story, contradicting it on numerous points of the story.

== In other media ==
=== Film ===
Early Tarzan films portrayed Jane Porter and (occasionally) her father faithfully to the portrayal in the novels. The 1932 sound film Tarzan the Ape Man and its sequels changed the character's name to Jane Parker, portraying her as English rather than American and making her and Tarzan the adoptive parents of an orphan they named "Boy". In addition, the name of Jane's father in the first film is James Parker. Remakes of the 1932 film, (Tarzan, the Ape Man (1959) and Tarzan, the Ape Man (1981) reprised this portrayal as well as that of her father. Maureen O'Sullivan, who portrayed Jane Parker with Johnny Weissmuller in the 1932 film and its first few sequels, was the most famous screen Jane.

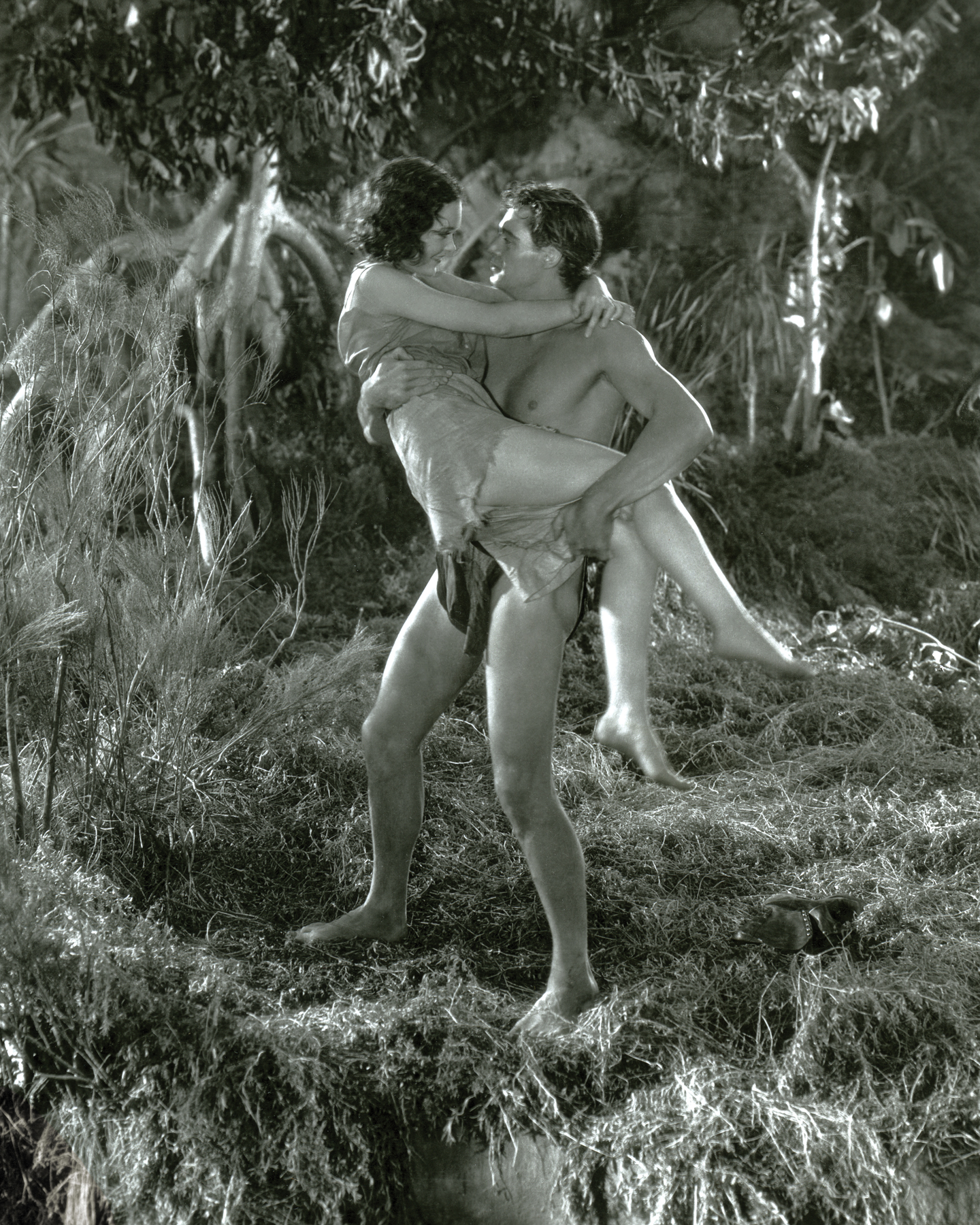
O'Sullivan and Weissmuller in Tarzan the Ape Man (1932)

In recent Tarzan films, starting with Greystoke: The Legend of Tarzan, Lord of the Apes (1984), the character is again Jane Porter, and her father Archimedes Q. Porter, and both once again Americans (with the exception of Disney's 1999 animated Tarzan, which again represents both as English).

Actresses who portrayed Jane on film include:

- Enid Markey 1918 (Elmo Lincoln as Tarzan)
- Karla Schramm 1920 (Gene Pollar as Tarzan; P. Dempsey Tabler as Tarzan)
- Louise Lorraine 1921 (Elmo Lincoln as Tarzan)
- Dorothy Dunbar 1927 (James H. Pierce as Tarzan)
- Natalie Kingston 1929 (Frank Merrill as Tarzan)
- Maureen O'Sullivan 1932–1942 (Johnny Weissmuller as Tarzan)
- Brenda Joyce 1945–1949 (Johnny Weissmuller as Tarzan; Lex Barker as Tarzan)
- Vanessa Brown 1950 (Lex Barker as Tarzan)
- Virginia Huston 1951 (Lex Barker as Tarzan)
- Dorothy Hart 1952 (Lex Barker as Tarzan)
- Joyce MacKenzie 1953 (Lex Barker as Tarzan)
- Eve Brent 1958 (Gordon Scott as Tarzan)
- Joanna Barnes 1959 (Denny Miller as Tarzan)
- Bo Derek 1981 (Miles O'Keeffe as Tarzan)
- Andie MacDowell 1984 (Christopher Lambert as Tarzan)
- Jane March 1998 (Casper Van Dien as Tarzan)
- Minnie Driver 1999 (voice – Disney's animated Tarzan) (Tony Goldwyn as the voice of Tarzan)
- Olivia d'Abo 2002, 2001–2003 (voice – Disney's direct-to-video sequel, and the TV series) (Michael T. Weiss as the voice of Tarzan)
- Spencer Locke 2013 (voice – Constantin Film's CGI Tarzan) (Kellan Lutz as Tarzan)
- Margot Robbie 2016 (Alexander Skarsgård as Tarzan)

The Jane character is absent in:

- Tarzan Triumphs (1943)
- Tarzan's Desert Mystery (1943)
- Tarzan's Hidden Jungle (1955)
- Tarzan and the Lost Safari (1957)
- Tarzan's Greatest Adventure (1959)
- Tarzan the Magnificent (1960)
- Tarzan Goes to India (1962)
- Tarzan's Three Challenges (1963)
- Tarzan and the Valley of Gold (1966)
- Tarzan and the Great River (1967)
- Tarzan and the Jungle Boy (1968)

==== Jane in all but name ====
Three Tarzan films presented female leads who became the partner of Tarzan, but who were not named Jane, for one reason or another.

- Tarzan the Mighty (1928), starring Frank Merrill. Natalie Kingston portrays Mary Trevor, who becomes Tarzan's mate at film's end. A year later Kingston portrayed Jane to Merrill's Tarzan in Tarzan the Tiger.
- Tarzan the Fearless (1933), starring Buster Crabbe. Jacqueline Wells portrays Mary Brooks, who becomes Tarzan's mate at film's end.
- Tarzan's Revenge (1938), starring Glenn Morris. Eleanor Holm portrays Eleanor Reed, who becomes Tarzan's mate at film's end. Producer Sol Lesser nixed calling the character Jane as he felt that Holm was so popular for her swimming exploits that audiences would not accept her playing a character not named Eleanor.

=== Television ===
The Jane character has appeared sporadically in the seven (to date) television series featuring Tarzan, occasionally in offbeat portrayals when she does appear.

She was entirely omitted in television series Tarzan (1966–68).

In the Filmation animated series Tarzan, Lord of the Jungle (1976–80), she appeared once in the episode "Tarzan and Jane," in which she and her father were part of an archaeological expedition looking for the lost city of Cowloon; she was voiced by Linda Gary in this episode.

In the TV movie Tarzan in Manhattan (1989) the character was reimagined as a New York cab driver, played by Kim Crosby, and in the French-Canadian-Mexican series Tarzán (1991–94) as a French ecologist, played by Lydie Denier.

Jane was absent from Tarzan: The Epic Adventures (1996–1997), and Lydie Denier returned in the role of Olga de Coude; Jane was slated to appear in the unproduced second season, with Julie St. Claire cast in the role.

Olivia d'Abo took the role in the Disney animated series The Legend of Tarzan (2001–2003), a follow-up to Disney's animated Tarzan film and its direct-to-video sequel Tarzan & Jane (2002).

The 2003 series Tarzan, set like Tarzan in Manhattan in New York City, casts Sarah Wayne Callies as detective Jane Porter.

In the CGI 2017 series Tarzan and Jane, Jane Porter is a teenage, big-city girl who becomes friends with a teenage Tarzan.

Actresses who portrayed Jane on television include:

- Linda Gary 1979 (voice, with Robert Ridgely as the voice of Tarzan)
- Kim Crosby 1989 (Joe Lara as Tarzan)
- Lydie Denier 1991–1994 (Wolf Larson as Tarzan)
- Olivia d'Abo 2000–2003 (voice, with Michael T. Weiss as the voice of Tarzan)
- Sarah Wayne Callies 2003 (Travis Fimmel as Tarzan)
- Rebecca Shoichet 2017 (voice) (Giles Panton as Tarzan)

=== Radio ===
- Joan Burroughs Pierce 1932–1934

=== Stage ===
- Ethel Dwyer 1921 (Broadway)
- Jennifer Gambatese 2006 (Disney's Broadway Musical)

=== Audio cassette ===
- 1999 Minnie Driver (with Naia Kelly playing "narrator" Jane)

=== Video games ===
- Naia Kelly 2001–2002 (voice – Tarzan Untamed and Kingdom Hearts) (Tony Goldwyn as the voice of Tarzan)

== Sources ==
- Essoe, Gabe (1968). Tarzan of the movies : 50+ years of E R Burroughs' legendary hero. New York: Citadel Press. ISBN 0-8065-0343-2. OCLC 650488072.
