= Léon Rom =

Belgian military officer and colonial administrator (1859–1924)

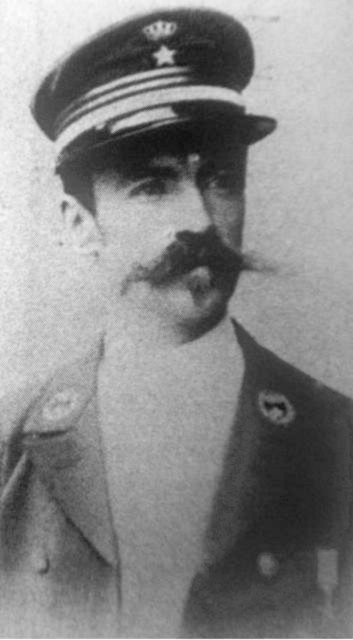
- Portrait photograph of Rom
- Born: 2 April 1859; Mons, Belgium
- Died: 30 January 1924 (aged 64); Ixelles, Belgium
- Occupations: Soldier, colonial official

Léon Auguste Théophile Rom (2 April 1859 – 30 January 1924) was a Belgian military officer and colonial administrator. His role in atrocities in the Congo Free State has led some to speculate that Rom served as an inspiration for the character of Kurtz in Joseph Conrad's 1899 novella Heart of Darkness.

== Life ==
Léon Auguste Théophile Rom was born on 2 April 1859 to a poor family in Mons, Belgium, and joined the Belgian Army at the age of 16. He subsequently worked as a customs officer before leaving Belgium for the Congo Free State in 1886 as one of the few hundred whites working in the colony's administration.

Receiving a series of rapid promotions, Rom commanded the station at Stanley Falls and was eventually promoted District Commissioner of Matadi. He later transferred to the colonial military, the Force Publique, where he served as a captain. He was praised for his conduct during the Congo Arab War (1892–94) in which he personally negotiated the surrender of an Arab stronghold. After retiring from the Force Publique, he worked as an official for the Compagnie du Kasai in central Congo.

Rom became most infamous for his role in atrocities in the Congo Free State in the Stanley Falls area. According to contemporary reports from the travel-writer and journalist Edward James Glave written on February 21, 1895, Rom had used the severed heads of 21 Congolese, who resisted having their family members stolen, to decorate the flower beds of his house at Stanley Falls. He is also said to have kept a gallows permanently in place at his station.

Still working for the Compagnie du Kasai, Rom died in Brussels in 1924.

== In popular culture ==
It has been argued that Rom served as the inspiration for the character of Mr. Kurtz, an ivory trader who features prominently in Joseph Conrad's 1899 novella Heart of Darkness. Among those who have made this argument are Adam Hochschild who argued in King Leopold's Ghost that Rom and Conrad may have met in 1890. Other scholars have rejected this.

Rom notably features as the main antagonist in the 2016 film The Legend of Tarzan, in which he is portrayed by the Austrian actor Christoph Waltz.

== See also ==
- Atrocities in the Congo Free State

== Bibliography ==
- Firchow, Peter Edgerly (2000). Envisioning Africa: Racism and Imperialism in Conrad's Heart of Darkness. Lexington: University Press of Kentucky. ISBN 9780813191980.
- Hochschild, Adam (2012). King Leopold's Ghost (Paperback ed.). London: Pan. ISBN 978-1-4472-1135-8.
