= Mangani =

Fictional species of great apes in Tarzan

Mangani is a fictional species of great apes in the Tarzan novels of Edgar Rice Burroughs. The name is shared by the invented language used by these apes. In the invented language, Mangani (meaning "great-ape") is the apes' word for their own kind, although the term is also applied (with modifications) to humans. The Mangani are represented as the apes who foster and raise Tarzan.

== As a species of ape ==
The Mangani are described by Burroughs as approximately man-sized, and appear to be a species intermediate between gorillas and chimpanzees. He also described them as “man-like apes which the natives of the Gobi speak of in whispers; but which no white man ever had seen [before Tarzan]” (Jungle Tales of Tarzan: "The Battle for Teeka") implying a connection to the Almas or Yeti. In the original Tarzan books gorillas, called Bolgani by the Mangani, are explicitly stated to be a separate species from Mangani.

As described by Burroughs, Mangani are organized in tribal bands ruled by dominant males, or "kings", which subsist by foraging for fruit, grubs, insects, and sometimes meat, in localized territories. Tribes are generally identified by the names of their kings. Burroughs portrays the Mangani (and indeed most jungle animals) as susceptible to occasional bouts of madness in which they will lash out violently and unpredictably at other living creatures in their vicinity. Tarzan is raised in the tribe of Kerchak, based in the coastal jungle of equatorial Africa, as shown in Tarzan of the Apes and Jungle Tales of Tarzan. As an adult he comes to lead this tribe; later, he becomes accepted in other tribes of Mangani, such as the tribe of Molak in The Beasts of Tarzan. Tarzan continued to associate occasionally with his original tribe until cast out in Tarzan and the Golden Lion, as the result of a Tarzan impersonator having murdered one of its members.

Altogether, Mangani appear in 15 of the Tarzan books; the first through seventh (Tarzan of the Apes, The Return of Tarzan, The Beasts of Tarzan, The Son of Tarzan, Tarzan and the Jewels of Opar, Jungle Tales of Tarzan, Tarzan the Untamed), the ninth (Tarzan and the Golden Lion), the 11th and 12th (Tarzan, Lord of the Jungle, Tarzan and the Lost Empire), the 14th (Tarzan the Invincible), the 18th (Tarzan and the Leopard Men), the 20th (Tarzan and the Forbidden City), the 23rd (Tarzan and the Madman published posthumously), and the 26th (Tarzan: The Lost Adventure, published posthumously and expanded from an incomplete Burroughs manuscript).

There have been several attempts to identify the fictional Mangani with an actual primate species. Science fiction author Philip José Farmer speculated they might be a variety of australopithecines such as Australopithecus in his pseudo-biography of Tarzan, Tarzan Alive (1972). Farmer's premise is that the Tarzan novels were the biography of a real person, with some details changed or exaggerated by Burroughs. The great apes have no sophisticated spoken language as Burroughs described, therefore Farmer reasoned the Mangani must be Australopithecus or another species which might plausibly have a sophisticated spoken language.

Walt Disney Pictures' 1999 animated feature film Tarzan, its sequel Tarzan & Jane and prequel Tarzan II, and the television series The Legend of Tarzan based on it, portray the apes who raised Tarzan as gorillas.

=== Known Mangani tribes ===
A list of tribal groups of Mangani and individual named Mangani associated with them as portrayed in the Tarzan novels follows, together with the titles of the books in which they appear or are referenced. Individuals associated with more than one tribe may be listed more than once.

Tribe of Go-lat

- Go-lat ("Black-eye") (m.), king – Tarzan the Untamed
- Zu-tag ("Big-neck") (m.) – Tarzan the Untamed

Tribe of Kerchak (later of Tarzan, Terkoz, Karnath, Pagth)

- Chulk ("?") (m.) – Tarzan and the Jewels of Opar
- Gazan ("Red-skin") (m.) – Jungle Tales of Tarzan
- Gobu ("Black-male") (m.) – Tarzan and the Golden Lion
- Go-yad ("Black-ear") (m.), later of the tribe of Toyat – Tarzan, Lord of the Jungle; Tarzan and the Lost Empire
- Gozan ("Black-skin") (m.) – Jungle Tales of Tarzan
- Gunto ("?-purple") (m.) – Tarzan of the Apes; Jungle Tales of Tarzan
- Kala ("Milk-light") (f.) – Tarzan of the Apes; Jungle Tales of Tarzan
- Kama ("Milk-child") (f.) – Jungle Tales of Tarzan
- Karnath ("?") (m.), king after Tarzan – The Return of Tarzan
- Kerchak ("?") (m.), king – Tarzan of the Apes; Jungle Tales of Tarzan
- Mamka ("?-milk") (f.) – Jungle Tales of Tarzan
- Mumga ("?-red") (f.) – Jungle Tales of Tarzan
- Mungo ("?-black") (m.) – Tarzan of the Apes
- Neeta ("Duck-little") (f.) – Tarzan of the Apes; Tarzan and the Golden Lion
- Numgo ("?-black") (m.) – Jungle Tales of Tarzan
- Pagth ("?") (m.), king after Karnath – Tarzan and the Golden Lion
- Taglat ("Neck-nose") (m.) – Tarzan and the Jewels of Opar
- Tana ("Warrior-light") (f.) – Tarzan of the Apes
- Taug ("Tall-bottom") (m.) – Jungle Tales of Tarzan
- Teeka ("?") (f.) – Jungle Tales of Tarzan
- Terkoz ("?") (m.), king between Tarzan's stints as king – Tarzan of the Apes
- Thaka ("?") (m.) – Tarzan of the Apes, Jungle Tales of Tarzan
- Tublat ("Broken-nose") (m.) – Tarzan of the Apes; Jungle Tales of Tarzan

Tribe of Mal-gash (also called the tribe of Ho-den and the Servants of God)

- Fernando (m.), mangani name unknown – Tarzan and the Madman
- Mal-gash ("Yellow-Tooth") (m.), king – Tarzan and the Madman
- Sancho (m.), mangani name unknown – Tarzan and the Madman

Tribe of Molak

- Akut ("Light-hole") (m.), later solitary – The Beasts of Tarzan; The Son of Tarzan
- Molak ("Short-?") (m.), king – The Beasts of Tarzan

Tribe of Toyat

- Gayat or Ga-yat ("Red-eye") (m.) – Tarzan, Lord of the Jungle; Tarzan and the Lost Empire; Tarzan the Invincible; Tarzan and the Leopard Men
- Go-yad ("Black-ear") (m.), formerly of the tribe of Kerchak – Tarzan, Lord of the Jungle; Tarzan and the Lost Empire
- M'walot ("Blue-face") (m.) – Tarzan, Lord of the Jungle
- Toyat or To-yat ("Purple-eye") (m.), king – Tarzan, Lord of the Jungle; Tarzan the Invincible
- Zutho or Zu-tho ("Big-mouth") (m.), later king of the tribe of Zutho, later of the tribe of Ungo – Tarzan, Lord of the Jungle; Tarzan and the Lost Empire; Tarzan the Invincible; Tarzan and the Leopard Men; Tarzan and the Forbidden City; Tarzan and the Madman

Tribe of Ungo (possibly the same as the later tribe of Zutho)

- Ga-un ("Red-?") (m.) – Tarzan and the Forbidden City; Tarzan and the Madman
- Ungo ("Jackal") (m.), king – Tarzan and the Forbidden City; Tarzan and the Madman
- Zutho or Zu-tho ("Big-mouth") (m.), formerly of the tribe of Toyat, formerly king of the tribe of Zutho – Tarzan, Lord of the Jungle; Tarzan and the Lost Empire; Tarzan the Invincible; Tarzan and the Leopard Men; Tarzan and the Forbidden City; Tarzan and the Madman

Tribe of Zutho (split from the earlier tribe of Toyat, possibly the same as the later tribe of Ungo)

- Zutho or Zu-tho ("Big-mouth") (m.), king, formerly of tribe of Toyat, later of the tribe of Ungo – Tarzan, Lord of the Jungle; Tarzan and the Lost Empire; Tarzan and the Leopard Men; Tarzan the Invincible; Tarzan and the Forbidden City; Tarzan and the Madman

Tribe of Zu-yad

- Go-lot ("Black-face") (m.) – Tarzan: the Lost Adventure
- Zu-yad ("Big-ear") (m.), king – Tarzan: the Lost Adventure

Rogue (tribeless) Mangani

- Toog ("?") (m.) – Jungle Tales of Tarzan

== As a language ==
The Mangani language is represented in the books as a primal universal language shared by many primate species in addition to the Mangani themselves, including monkeys (Jungle Tales of Tarzan and others), gorillas, Sumatran orangutans (Tarzan and the Foreign Legion), and the more man-like Sagoths of Pellucidar (Tarzan at the Earth's Core). In the later Tarzan novels, Tarzan converses in Mangani with his monkey companion Nkima more often than with the Mangani themselves. In the crossover novel King Kong vs. Tarzan, the giant, prehistoric ape King Kong possibly also understands the language; although it is left ambiguous whether he actually understood it or was copying what Tarzan said in Mangani.

Other jungle animals are described as having their own bestial languages, but also as being able to understand Mangani to varying degrees. Whether the Mangani in turn understand any other animal languages is uncertain; Tarzan, at least, comprehends to some extent at least a few. In Tarzan of the Apes, before learning any spoken human languages, he avers "I speak only the language of my tribe—the great apes who were Kerchak's; and a little of the languages of Tantor, the elephant, and Numa, the lion, and of the other folks of the jungle I understand."

The Mangani language as described by Burroughs is made up largely of grunts and growls representing nouns and various basic concepts. The bestial quality of the speech, however, does not come through in the rather large lexicon of Mangani words Burroughs actually provides. The depicted language can be thought of as bearing a relationship to the described language similar to that between the movies' euphonious "Tarzan yell" and the books' terrifying "victory cry of the bull ape" from which it supposedly derives; the example in each instance falls short of embodying the description.

The word "mangani" is a compound, with man meaning "great" or "large" and gani meaning "ape" (or perhaps "people"). With modifications, the term is also applied to humans, gomangani ("dark-great-ape") for black-skinned humans and tarmangani ("light-great-ape") for white-skinned humans, suggesting that the Mangani regard human beings as variations on their own type. Notably, gorillas do not seem to be regarded as "man" gani, but as a different type of "ape," bolgani ("flat" or "earth-bound ape").

Some examples (with translation) of Burroughs' Mangani words follow.

- Tarzan = White-skin
- Mangani = Great Apes (also refers to humans)
  - tarmangani = "Great White Apes," i.e., white-skinned people, such as Tarzan himself
  - gomangani = "Great Black Apes," i.e., dark-skinned people,
- bolgani = "Flat [earth-bound] Apes," i.e., gorillas.
- nala = up
- tand-nala = down
- Kreegah bundolo = "Beware (I) kill!" For example, Tarzan might cry out to warn of danger, "Kreegah bundolo! White men come with hunt sticks.
- Kagoda = "Surrender" (depending upon the inflection used, the word can be a demand for surrender or a concession of surrender)
- Numa = Lion
- Kanugani = False Apes (referring to the anthropomorphic apes Zira and Cornelius in the crossover Tarzan on the Planet of the Apes)
- Tantor = elephant

== Mangani in other media ==
Attempts to portray the Mangani outside the medium of their origin have varied.

The Tarzan comic strip and comic books generally have no difficulty in visualizing them according to Burroughs' vision, though the Tarzan comic books published by Malibu Comics in the early 1990s suggested the Mangani were a variety of Bigfoot or Sasquatch.

In the live-action Tarzan films they have generally been represented by a token individual, Cheeta, a chimpanzee. The chief exception is the 1984 Greystoke: The Legend of Tarzan, Lord of the Apes, which adheres closely to Burroughs' description; in this film, adult Mangani are portrayed by human actors in ape costumes, while the roles of immature Mangani are taken by chimpanzees. However, the Mangani language is not used in the film, with subtitles or otherwise, and as a result the name "Tarzan" is used nowhere in the film, except in the title.

Walt Disney Pictures' 1999 animated feature film Tarzan, its sequels Tarzan & Jane and Tarzan II, and the television series The Legend of Tarzan based on it, portray the apes who raised Tarzan as gorillas. The only use of the term Mangani in the television series is as the proper name of an individual ghostly white ape who possesses mystical powers.

The 2016 live-action film The Legend of Tarzan featured the Mangani as a distinct species of gorilla-like ape, describing them as being more aggressive and dangerous than gorillas. The Mangani themselves were computer-generated images using motion capture technology.

Poems in Mangani have been written by members of the Oulipo group, like Jacques Jouet, Jacques Roubaud, or Hervé Le Tellier.

== Other uses ==
- In an episode of The Fabulous Furry Freak Brothers, Fat Freddy roars "Kreegah!" before robbing a grocery store.
- Dogbert reacts to Dilbert's descent into savagery after he has been home telecommuting too long with "Kreegah! Bundolo!" in a February 1995 Dilbert strip.
- "Kreegah Bundola" is one of a few names for the Frank Zappa song whose most popular title seems to be "Let's Move to Cleveland". It is also utilized in Bruce Coville's "Allbright" series as Grakker's "violence" module boot-up sound bite (from Aliens Ate My Homework). It was uttered by a hunger-crazed Fat Freddy in an episode of The Fabulous Furry Freak Brothers.
- In Portuguese, "Kreegah bundolo" was translated as "Krig-Ha, Bandolo!", and used as the name of an album by the Brazilian rocker Raul Seixas.
- In the Mexican comic El Santos vs. la Tetona Mendoza by cartoonists Jis and Trino, el Santos uses the "Mexican-ized" expression "Kriga Bundolo" when furious or flexing muscles.

== See also ==
- Great ape language
