= Tarzan (book series) =

Books of the Tarzan series of Edgar Rice Burroughs

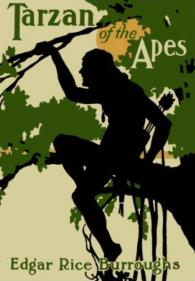
- Cover of Tarzan of the Apes
- List of books: Tarzan of the Apes The Return of Tarzan The Beasts of Tarzan The Son of Tarzan Tarzan and the Jewels of Opar Jungle Tales of Tarzan Tarzan the Untamed Tarzan the Terrible Tarzan and the Golden Lion Tarzan and the Ant Men Tarzan, Lord of the Jungle Tarzan and the Lost Empire Tarzan at the Earth's Core Tarzan the Invincible Tarzan Triumphant Tarzan and the City of Gold Tarzan and the Lion Man Tarzan and the Leopard Men Tarzan's Quest Tarzan and the Forbidden City Tarzan the Magnificent Tarzan and the Foreign Legion Tarzan and the Madman Tarzan and the Castaways Tarzan and the Tarzan Twins Tarzan and the Valley of Gold Tarzan: The Lost Adventure Tarzan: The Epic Adventures The Dark Heart of Time
- Author: Edgar Rice Burroughs
- Country: United States
- Language: English
- Genre: Adventure
- Publisher: A. C. McClurg
- Published: 1912 – 1966
- Media type: Print (hardback)

Tarzan is a series of 24 adventure novels written by Edgar Rice Burroughs (1875–1950) and published between 1912 and 1966, followed by several novels either co-written by Burroughs, or officially authorized by his estate. There are also two works written by Burroughs especially for children that are not related to the main series.

The series is considered a classic of literature and is the author's best-known work. The titular Tarzan has been called one of the best-known literary characters in the world. Tarzan has been adapted many times, complete or in part, for radio, television, stage, and cinema—it has been adapted for film more times than any book.

As of 2026, the first thirteen books, through Tarzan at the Earth's Core, are in the public domain worldwide. The later works are still under copyright in the United States.

== Main books ==
=== Tarzan of the Apes (1912) ===
John and Alice (Rutherford) Clayton, Lord and Lady Greystoke of England, are marooned in the western coastal jungles of equatorial Africa in 1888. After an unstated amount of time later, their son John Clayton II is born. At the age of one, his mother dies and soon thereafter his father is killed by the savage king ape, Kerchak. The infant Clayton, subsequently adopted by the she-ape Kala, is named Tarzan ('White Skin' in the ape language) and is raised in ignorance of his human heritage.

As a boy, feeling alienated from his peers due to their physical differences, Tarzan discovers his true parents' cabin, where he first learns of others like himself in their books. Using basic primers with pictures, over many years he teaches himself to read English, but having never heard it, cannot speak it.

Upon his return from one visit to the cabin, he is attacked by a huge gorilla whom he manages to kill with his father's knife, although he is terribly wounded in the struggle. As he grows up, Tarzan becomes a skilled hunter, exciting the jealousy of Kerchak, the ape leader, who finally attacks him. Tarzan kills Kerchak and takes his place as "king" of the apes.

Later, a tribe of Africans settle in the area, and Tarzan's adopted mother, Kala, is killed by one of their hunters. Avenging himself on the killer, Tarzan begins an antagonistic relationship with the tribe, raiding its village for weapons and practicing cruel pranks on them. They, in turn, regard him as an evil spirit and attempt to placate him.

A few years later, when Tarzan is 21 years of age, a new party is marooned on the coast, including 19 year old Jane Porter, the first white woman Tarzan has ever seen. Tarzan's cousin, William Cecil Clayton, unwitting usurper of the ape man's ancestral English estate, is also among the party. Tarzan spies on the newcomers, aids them in secret, and saves Jane from the perils of the jungle.

Among the party was French naval officer Paul d'Arnot. While rescuing d'Arnot from the natives, a rescue ship recovers the castaways. D'Arnot teaches Tarzan to speak French and offers to take Tarzan to the land of white men where he might connect with Jane again. On their journey, d'Arnot teaches him how to behave among white men. In the ensuing months, Tarzan eventually learns to speak English as well.

Ultimately, Tarzan travels to find Jane in Wisconsin, USA. Tarzan learns the bitter news that she has become engaged to William Clayton. Meanwhile, clues from his parents' cabin have enabled D'Arnot to prove Tarzan's true identity as John Clayton, Viscount Greystoke. Instead of reclaiming his inheritance from William, Tarzan chooses rather to conceal and renounce his heritage for the sake of Jane's happiness.

=== The Return of Tarzan (1913) ===
The Return of Tarzan picks up soon after the point at which Tarzan of the Apes concludes. The ape man, feeling rootless in the wake of his noble sacrifice of his prospects of wedding Jane Porter, leaves America for Europe to visit his friend Paul d'Arnot. On the ship he becomes embroiled in the affairs of Countess Olga de Coude, her husband, Count Raoul de Coude, and two shady characters attempting to prey on them, Nikolas Rokoff and his henchman Alexis Paulvitch. Rokoff, it turns out, is also the countess's brother. Tarzan thwarts the villains' scheme, making them his deadly enemies.

Later, in France, Rokoff tries time and again to eliminate the ape man, finally engineering a duel between him and the count by making it appear that he is the countess's lover. Tarzan deliberately refuses to defend himself in the duel, even offering the count his own weapon after the latter fails to kill him with his own, a grand gesture that convinces his antagonist of his innocence. In return, Count Raoul finds him a job as a special agent in the French Ministry of War. Tarzan is assigned to service in French Algeria.

A sequence of adventures among the local Arabs ensues, including another brush with Rokoff. Afterward Tarzan sails for Cape Town, Union of South Africa and strikes up a shipboard acquaintance with Hazel Strong, a friend of Jane's. However, Rokoff and Paulovitch are also aboard, and manage to ambush him and throw him overboard.

Miraculously, Tarzan manages to reach shore in a lifeboat he finds from a derelict ship. He finds himself in the coastal jungle where he was brought up by the apes. He soon rescues and befriends a local warrior, Busuli of the Waziri, and is adopted into the Waziri tribe. After defeating a raid on their village by ivory raiders, Tarzan becomes their chief.

The Waziri know of a lost city deep in the jungle, from which they have obtained their golden ornaments. Tarzan has them take him there, but is captured by its inhabitants, a race of ape-like men, and is condemned to be sacrificed to their sun god. To Tarzan's surprise, the priestess to perform the sacrifice is a beautiful woman who speaks the ape language he learned as a child. She tells him she is La, high priestess of the lost city of Opar. When the sacrificial ceremony is fortuitously interrupted, she hides Tarzan and promises to lead him to freedom. But the ape man escapes on his own, locates a treasure chamber, and manages to rejoin the Waziri.

Meanwhile, Hazel Strong has reached Cape Town where she meets Jane and her father, Professor Porter, together with Jane's fiancé, Tarzan's cousin William Cecil Clayton. They are all invited on a cruise up the west coast of Africa aboard the Lady Alice, the yacht of another friend, Lord Tennington. Rokoff, now using the alias of M. Thuran, ingratiates himself with the party and is also invited along. The Lady Alice crashes into the same derelict ship Tarzan found, and it sinks, forcing the passengers and crew into the lifeboats. The one containing Jane, Clayton and "Thuran" is separated from the others and suffers terrible privations. Coincidentally, the boat finally makes shore in the same general area that Tarzan did. Unknown to the three, it is but a few miles from the landing site of the other life boats.

The three construct a crude shelter and eke out an existence of near starvation. After some weeks, Jane and William Clayton are surprised in the forest by a lion. Clayton loses Jane's respect by cowering in fear before the beast instead of defending her. But, they are saved from attack when the lion is suddenly speared and killed by an unknown hand. Their hidden savior is in fact Tarzan, who leaves without revealing himself due to seeing Jane in the arms of Clayton. Jane breaks off her engagement to Clayton, finally gathering the courage to follow her heart and not marry a man she does not love.

Later Jane is kidnapped and taken to Opar by a party of the Oparian ape-men who were pursuing their escaped sacrifice, Tarzan. The ape man learns of her capture and tracks them, managing to save her from being sacrificed by La, who is crushed by Tarzan's spurning of her for Jane.

Tarzan and Jane make their way up the coast to the former's boyhood cabin, where they encounter the remainder of the castaways of the Lady Alice, except for Clayton. D'Arnot is there with his naval ship and is preparing to rescue and return the party to civilization. "Thuran" is exposed as Rokoff and arrested. The missing Clayton had been very ill and was abandoned by Rokoff at the location where he, Rokoff and Jane's boat had landed. Jane and Tarzan go to find him, but he dies in spite of Tarzan and Jane's efforts to help him.

Tarzan weds Jane and Tennington weds Hazel in a double ceremony performed by Professor Porter, who had been ordained a minister in his youth. Then they all set sail for civilization, taking along the treasure Tarzan had found in Opar.

=== The Beasts of Tarzan (1914) ===
The story begins a year after the conclusion the previous book, Tarzan (Lord Greystoke) and Jane have had a son they named Jack. Tarzan has spent much time building an estate home on the Waziri lands in Uziri, Africa, but has returned to his ancestral estate in London for the rainy season.

Tarzan's adversaries from the previous novel, Nikolas Rokoff and Alexis Paulvitch, escape prison and kidnap the Greystoke heir. But the trap is elaborate and insidious, leading both Tarzan and Jane to be kidnapped as well. Rokoff exiles Tarzan on a jungle island, informing him that Jack will be left with a cannibal tribe to be raised as one of their own, while Jane's fate was to be left to his imagination.

Using his jungle skill and primal intelligence, Tarzan wins the help of Sheeta, the vicious panther, a tribe of great apes led by the moderately intelligent Akut, and a native warrior, Mugambi. With their aid, Tarzan reaches the mainland and begins a lengthy pursuit to find Jane (who is actively engineering her own extrication) and Jack.

By the end of the story Rokoff is dead, while Paulvitch, his cohort, is presumed dead but manages to escape into the jungle. The Tarzan family returned to London along with Mugambi, who is offered a place at Tarzan's Waziri estate.

=== The Son of Tarzan (1915–1916) ===
The story begins 10 years after the conclusion of the previous novel. During the past decade, Alexis Paulvitch, who had escaped Tarzan at the end of the last novel, has lived a hideous life of abuse and disease among tribal people in Africa. Now he is discovered by a European ship and taken aboard. In the months that followed, Paulvitch encounters the ape, Akut, (whom Tarzan had befriended in that previous story) at one of the ship's stops. Because of Akut's interactions with Tarzan, he was unafraid of white men, and Paulvitch, unaware of the previous relationship, saw an opportunity to make some money. He took Akut to London and began displaying him publicly.

After the trauma of the kidnappings ten years earlier, Jane had refused to return to Africa or to allow their son Jack to know anything about his father's past for fear that he might somehow try to relive it. Perhaps she instinctively knew that Jack was somehow very connected to Tarzan's old life, for Jack did have an avid interest in wildlife and he was extremely athletic. When the Claytons heard about the displayed ape, John (Tarzan) decided to take Jack to see him. He was surprised to find the ape was his old friend, Akut, and began conversing with him. Jack was amazed to see that his father could do so. John then told Jack of his life as Tarzan.

Jack started sneaking away to see Akut and began learning the language of the apes. Jack began to form a plan to take Akut back to the jungle. Paulvitch saw an opportunity for revenge, and agreed to help Jack. They escape to an African port where Paulvitch attacks Jack. Jack (probably now 12), like his father, was man-sized as a teen. Paulvitch is killed, and Jack, terrified, escapes into the jungle with Akut, thinking he will have to run for the rest of his life.

Like Tarzan before him, Jack learns survival in the jungle and encounters the Mangani apes, who he can speak with because of his dialogue with Akut. The nearest they can manage of his name "Jack" in the ape tongue is "Korak". This means "killer" which seems appropriate since Jack has proven himself to be such.

By around the age of thirteen, Jack finds a girl of about age eleven named Meriem, the daughter of a French general. She was kidnapped by Arabs as a child, and Jack rescues her. He begins teaching her to survive the jungle and they begin a sibling type relationship and live adventurously in the jungle for several years.

In the interim, Tarzan and Jane have begun living at their Wahiri estate in Africa again, not having any idea what became of their son. After about six years Tarzan and Jane encounter Korak (now about 18) and Meriem (now 16) and reunite with them and are returned to London and married. Arguably, the book is as much about Meriem as it is about Tarzan's son.

=== Tarzan and the Jewels of Opar (1916) ===
At the end of the previous novel (#4) Tarzan (John Clayton) and Jane's son, Jack a.k.a. Korak, has come into adulthood. John (Tarzan) and Jane Clayton have left London and returned to their Waziri ranch, some distance from Tarzan's original stomping grounds in Africa (where Jack will find them in novel #4).

John Clayton finds that his fortunes have been embezzled, so he decides to return to the lost city of Opar, where he procured a large supply of gold from their forgotten vaults and reinforced his family fortune (in novel #2).

During this return trip Tarzan is injured in an earthquake and loses all memories of his adult, civilized life and about Jane. La, the high priestess of the Flaming god of Opar, takes advantage of his amnesia. She had fallen in lust with the ape man during their first encounter. But while La hopes his amnesia opens the door for her lustful advances, her priests are not going to allow Tarzan to escape their sacrificial knives this time. In the meanwhile, Jane is in trouble and wonders what is keeping her husband from coming to her rescue.

=== Jungle Tales of Tarzan (1916–1917) ===
A collection of twelve loosely connected short stories of Tarzan's late teenage years, within a year or two before Tarzan first encounters white people including Jane Porter.

1. "Tarzan's First Love"
2. "The Capture of Tarzan"
3. "The Fight for the Balu"
4. "The God of Tarzan"
5. "Tarzan and the Black Boy"
6. "The Witch-Doctor Seeks Vengeance"
7. "The End of Bukawai"
8. "The Lion"
9. "The Nightmare"
10. "The Battle for Teeka"
11. "A Jungle Joke"
12. "Tarzan Rescues the Moon"

=== Tarzan the Untamed (1919–1920) ===
In the year 1914, while John Clayton, Lord Greystoke (Tarzan) is away from his plantation home in British East Africa, it is destroyed by invading German troops from Tanganyika. On his return he discovers among many burned bodies one that appears to be the corpse of his wife, Jane. Another fatality is the Waziri warrior Wasimbu, left crucified by the Germans. (Wasimbu's father Muviro, first mentioned in this story, goes on to play a prominent role in later Tarzan novels.)

Maddened, the ape-man seeks revenge not only on the perpetrators of the tragedy but upon all Germans, and sets out for the battle front of the war in West Africa. On the way he has a run-in with a lion (or Numa, as it is called by the apes among whom Tarzan was raised), which he traps in a gulch by blocking the entrance. Upon reaching the front he infiltrates the German headquarters and seizes Major Schneider, the officer he believes led the raid on his estate. Returning to the gulch, he throws Schneider to the lion. Tarzan goes on to help the British forces in various ways, including setting the lion loose in the enemy trenches. Tarzan later kills von Goss, another German officer involved in the attack on the Greystoke estate.

He then becomes embroiled in the affairs of Bertha Kircher, a woman he has seen in both the German and British camps, and believes to be a German spy, particularly after he learns she possesses his mother's locket, which he had given as a gift to Jane. His efforts to retrieve it lead him to a rendezvous between Kircher and Captain Fritz Schneider, brother of the Major Schneider Tarzan previously threw to the lion, and the actual commander of the force that burned his estate. Killing Schneider, Tarzan believes his vengeance complete. Abandoning his vendetta against the Germans he departs for the jungle, swearing off all company with mankind.

Seeking a band of Mangani, the species of apes among whom he had been raised, Tarzan crosses a desert, undergoing great privations. Indeed, the desert is almost his undoing. He only survives by feigning death to lure a vulture (Ska in the ape language) into his reach. He then catches and devours the vulture, which gives him the strength to go on. The scene is a powerful one, a highlight both of the novel and of the Tarzan series as a whole.

On the other side of the desert Tarzan locates an ape band. While with them he once again encounters Bertha Kircher, who has just escaped from Sergeant Usanga, leader of a troop of native deserters from the German army, by whom she had been taken captive. Despite his suspicion of Bertha, Tarzan's natural chivalry leads him to grant her shelter and protection among the apes. Later he himself falls captive to the tribe of cannibals the deserters have sheltered among, along with Harold Percy Smith-Oldwick, a British aviator who has been forced down in the jungle. Learning of Tarzan's plight, Bertha heroically leads the apes against the natives and frees them both.

Smith-Oldwick becomes infatuated with Bertha, and they search for his downed plane. They find it, but are captured again by Usanga, who attempts to fly off in it with Bertha. Tarzan arrives in time to pull Usanga from the plane. Smith-Oldwick and Bertha Kircher then try to pilot it back across the desert to civilization, but fail to make it. Seeing the plane go down, Tarzan once more sets out to rescue them. On the way he encounters another Numa, this one an unusual black lion caught in a pit trap, and frees it.

He, the two lovers and the lion are soon reunited, but attacked by warriors from the lost city of Xuja, hidden in a secret desert valley. Tarzan is left for dead and Bertha and Smith-Oldwick taken prisoner. The Xujans are masters of the local lions and worshippers of parrots and monkeys. They are also completely insane as a consequence of long inbreeding. Recovering, Tarzan once more comes to the rescue of his companions, aided by the lion he had saved earlier. But the Xujans pursue them and they turn at bay to make one last stand. The day is saved by a search party from Smith-Oldwick's unit, who turn the tide.

Afterward, Tarzan and Smith-Oldwick find out that Bertha is a double agent who has actually been working for the British. Tarzan also learns from the diary of the deceased Fritz Schneider that Jane might still be alive.

=== Tarzan the Terrible (1921) ===
Two months have passed since the conclusion of the previous novel (#7) in which Tarzan spent many months wandering about Africa wreaking vengeance upon those whom he believed brutally murdered Jane. At the end of that novel Tarzan learns that her death was a ruse, that she had not been killed at all.

In attempting to track Jane, Tarzan has come to a hidden valley called Pal-ul-don filled with dinosaurs, notably the savage Triceratops-like Gryfs, which, unlike their prehistoric counterparts, are carnivorous and stand 20 feet tall at the shoulder. The lost valley is also home to two different adversarial races of tailed human-looking creatures: the hairless and white skinned, city-dwelling Ho-don and the hairy and black-skinned, hill-dwelling Waz-don. Tarzan befriends a Ho-don warrior, and the Waz-don chief, actuating some uncustomary relations. In this new world Tarzan becomes a captive but so impresses his captors with his accomplishments and skills that they name him Tarzan-Jad-Guru ('Tarzan the Terrible').

Having been brought there by her German captor, it turns out Jane is also being held captive in Pal-ul-don. She becomes a center-piece in a religious power struggle that consumes much of the novel until she escapes, after which her German captor becomes dependent on her due to his own lack of jungle survival skills.

With the aid of his native allies, Tarzan continues to pursue his beloved, going through an extended series of fights and escapes to do so. In the end success seems beyond even his ability to achieve, until in the final chapter he and Jane are saved by their son Korak, who has been searching for Tarzan just as Tarzan has been searching for Jane.

=== Tarzan and the Golden Lion (1922–1923) ===
The story picks up with the Clayton family, Tarzan, Jane and their son Korak, returning from their adventures in the previous novel (#8). Along the way they find an orphaned lion cub, which Tarzan takes home and trains.

Flora Hawkes, a previous housemaid of the Claytons, had overheard of Tarzan's discovery of the treasure chamber in the lost city of Opar (The Return of Tarzan, Tarzan and the Jewels of Opar) and had managed to copy his map to it. She concocted a plan to lead an expedition to collect the gold. As a contingency to discourage any local denizens from questioning them, she sought out and found a Tarzan look-alike to accompany them.

Two years passed since the Clayton family picked up their lion cub, and the Greystoke estate had become financially depleted due his support of the Allies war efforts, and he concluded it was time to return to Opar for another withdrawal.

Tarzan encountered Hawkes' party, where he was drugged and ended up in the hands of the Oparians. Queen La, who had come into disfavor with the high priest, felt she had nothing to lose by escaping with Tarzan through the only unguarded route—a path to the legendary valley of diamonds, from which no one had ever returned. There, Tarzan found a race of humans who were little better than animals in intelligence, being enslaved by a race of intelligent gorillas. With the help of his golden lion, Tarzan used the natives to restore La to power. Before leaving he accepted a bag of diamonds for a reward.

Meanwhile, the fake Tarzan convinced Tarzan's Waziri party to take the gold from Hawkes' party while most of them were out hunting. He then buried the gold so he could retain it later. The real Tarzan eventually confronted the fake, who managed to pilfer Tarzan's bag of diamonds. The fake was then chased by Tarzan's golden lion, but escaped into a river. He was later captured and permanently imprisoned by a local tribe. Tarzan lost the diamonds, but was able to attain the gold and return with it.

=== Tarzan and the Ant Men (1924) ===
Tarzan, the king of the jungle, enters an isolated country called Minuni, inhabited by a people four times smaller than himself. The Minunians live in magnificent city-states which frequently wage war against each other. Tarzan befriends the king, Adendrohahkis, and the prince, Komodoflorensal, of one such city-state, called Trohanadalmakus, and joins them in war against the onslaught of the army of Veltopismakus, their warlike neighbours. Tarzan is captured on the battle-ground and taken prisoner by the Veltopismakusians. The Veltopismakusian scientist Zoanthrohago conducts an experiment reducing Tarzan to the size of a Minunian, and the ape-man is imprisoned and enslaved among other Trohanadalmakusian prisoners of war. He meets, though, Komodoflorensal in the dungeons of Veltopismakus, and together they are able to make a daring escape.

=== Tarzan, Lord of the Jungle (1927–1928) ===
Tarzan finds an outpost of European knights and crusaders from a "forbidden valley" hidden in the mountains.

=== Tarzan and the Lost Empire (1928–1929) ===
Tarzan and a young German find a lost remnant of the Roman empire hidden in the mountains of Africa. This novel is notable for the introduction of Nkima, who serves as Tarzan's monkey companion in it and a number of later Tarzan stories. It also reintroduces Muviro, first seen in Tarzan and the Golden Lion, as sub-chief of Tarzan's Waziri warriors.

=== Tarzan at the Earth's Core (1929–1930) ===
In response to a radio plea from Abner Perry, a scientist who with his friend David Innes has discovered the interior world of Pellucidar at the Earth's core, Jason Gridley launches an expedition to rescue Innes from the Korsars (corsairs), the scourge of the internal seas. He enlists Tarzan, and a fabulous airship is constructed to penetrate Pellucidar via the natural polar opening connecting the outer and inner worlds. The airship is crewed primarily by Germans, with Tarzan's Waziri warriors under their chief Muviro also along for the expedition.

In Pellucidar Tarzan and Gridley are each separated from the main force of the expedition and must struggle for survival against the prehistoric creatures and peoples of the inner world. Gridley wins the love of the native cave-woman Jana, the Red Flower of Zoram. Eventually everyone is reunited, and the party succeeds in rescuing Innes.

As Tarzan and the others prepare to return home, Gridley decides to stay to search for Frederich Wilhelm Eric von Mendeldorf und von Horst, one last member of the expedition who remains lost (The missing Von Horst's adventures are told in a sequel, Back to the Stone Age, which event does not involve either Gridley or Tarzan).

=== Tarzan the Invincible (1930–1931) ===
Tarzan, his monkey friend Nkima, and Chief Muviro and his faithful Waziri warriors prevent Russian communists from looting the lost city of Opar.

=== Tarzan Triumphant (1931–1932) ===
Backed by Chief Muviro and his faithful Waziri warriors, Tarzan faces Soviet agents seeking revenge and a lost tribe descended from early Christians practicing a bizarre and debased version of the religion.

=== Tarzan and the City of Gold (1932) ===
After encountering and befriending Valthor, a warrior of the lost city of Athne (whom he rescues from a group of bandits known as shiftas), the City of Ivory and capital of the land of Thenar, Tarzan is captured by the insane yet beautiful queen Nemone of its hereditary enemy, Cathne, the City of Gold, capital of the land of Onthar. This novel is perhaps best known for two scenes; in the first, Tarzan is forced to fight Cathne's strongest man in its arena. While an ordinary man might have been in trouble, Tarzan easily overpowers his antagonist. The second scene, in which Tarzan is forced to fight a lion, starts with the ape man being forced to run away from a hunting lion, Belthar, which will hunt him down and kill him. Tarzan at first believes he can outrun the beast (lions tire after the first 100 yards at top speed). This lion, however, is of a breed specifically selected for endurance, and ultimately Tarzan must turn to face him, though aware that without a knife he can do little but delay the inevitable. Fortunately his own lion ally, Jad-bal-ja, whom he had raised from a cub, arrives and intervenes, killing Belthar and saving Tarzan. Nemone, who believes her life is linked to that of her pet, kills herself when it dies.

Unusually for lost cities in the Tarzan series, which are typically visited but once, Cathne and Athne reappear in a later Tarzan adventure, Tarzan the Magnificent. (The only other lost city Tarzan visits more than once is Opar.)

=== Tarzan and the Lion Man (1933–1934) ===
Tarzan discovers a mad scientist with a city of talking gorillas. To create additional havoc, a Hollywood film crew sets out to shoot a Tarzan movie in Africa and brings along an actor who is an exact double of the apeman himself, but is his opposite in courage and determination.

=== Tarzan and the Leopard Men (1932–1933) ===
An amnesiac Tarzan and his monkey companion Nkima are taken by an African warrior to be his guardian spirits, and as such come into conflict with the murderous secret society of the Leopard Men.

=== Tarzan's Quest (1935–1936) ===
Tarzan's wife Jane, in her first appearance in the series since Tarzan and the Ant Men, becomes involved in a search for a bloodthirsty lost tribe reputed to possess an immortality drug. Also drawn in are Tarzan and his monkey companion, little Nkima, and Chief Muviro and his faithful Waziri warriors, who are searching for Muviro's lost daughter Buira. Nkima's vital contribution to the adventure is recognized when he is made a recipient of the treatment along with the human protagonists at the end of the novel.

=== Tarzan and the Forbidden City (1938) ===
Tarzan cared little for the fate of adventurer Brian Gregory, drawn to the legendary city of Ashair by the rumor of the Father of Diamonds, the world's hugest gem. But to the ape-man the tie of friendship was unbreakable, and Paul d'Arnot's pleas moved him to agree to guide the expedition Gregory's father and sister organized for his rescue. The enigmatic Atan Thome was also obsessed with the Father of Diamonds, and planted agents in the Gregory safari to spy out its route and sabotage its efforts. Both parties reached their goal, remote Ashair... as prisoners of its priests, doomed to die in loathsome rites.

=== Tarzan the Magnificent (1936–1938) ===
Tarzan encounters a lost race with uncanny mental powers, after which he revisits the lost cities of Cathne and Athne, previously encountered in the earlier novel Tarzan and the City of Gold. As usual, he is backed up by Chief Muviro and his faithful Waziri warriors.

=== Tarzan and the Foreign Legion (1947) ===
While serving in the R.A.F. under his civilian name of John Clayton during World War II, Tarzan is shot down over the island of Sumatra in the Japanese-occupied Dutch East Indies. He uses his jungle survival skills to save his comrades in arms, and fight the Japanese while seeking escape from enemy territory.

=== Tarzan and the Madman (1964) ===
Tarzan tracks down yet another impostor resembling him, who is under the delusion he is Tarzan.

=== Tarzan and the Castaways (1965) ===
Collection of three unconnected short stories.

1. "Tarzan and the Castaways" (originally entitled "The Quest of Tarzan")
2. "Tarzan and the Champion"
3. "Tarzan and the Jungle Murders"

== Related works by Burroughs ==
=== The Eternal Lover and The Mad King (1914–15, 1925, 1926) ===
Originally written as a series of four novellas, they were first published as novels in 1925 and 1926.

The Eternal Lover recounts a sister and brother visiting the Greystoke estate in Africa before the first World War. While there, the sister falls unconscious, and remembers her adventures from a past life thousands of years ago. Tarzan makes occasional appearances as their present-day host.

The first half of The Mad King is set before the African visit, and focuses on the brother, finding out that they are related to the royalty of a small kingdom between Austria and Serbia. The second half is set after the African visit as the brother returns to the European kingdom on the eve of World War I. Tarzan does not appear in these two stories, although the sister from Eternal Lover does.

=== Tarzan and the Tarzan Twins (1927/1936) ===
Originally written as a pair of novellas specifically for younger readers, the two stories: "The Tarzan Twins" and "Tarzan and the Tarzan Twins, with Jad-bal-ja ('the Golden Lion') were published together in 1963. While the fact that they were written for children usually excludes them from lists of the main Tarzan novels, the family in the stories does make an appearance in Tarzan and the Lost Empire (1929).

=== Tarzan: The Lost Adventure (1995) ===
Eighty-three typed pages for an unfinished Tarzan novel were found in Burroughs' safe after his death. In the mid-1990s the Burroughs estate and Dark Horse Comics chose Joe R. Lansdale to revise and complete the novel which was released as a co-authored work in 1995.

== Licensed works ==
=== The Adventures of Tarzan (1921, 2006) ===
A licensed novelization serialized in 15 parts by newspapers in 1921. This work by Maude Robinson Toombs is based on the scripts for the 15-part film-serial of the same name, and was first released as a collected edition in 2006.

=== Tarzan the Mighty (1928, 2005) ===
A licensed novelization serialized in 15 parts by newspapers in 1928. This work by Arthur B. Reeve is based on the scripts for the 15-part film-serial of the same name, and was first released as a collected edition in 2005.

=== Tarzan and the Lost Safari (1957) ===
Novelization authorized by the Burroughs estate, based on the screenplay of the 1957 film. Published by Whitman Books.

=== Tarzan and the Valley of Gold (1966) ===
Authorized by the Burroughs estate as the 25th official novel, this work by Fritz Leiber is based on the screenplay for the film of the same name. The book includes footnotes connecting the story to events from Burroughs' twenty-four prior novels.

=== Tarzan: The Mark of the Red Hyena (1967) ===
A Whitman Big Little Book written by George S. Elrick, authorized by the Burroughs estate. Tarzan, Jane, Korak and the Waziri battle poachers led by a man who calls himself the Red Hyena.

=== Bunduki ===
J. T. Edson's Bunduki series, whose main characters Bunduki and Dawn are presented as having biographical connections with Burroughs' Tarzan characters (as reimagined in Philip José Farmer's Wold Newton family project), was initiated with permission from both Edgar Rice Burroughs, Inc. and Farmer. Sometime after 1976, after the first three Bunduki novels had been published, ERB Inc. withdrew Edson's permission to use the Tarzan name in future volumes; as a result, the fourth novel and subsequent short stories do not mention Tarzan or Jane by name.

=== Endless Quest Books (1985–86) ===
In the 1980s, TSR, Inc. published two Tarzan books as part of their Endless Quest gamebook series:

- Tarzan and the Well of Slaves (1985), by Douglas Niles ISBN 0-394-73968-X. Released as EQ #26.
- Tarzan and the Tower of Diamonds (1986), by Richard Reinsmith ISBN 0-394-74188-9. Released as EQ #31.

=== Tarzan: The Epic Adventures (1996) ===
The pilot episode of the 1996–1997 television series Tarzan: The Epic Adventures was adapted into an authorized 1996 novel by R. A. Salvatore. The book is nominally set during the middle of The Return of Tarzan as it chronicles a time after Tarzan returned to Africa from Paris, but before he married Jane.

=== The Dark Heart of Time (1999) ===
Following The Lost Adventure, the Burroughs estate authorized Philip Jose Farmer to write an official Tarzan novel, released in 1999 as The Dark Heart of Time. Best known for his Riverworld series, Philip Jose Farmer has also written a number of Tarzan-based pastiche works. He also authored Tarzan Alive: A Definitive Biography of Lord Greystoke (1972/2006), and two authorized Opar novels set thousands of years in the past: Hadon of Ancient Opar (1974) and Flight to Opar (1976).

Set in October 1918—during Tarzan's search for Jane—the novel takes place between Tarzan the Untamed and Tarzan the Terrible. The novel's antagonist is James D. Stonecraft, an American oil magnate who believes that Tarzan knows the secret of immortality. Stonecraft hires hunters to track and capture Tarzan for the secret, leading to a conflicts at the "City Built by God" and the "Crystal Tree of Time". Through all of the adventure Tarzan is focused on escaping his pursuers so that he may return to his search for his wife.

=== Young adult reboot ===
Author Andy Briggs has rebooted the series as young adult fiction, in the vein of Young Bond, with the first novel—Tarzan: The Greystoke Legacy—published in June 2011. The reboot is set in modern Africa and features Tarzan at around 18 and Jane as the teenage daughter of doctor turned illegal logger. The series includes:

- Tarzan: The Greystoke Legacy (2011)
- Tarzan: The Jungle Warrior (2012)
- Tarzan: The Savage Lands (2013)

=== The Wild Adventures series ===
Tarzan: Return to Pal-ul-don (2015): Author Will Murray's authorized sequel to Tarzan the Terrible. Released as The Wild Adventures of Edgar Rice Burroughs' Tarzan [volume 1].

Tarzan on the Precipice (2016): Michael A. Sanford's authorized novel covers events between Tarzan of the Apes and The Return of Tarzan. Tarzan, after concealing his true identity of Lord Greystoke from Jane Porter, journeys from Wisconsin north to Canada and uncovers an ancient civilization of Vikings. Released as The Wild Adventures of Edgar Rice Burroughs 2.

King Kong vs. Tarzan (2016): Will Murray's authorized novel details the encounter between the giant ape (shipwrecked in Africa while being transported from Skull Island to New York) and the apeman. Released as The Wild Adventures of King Kong [book 1].

Tarzan Trilogy (2016): Thomas Zachek's authorized collection of Tarzan novellas relates three African adventures of the Ape Man in the run-up to World War II. Released as The Wild Adventures of Edgar Rice Burroughs Series 3.

Tarzan: The Greystoke Legacy Under Siege (2017): Ralph N. Laughlin and Ann E. Johnson's authorized novel featuring four generations of Tarzan's family under threat in the 1980s. Released as The Wild Adventures of Edgar Rice Burroughs Series 4.

Tarzan and the Revolution (2018): Thomas Zachek's authorized novel featuring the role of Tarzan, the Waziri, and the lost city of Opar in events involving an emerging central African nation threatened by dictatorship. Released as The Wild Adventures of Edgar Rice Burroughs Series 8.

Tarzan: Conqueror of Mars (2020): Will Murray's authorized novel in which Tarzan is transported to Mars and seeks out John Carter to in order to get home. Released as The Wild Adventures of Edgar Rice Burroughs Series 9.

Tarzan: Back to Mars (2023): Will Murray's authorized novel in which Tarzan meets Sherlock Holmes and returns to Mars. Released as The Wild Adventures of Edgar Rice Burroughs Series 12.

=== Edgar Rice Burroughs Universe Series ===
Tarzan and the Dark Heart of Time (2018): Reissue of Philip Jose Farmer's authorized novel The Dark Heart of Time: A Tarzan Novel (1999). Re-released as Edgar Rice Burroughs Universe 1.

Tarzan and the Valley of Gold (2019). Reissue of Fritz Leiber's authorized novel from 1966. Re-released under the Edgar Rice Burroughs Universe banner.

Tarzan: Battle For Pellucidar (2020). In Win Scott Eckert's authorized novel, Tarzan returns to the Earth's core on a mission to stop Nazis from obtaining a powerful super weapon. Released under the Edgar Rice Burrough Universe banner.

Tarzan and the Forest of Stone (2022): An authorized novella written by Jeffrey J. Mariotte. The story takes place after the events of Burrough's Tarzan and the Lion Man.

== Critical reception ==
While Tarzan of the Apes met with some critical success, subsequent books in the series received a cooler reception and have been criticized for being derivative and formulaic. The characters are often said to be two-dimensional, the dialogue wooden, and the storytelling devices (such as excessive reliance on coincidence) strain credulity. While Burroughs is not a polished novelist, he is a vivid storyteller, and many of his novels are still in print. In 1963, author Gore Vidal wrote a piece on the Tarzan series that, while pointing out several of the deficiencies that the Tarzan books have as works of literature, praises Edgar Rice Burroughs for creating a compelling "daydream figure."

Despite critical panning, the Tarzan stories have been amazingly popular. Fans love his melodramatic situations and the elaborate details he works into his fictional world, such as his construction of a partial language for his great apes.

Since the beginning of the 1970s, Tarzan books and movies have often been criticized as being blatantly racist. The early books often give a negative and stereotypical portrayal of native Africans, both Arab and black. In The Return of Tarzan, Arabs are "surly looking" and say things like "dog of a Christian," while blacks are "lithe, ebon warriors, gesticulating and jabbering." He used every ploy for the purpose of painting his antagonists in simple unflattering colors. While he commonly uses racial stereotypes of black people, his later books also contain black characters that are good-hearted, generous, and intelligent. At the end of Tarzan And The Jewels Of Opar (1918), the fifth book in the twenty-four-book series, Burroughs writes, "Lord and Lady Greystoke with Basuli and Mugambi rode together at the head of the column, laughing and talking together in that easy familiarity which common interests and mutual respect breed between honest and intelligent men of any races." Burroughs explains somewhat Tarzan's attitudes toward people in general in Tarzan And The City Of Gold (1933), where he writes, "Ordinarily, Tarzan was no more concerned by the fate of a white man than by that of a black man or any other created thing to which he was not bound by ties of friendship; the life of a man meant less to Tarzan of the Apes than the life of an ape."

Other ethnic groups and social classes are likewise rendered as stereotypes; this was the custom in popular fiction of the time. A Swede has "a long yellow moustache, an unwholesome complexion, and filthy nails" and Russians cheat at cards. The aristocracy (excepting the House of Greystoke) and royalty are invariably effete.

In later books, there is an attempt to portray Africans in a more realistic light. For example, in Tarzan's Quest, while the hero is still Tarzan, and the black Africans relatively primitive, they are portrayed as individuals, with good and bad traits, and the main villains have white skins. Burroughs never does get over his distaste for European royalty, though.

Burroughs' opinions, made known mainly through the narrative voice in the stories, reflect attitudes widely held in his time, which in a 21st-century context would be considered racist and sexist. The author is not especially mean-spirited in his attitudes. His heroes do not engage in violence against women or in racially motivated violence. Still, a superior-inferior relationship between races is plain and occasionally explicit. According to James Loewen's Sundown Towns, this may be a vestige of Burroughs having been from Oak Park, Illinois, a former Sundown town (a town that forbids non-whites from living within it) – or it may very well be the fact these were common attitudes at the turn of the century.

Some defenders of the Tarzan series argue that some of the words Burroughs uses to describe Africans, such as "savage," were generally understood to have a different and less offensive meaning in the early 20th century than they do today.

== Unauthorized works ==
After Burroughs' death a number of writers produced new Tarzan stories without the permission of his estate. In some instances, the estate managed to prevent publication of such unauthorized pastiches. The most notable exception in the United States was a series of five novels by the pseudonymous "Barton Werper" that appeared 1964–65 by Gold Star Books. As a result of legal action by Edgar Rice Burroughs, Inc., they were taken off the market.

The five novels in this series included:

- Tarzan and the Silver Globe (Derby: Connecticut: New International Library/Gold Star Books, 1964), the novel was rewritten as "Zamba and the Silver Globe" and published by Fiction House Press in October 2014.
- Tarzan and the Cave City (Derby: Connecticut: New International Library/Gold Star Books, 1964)
- Tarzan and the Snake People (Derby: Connecticut: New International Library/Gold Star Books, 1964)
- Tarzan and the Abominable Snowmen (Derby: Connecticut: New International Library/Gold Star Books, 1965)
- Tarzan and the Winged Invaders (Derby: Connecticut: New International Library/Gold Star Books, 1965)

In the 1950s, under the pseudonym John Bloodstone, writer Stuart J. Byrne wrote the novel Tarzan on Mars, with Tarzan going to Barsoom, the planet Mars from John Carter's stories. He did not obtain a license to publish the novel, but unauthorized editions have been published since then.

=== Unauthorized works in Israel and the Arab world ===
In Israel in the 1950s and early 1960s there was a thriving industry of locally produced Tarzan adventures published weekly in 24-page brochures by several competing publishing houses, none of which bothered to get any authorization from the Burroughs estate. The stories featured Tarzan in contemporary Africa, a popular theme being his fighting against the Mau Mau in 1950s Kenya and single-handedly crushing their revolt several times over. He also fought a great variety of monsters, vampires and invaders from outer space infesting the African jungles, and discovered several more lost cities and cultures in addition to the ones depicted in the Burroughs canon. Some brochures had him meet with Israelis and take Israel's side against her Arab enemies, especially Nasser's Egypt. None of the brochures ever bore a writer's name, and the various publishers—"Elephant Publishing" (Hebrew: הוצאת הפיל), "Rhino Publishing" (Hebrew: הוצאת הקרנף) and several similar names—provided no more of an address than POB numbers in Tel Aviv and Jerusalem. These Tarzan brochures were extremely popular among Israeli youths of the time, successfully competing with the numerous Hebrew translations of the original Tarzan novels. The Tarzan brochures faded out by the middle 1960s.

The popularity of Tarzan in Israel had some effect on the spoken Hebrew language. As it happens, "tarzan" (Hebrew: טרזן) is a long-established Hebrew word, translatable as "dandy, fop, coxcomb" (according to R. Alcalay's Complete Hebrew-English Dictionary of 1990). However, a word could not survive with that meaning while being identical with the name of a popular fictional character usually depicted as wearing a loincloth and jumping from tree to tree in the jungle. Since the 1950s the word in its original meaning has completely disappeared from the spoken language, and is virtually unknown to Hebrew speakers at present—though still duly appearing in dictionaries.

In the 1950s new Tarzan stories were also published in Syria and Lebanon. Tarzan in these versions was a staunch supporter of the Arab cause and helped his Arab friends foil various fiendish Israeli plots.

== See also ==
- Tarzan in film and other non-print media
- Tarzan in comics

== Bibliography ==
- Bräunlein, Peter. 2004. "Ein weißer Mann in Afrika. Rassismus und Geschlechterverhältnisse in Tarzanfilmen." iz3w 280:41–43.
- Carey-Webb, Allen. 1992. "'Heart of Darkness', 'Tarzan', and the 'Third World'. Canons and Encounters in World Literature, English 109." College Literature 19:121–41.
- Cheyfitz, Eric. 1991. The Poetics of Imperialism: Translation and Colonization from The Tempest to Tarzan. Oxford: Oxford University Press.
- Holtsmark, Erling B. 1981. Tarzan and Tradition: Classical Myth in Popular Literature. Westport, CT: Greenwood Press.
- Morton, Walt. 1993. "Tracking the Sign of Tarzan: Trans-Media Representation of a Pop-Culture Icon." In You Tarzan: Masculinity, Movies and Men, edited by P. Kirkham and J. Thumin. New York: St. Martin's Press.
- Ukadike, Nwachukwu Frank. 1994. Black African Cinema. University of California Press. pp. 40–52.
- Utz, Richard J., ED. 1995. Investigating the Unliterary: Six Readings of 'Tarzan of the Apes'. Regensburg: Martzinek.
