= Tarzan and the Castaways =

1965 collection of three stories by Edgar Rice Burroughs

- Original dust-jacket illustration
- Author: Edgar Rice Burroughs
- Illustrator: Frank Frazetta
- Cover artist: Frank Frazetta
- Language: English
- Series: Tarzan
- Genre: Adventure
- Publisher: Canaveral Press
- Publication date: 1965
- Publication place: United States
- Media type: Print (hardback)
- Pages: 229
- Preceded by: Tarzan and the Madman
- Followed by: Tarzan and the Valley of Gold

Tarzan and the Castaways is a collection of three stories by American writer Edgar Rice Burroughs, the 24th and final in his series of twenty-four books about the jungle hero Tarzan. The title novella, and the two short stories were first published in pulp magazines in 1940 and 1941. The combined book was published first as a hardcover by Canaveral Press in early 1965, and as a paperback by Ballantine Books in July 1965.

== Stories ==
=== Tarzan and the Castaways ===
Written starting in November 1940, and first published as a three-part serial in Argosy Weekly (1941, August 23 & 30 and September 6) as “The Quest of Tarzan”. The story was retitled for the eponymous 1965 novel to avoid confusion with the earlier novel Tarzan's Quest.

Tarzan is stranded on an uncharted Pacific island inhabited by the remnant of a lost Maya civilization.

=== Tarzan and the Jungle Murders ===
Written in January 1939, and first published in Thrilling Adventures (June 1940).

In seven chapters, Tarzan applies his jungle lore to solving the mystery of the disappearance of some people after their airplane has crashed in the jungle. In the first chapter, Tarzan finds a downed Italian plane, with the pilot dead, not from the crash but from a bullet wound. Footprints tell Tarzan others left the wreckage on foot. The development of a new device that will disrupt the ignition system of an internal combustion engine has spies from Russia, Italy, and England scrambling for possession. In the battle for possession of the plans, Tarzan is captured by cannibals and escapes by calling elephants to rescue him. As the three factions tangle and intermix, Tarzan visits and is (falsely) identified as the murderer of one of the party. Tarzan vindicates himself with evidence which he says is unnecessary, because he already knew the guilty party by his scent.

As a mystery story, Stan Galloway concludes, “… any avid mystery reader will leave ‘Jungle Murders’ saying the author didn't play fair” because the scent clue is not transferable to the reader.

=== Tarzan and the Champion ===
Written in July 1939, and first published in Blue Book (April 1940).

Tarzan, his monkey companion Nkima, Chief Muviro, and the Waziri warriors confront an American prizefighter, One-Punch Mullargan, who has come to Africa to hunt the wildlife, using a machine-gun. Both Tarzan and Mullargan are captured by cannibals, from whom they escape with heroic acts. Tarzan banishes Mullargan from Africa at the story's end.

Stan Galloway writes: “Mullargan’s ambiguous character development, beginning as a thoughtless hunter ending with some questionable thoughts, leaves the story thought-provoking without being poignant.” David A. Adams described the story as a “…kind of ‘tongue-in-cheek’ joke that really never comes off as being all that funny. One serious moment in this little piece of fluff is Tarzan's lecture about suffering animals.”

== Comic adaptations ==
The three stories in the book were adapted into comic form by Joe Kubert and published by DC Comics:

- “Tarzan and the Castaways” in Tarzan #240–243 (1975, August – November).
- “Tarzan and the Jungle Murders” in Tarzan #245 & 246 (1976, January & February).
- “Tarzan and the Champion” in Tarzan #248 & 249 (1976, April & May).

Preceded by Tarzan and the Madman	Tarzan series Tarzan and the Castaways	Succeeded by Tarzan and the Valley of Gold
