= Tarzan the Magnificent (book) =

Novel by Edgar Rice Burroughs

- Dust-jacket illustration of Tarzan the Magnificent
- Author: Edgar Rice Burroughs
- Illustrator: John Coleman Burroughs
- Language: English
- Series: Tarzan series
- Genre: Adventure
- Publisher: Edgar Rice Burroughs, Inc.
- Publication date: 1936-1938
- Publication place: United States
- Media type: Print (hardback)
- Pages: 318
- Preceded by: Tarzan and the Forbidden City
- Followed by: Tarzan and the Foreign Legion

Tarzan the Magnificent is a 1939 book by American writer Edgar Rice Burroughs, the twenty-first in his series of twenty-four books about the title character Tarzan. It was originally published as two separate stories serialized in different pulp magazines; "Tarzan and the Magic Men" in Argosy from September to October, 1936, and "Tarzan and the Elephant Men" in Blue Book from November 1937 to January 1938. The two stories were combined under the title Tarzan the Magnificent in the first book edition, published in 1939 by Edgar Rice Burroughs, Inc.

In order of writing, the book follows Tarzan's Quest and precedes Tarzan and the Forbidden City. In order of book publication it falls between the latter and Tarzan and the Foreign Legion. The novel's plot bears no relation to that of the 1960 film of the same title.

The plot features "two warring tribes", the Kajis and the Zulis, and revolves around a treasure.

== Plot ==
Tarzan encounters a lost race with uncanny mental powers, after which he revisits the lost cities of Cathne and Athne, previously encountered in the earlier novel Tarzan and the City of Gold. As usual, he is backed up by Chief Muviro and his faithful Waziri warriors.

Preceded by Tarzan and the Forbidden City	Tarzan series Tarzan the Magnificent	Succeeded by Tarzan and the Foreign Legion
