= Tarzan and the Lion Man =

Novel by Edgar Rice Burroughs

- Dust-jacket illustration of Tarzan and the Lion Man
- Author: Edgar Rice Burroughs
- Illustrator: J. Allen St. John
- Language: English
- Series: Tarzan series
- Genre: Adventure
- Publisher: Edgar Rice Burroughs, Inc.
- Publication date: 1933-1934
- Publication place: United States
- Media type: Print (hardback)
- Pages: 318
- Preceded by: Tarzan and the City of Gold
- Followed by: Tarzan and the Leopard Men
- Text: Tarzan and the Lion Man at Wikisource

Tarzan and the Lion Man is a novel by American writer Edgar Rice Burroughs, the seventeenth in his series of twenty-four books about the title character Tarzan. The novel was originally serialized in the magazine Liberty from November 1933 through January 1934.

It satirizes Hollywood's treatment of the Tarzan character and even spoofs Burroughs' own work. It was written at a time when Johnny Weissmuller was becoming a movie star by playing Tarzan as an illiterate character, to Burroughs' open displeasure.

== Plot summary ==
Tarzan and his lion companion Jad-bal-ja discover a mad scientist with a city of talking gorillas. To create additional havoc, a Hollywood film crew sets out to shoot a Tarzan movie in Africa and brings along an actor who is an exact double of the apeman, but is his opposite in courage and determination.

Later, as John Clayton, Tarzan visits Hollywood to find himself in a screen test for a role in a Tarzan movie. He is deemed unsuitable for the lead role because he is "not the type."

== Comic adaptations ==
The book has been adapted into comic form by Gold Key Comics in Tarzan no. 206, dated February 1972, with a script by Gaylord DuBois and art by Paul Norris, and later by DC Comics in Tarzan nos. 231-234, dated July 1974-January 1975, adapted by Joe Kubert.

Preceded by Tarzan and the City of Gold	Tarzan series Tarzan and the Lion Man	Succeeded by Tarzan and the Leopard Men
