= Tarzan and the Forbidden City =

1938 novel by Edgar Rice Burroughs

- Dust-jacket illustration of Tarzan and the Forbidden City
- Author: Edgar Rice Burroughs
- Illustrator: John Coleman Burroughs
- Language: English
- Series: Tarzan series
- Genre: Adventure
- Publisher: Edgar Rice Burroughs, Inc.
- Publication date: 1938
- Publication place: United States
- Media type: Print (hardback)
- Pages: 315
- Preceded by: Tarzan's Quest
- Followed by: Tarzan the Magnificent

Tarzan and the Forbidden City is a novel by American writer Edgar Rice Burroughs, the twentieth in his series of twenty-four books about the title character Tarzan. Previous to its publication in book form, it was serialized during 1938 in Argosy magazine under the title The Red Star of Tarzan.

== Plot summary ==
A young man named Brian Gregory has disappeared in Africa, looking for the fabled Father of Diamonds; his father and sister want to go rescue him, and they can only enlist Tarzan's help because they know Captain Paul D'Arnot. By chance, Tarzan and Brian are lookalikes, thus making some vile scoundrels think Tarzan is Brian. They are also heading out after the big old diamond.

The Forbidden City is again in a secret valley, with two cities, Ashair and Thobos, at war because of the Father of Diamonds. Tarzan has to fight many times against different foes, once even a man-sized unicorn seahorse!

== Media adaptations ==
The book has been adapted into the radio series Tarzan and the Diamond of Ashair'', and into comic form by Gold Key Comics in Tarzan nos. 190-191, dated October–November 1970, with a script by Gaylord DuBois and art by Paul Norris and Nat Edson.

It was also the basis for an episode of the Filmation Tarzan, Lord of the Jungle animated cartoon in 1976, and an episode of Tarzan: The Epic Adventures in 1997.

Preceded by Tarzan's Quest	Tarzan series Tarzan and the Forbidden City	Succeeded by Tarzan the Magnificent
