= Tarzan and the City of Gold =

1932 novel by Edgar Rice Burroughs

- Dust-jacket illustration of Tarzan and the City of Gold
- Author: Edgar Rice Burroughs
- Illustrator: J. Allen St. John
- Language: English
- Series: Tarzan series
- Genre: Adventure
- Publisher: Edgar Rice Burroughs, Inc.
- Publication date: 1932
- Publication place: United States
- Media type: Print (hardback)
- Pages: 316
- Preceded by: Tarzan Triumphant
- Followed by: Tarzan and the Lion Man

Tarzan and the City of Gold is a novel by American writer Edgar Rice Burroughs, the sixteenth in his series of twenty-four books about the title character Tarzan. The novel was originally serialized in the magazine Argosy from March through April 1932.

== Plot summary ==
Tarzan rescues a warrior from a group of bandits known as shiftas, and learns that he is Valthor, a warrior of the lost city of Athne, the City of Ivory and capital of the land of Thenar. Tarzan is then captured by the insane yet beautiful queen Nemone of its hereditary enemy, Cathne, the City of Gold, capital of the land of Onthar. This novel is perhaps best known for two scenes; in the first, Tarzan is forced to fight Cathne's strongest man Phobeg in its arena. While an ordinary man might have been in trouble, Tarzan easily overpowers Phobeg.

The second scene, in which Tarzan is forced to fight a lion, starts with the ape man being forced to run away from a hunting lion, Belthar, which will hunt him down and kill him. Tarzan at first believes he can outrun the beast (lions tire after the first 100 yards at top speed). This lion, however, is of a breed specifically selected for endurance, and ultimately Tarzan must turn to face him, though aware that without a knife he can do little but delay the inevitable. His own lion ally, Jad-bal-ja, whom he had raised from a cub, arrives and intervenes, killing Belthar and saving Tarzan. Nemone, who believes her life is linked to that of her pet, kills herself when it dies.

Unusually for lost cities in Burroughs' Tarzan series, which are typically visited but once, Cathne and Athne reappear in a later Tarzan adventure, Tarzan the Magnificent. (The only other lost city that Tarzan visits more than once is Opar, which appears in four novels and is referenced in a juvenile story).

== Adaptations ==
The book has been adapted into comic form by Gold Key Comics in Tarzan nos. 186-187, dated June–July 1970, with a script by Gaylord DuBois and art by Doug Wildey.

In the cartoon series Tarzan, Lord of the Jungle, elements from this story were used in "Tarzan and the City of Gold," "Tarzan's Return to the City of Gold," and "Tarzan and the Soul Stealer." A big difference is that the City of Gold was renamed Zandor and had been at war with Athne. In all three episodes, Tarzan had to deal with Queen Nemone (voiced by Joan Gerber in the first two appearances, Hettie Lynn Hurtes in the third appearance) and Tomos (voiced by Alan Oppenheimer). Another difference is that Phobeg (voiced by Ted Cassidy in the first two appearances, Alan Oppenheimer in the third appearance) becomes Tarzan's ally in those episodes.

Preceded by Tarzan Triumphant	Tarzan series Tarzan and the City of Gold	Succeeded by Tarzan and the Lion Man
