= Tarzan and the Leopard Men =

1933 novel by Edgar Rice Burroughs

- Dust-jacket illustration of Tarzan and the Leopard Men
- Author: Edgar Rice Burroughs
- Illustrator: J. Allen St. John
- Language: English
- Series: Tarzan series
- Genre: Adventure
- Publisher: Edgar Rice Burroughs, Inc.
- Publication date: 1932-1933
- Publication place: United States
- Media type: Print (hardback)
- Pages: 332
- Preceded by: Tarzan and the Lion Man
- Followed by: Tarzan's Quest

Tarzan and the Leopard Men is a novel by American writer Edgar Rice Burroughs, the eighteenth in his series of twenty-four books about the title character Tarzan. The story was serialized in The Blue Book Magazine from August 1932 to January 1933, and published in book form in 1935. Its plot has nothing in common with the 1946 film Tarzan and the Leopard Woman.

== Plot ==
An amnesiac Tarzan and his monkey companion Nkima are taken by an African warrior to be his guardian spirits, and as such come into conflict with the murderous secret society of the Leopard Men, led by Gato Mgungu.

From America, a young woman arrives in the territory in search of a loved one presumed missing, and two young men (also from that country) come in search of ivory.

Preceded by Tarzan and the Lion Man	Tarzan series Tarzan and the Leopard Men	Succeeded by Tarzan's Quest
