= Nkima =

- Tarzan & Nkima (Filmation series)
- First appearance: Tarzan and the Lost Empire
- Created by: Edgar Rice Burroughs
- Portrayed by: Jiggs (1935 film)
- Voiced by: Lou Scheimer

In-universe information
- Species: Monkey
- Gender: Male

Nkima is a fictional character in Edgar Rice Burroughs' Tarzan novels, and in adaptations of the saga to other media, particularly comics. His name comes from either the word N'kima ('monkey' in the Mbugu language, a regional dialect of Swahili), or, after the Meru language nickname for Ugali, a dish popular in Kenya and Tanzania made from maize flour (if the latter, it would be similar to a European giving a child the nickname 'donut' -- a playful, condescending-yet-benevolent term of endearment).

== Character ==
An African monkey, Nkima serves as a companion and servile assistant to Tarzan; provides comic relief in storylines; covertly conveys messages between Tarzan and his allies (rarely targeted by adversaries, who underestimate and overlook him); and, even occasionally leads Tarzan's Waziri warrior and/or animal friends to the ape-man's rescue. Overall, Nkima's role in the novels is somewhat similar to that of Cheeta the chimpanzee in the Tarzan movies. He is portrayed as being especially close to Jad-bal-ja, the lion who served as Tarzan's other primary animal companion.

In personality, Nkima is fearful and paranoid when alone, miserably certain that all other jungle creatures view him as prey. When with Tarzan he is emboldened, becoming proud, boastful, and bloodthirsty, constantly urging his protector to kill any strange animal they encounter. However, he is also fiercely loyal, often providing valuable assistance to the ape-man at great personal risk. In Tarzan's Quest, Nkima's merit was recognized when he was given an immortality treatment along with the novel's human protagonists.

== In the Tarzan novels ==
Monkeys friendly to Tarzan and his allies appear under the generic name of Manu ("monkey" in the ape language) in a number of early Tarzan novels, including the fourth Tarzan novel (1915's The Son of Tarzan), the sixth (chronologically earlier) Tarzan novel (1919's Jungle Tales of Tarzan), the seventh (1920's Tarzan the Untamed) and the ninth (1922's Tarzan and the Golden Lion). Some of these precursors to Nkima may in fact be Nkima himself, before he received that name. The first appearance of Nkima by name, however, is in the twelfth Tarzan novel (1928's Tarzan and the Lost Empire). The character re-appears in the fourteenth (1930's Tarzan the Invincible); eighteenth (1932's Tarzan and the Leopard Men); nineteenth (1936's Tarzan's Quest); twenty-fourth (1965's Tarzan and the Castaways—a collection of stories, Nkima is in one of them, the 1939 short story "Tarzan and the Champion"); and twenty-sixth (1995's Tarzan: the Lost Adventure) books. Nkima is also mentioned in passing in the twenty-second novel, Tarzan and the Foreign Legion (1947).

== In other media ==
The character of Nkima was also featured in the Tarzan comic strip and comic books, both in adaptations of the original/Burroughs novels, and in stories newly written for those media. He had one film appearance, in the 1935 serial, The New Adventures of Tarzan (also released in 1938 as the feature film, Tarzan and the Green Goddess—although re-cast as a chimpanzee and portrayed by Jiggs, the same chimp that originated the role of "Cheeta" in the Johnny Weissmuller Tarzan films).

Nkima was also a main character in Filmation's 1976–1981, Saturday morning animated series Tarzan, Lord of the Jungle; the depiction was faithful to Burroughs' characterization. His monkey-like 'speech' was voiced by Lou Scheimer.
