= Tarzan and the Madman =

1964 novel by Edgar Rice Burroughs

- Dust-jacket illustration of Tarzan and the Madman
- Author: Edgar Rice Burroughs
- Illustrator: Reed Crandall
- Cover artist: Reed Crandall
- Language: English
- Series: Tarzan series
- Genre: Adventure
- Publisher: Canaveral Press
- Publication date: June 15, 1964
- Publication place: United States
- Media type: Print (hardback)
- Pages: 236
- Preceded by: Tarzan and the Foreign Legion
- Followed by: Tarzan and the Castaways

Tarzan and the Madman is a novel by American writer Edgar Rice Burroughs, the twenty-third in his series of twenty-four books about the title character Tarzan. Written from January to February 1940, the story was never published in Burroughs' lifetime. The book was first published in hardcover by Canaveral Press in June 1964 and in paperback by Ballantine Books in February 1965.

== Plot summary ==
Tarzan tracks down a man who has been mistaken for him. The man is under the delusion that he is Tarzan, and he is living in a lost city inhabited by people descended from early Portuguese explorers. Burroughs had previously employed the plot devices of a lost city and a Tarzan double or impostor in earlier Tarzan novels.

== Notes ==
Preceded by Tarzan and the Foreign Legion	Tarzan series Tarzan and the Madman	Succeeded by Tarzan and the Castaways
