= Tarzan: The Epic Adventures =

Television series

- Logo of "Tarzan: The Epic Adventures"
- Genre: Action; Adventure; Science fantasy
- Based on: Characters created by Edgar Rice Burroughs
- Developed by: Christopher A. Roosen
- Starring: Joe Lara; Aaron Seville; Don McLeod; Nkhensani Manganyi
- Composer: Michael Benghiat
- Country of origin: United States
- No. of seasons: 1
- No. of episodes: 22

Production
- Executive producers: Max Keller; Micheline Keller; Paul Siegel; Henry Siegel
- Producer: Joe Lara
- Running time: 45 minutes
- Production companies: Keller Siegel Entertainment; Keller Entertainment Group

Original release
- Network: First-run syndication
- Release: August 28, 1996 – May 25, 1997

Tarzan: The Epic Adventures is an American adventure drama series that aired for one season in syndication from August 28, 1996, until May 25, 1997. It focuses on the character of Tarzan in his early years, after his first exposure to civilization, but before his marriage to Jane. The inclusion of the character Nicholas Rokoff, and the fact that Tarzan is not yet married, sets this series in-between the two halves of The Return of Tarzan. The series uses much of the mythology of Edgar Rice Burroughs' books as background material.

This version of Tarzan was filmed in the Sun City resort in South Africa, making it one of the few Tarzan productions to actually film on that continent. The pilot was filmed in the Orlando, Florida area using locations such as the Moroccan pavilion at Epcot, the Universal Studios NYC area and a miniature golf course waterfall.

== Plot ==
The series begins with Tarzan, still living in Europe, returning home to Africa to foil the plans of the evil Count Rokoff. After defeating both Rokoff and his accomplice, Mora, queen of the flesh-eating monsters known as Mahars that live in Pellucidar, a world below the surface of the Earth (Which Tarzan visited in the novel Tarzan at the Earth's Core), Tarzan decides to stay in Africa, and is reunited with his old friend Themba, who joins him in his adventures.

Similar to shows like Hercules: The Legendary Journeys, The Adventures of Sinbad, and The New Adventures of Robin Hood, the series places a heavy emphasis on fantasy. Among the common elements present were evil sorcerers, magical beings, journeys to other realms, and hidden civilizations. The show also had the recurring theme of who Tarzan really was, and the mystery of where Themba's tribe had vanished to.

== Cast ==
- Joe Lara as Tarzan/John Clayton
- Aaron Seville as Themba
- Lydie Denier as Collette de Coude
- Andrew Divoff as Nicholas Rokoff
- Dennis Christopher as Paul D’Arnot
- Ralph Wilcox as Mugambi
- Angela Harry as La
- Cory Everson as Mara

Notes: Lara also played Tarzan in the otherwise unrelated CBS television movie Tarzan in Manhattan. Denier played Jane Porter in the previous Tarzán television series. Some of Tarzan's yells were archived yells by Johnny Weissmuller who played Tarzan in several films in the 1930s and 40s.

== Episodes ==
No.	Title	Original release date
1–2	"Tarzan's Return"	August 28, 1996
Tarzan must stop the plans of the evil Count Nicholas Rokoff and the Mahars. Note: Aired as a two-hour special premiere.
3	"Tarzan and the Leopard Queen" "Tarzan and the Leopard Woman"	September 28, 1996
Tarzan is reunited with his old friend Themba, but their reunion is put on hold when Wazi people are being kidnapped by the Leopard Men.
4	"Tarzan and the Lost Legion"	October 5, 1996
When Themba is kidnapped by Roman centurions, Tarzan finds himself working with a young woman to overthrow her evil uncle.
5	"Tarzan and the Scarlet Diamond"	October 12, 1996
An evil explorer pits two tribes, the other being lizard men, against each other for his own plans.
6	"Tarzan and the Black Orchid"	October 19, 1996
Tarzan must find a legendary plant to save Themba when he's infected with a strange disease.
7	"Tarzan and the Reflections in an Evil Eye"	October 26, 1996
An evil medicine man hits Tarzan with a spell that divides the two halves of him: the human he is, and the ape he was raised as.
8	"Tarzan and the Priestess of Opar"	November 2, 1996
The Lord of the Jungle becomes the object of affection for the priestess, La.
9	"Tarzan and the Fury of the Zadu"	November 9, 1996
A sudden eclipse turns a tribe into savages, and Tarzan reluctantly asks for La's help to stop the evil spirit controlling them...which is also trying to possess the ape man.
10	"Tarzan and the Revenge of Zimpala"	November 16, 1996
The brother of the hunter who killed Kala seeks revenge on Tarzan.
11	"Tarzan and the Return of KuKulcan"	November 23, 1996
When Tashi is bitten by a snake, Tarzan and Themba take her to see a Mayan healer for help, but are soon caught up in the plans of the evil Snake People.
12	"Tarzan and the White Pebble"	January 26, 1997
An oracle challenges Tarzan with a series of tests.
13	"Tarzan and the Moon God"	February 2, 1997
A trio of pirates steal a statue from a tribe which holds a greater meaning than previously believed.
14	"Tarzan and the Forbidden City"	February 9, 1997
When an old friend goes missing, Tarzan must work with the man's sister to rescue him, unaware of her true motives.
15	"Tarzan and the Leopard Demon"	February 16, 1997
Tarzan must rescue an old friend from the Leopard Demon.
16	"Tarzan and the Demon Within"	February 23, 1997
Tarzan must overcome his claustrophobia to save Themba. Note: Clipshow episode.
17	"Tarzan and the Mahars"	March 2, 1997
In a followup to the pilot, the Mahars return, and Tarzan must reluctantly work with Rokoff to stop them.
18	"Tarzan and the Amtorans"	April 27, 1997
Tarzan finds himself transported to an alien world after he's accused of murder. Crossover with another Edgar Rice Burroughs creation, Carson Napier of Venus.
19	"Tarzan and the Beast of Dunali"	May 4, 1997
Tarzan investigates a series of murders supposedly committed by apes. But the truth is far more disturbing...
20	"Tarzan and the Shadow of Anger"	May 11, 1997
Tarzan must overcome mind control to stop a creature.
21	"Tarzan and the Mystery of the Lake"	May 18, 1997
A group of explorers make two discoveries: a creature that may be the missing link... and a prehistoric monster living in a lake.
22	"Tarzan and the Circus Hunter"	May 25, 1997
A trip turns deadly when Tarzan is caught up in a murder.

=== Planned second season ===
A second season was planned to air, but with actor Xavier DeClie replacing Lara in the lead, and Julie St. Claire cast as Jane. However, bankruptcy proceedings were initiated against the show's distributor Seagull Entertainment in summer 1997, and a second season was never produced.

== Novel ==
Tarzan: The Epic Adventures
- Author: R. A. Salvatore
- Series: Tarzan (book series)
- Publisher: Del Rey
- Publication date: October 1996
- Media type: trade-paperback
- Pages: 279
- ISBN: 0-345-40810-1
- Preceded by: Tarzan: The Lost Adventure (1995)
- Followed by: The Dark Heart of Time (1999)

R. A. Salvatore wrote an authorized Tarzan novel based on pilot script which was published as a trade-paperback in 1996, and a mass-market paperback in 1997.

Nikolas Rokoff—Tarzan's nemesis from the first half of The Return of Tarzan—has a stolen crystal amulet with mystical power. The crystal can open gateways to the savage land of Pellucidar, and in so doing allows reptilian humanoids known as Mahars to attack the surface world. Tarzan therefore has to stop not only Rokoff, but also Mora, the Queen of the Mahars.

Preceded by Tarzan: The Lost Adventure	Tarzan series Tarzan: The Epic Adventures	Succeeded by The Dark Heart of Time

Preceded by Tarzán; 1991–1994	Tarzan: The Epic Adventures; Tarzan: The Epic Adventures; 1996–1997	Succeeded by The Legend of Tarzan; 2001–2002
