= Tarzan: The Lost Adventure =

1995 novel credited to Edgar Rice Burroughs and Joe R. Lansdale

- Dust-jacket illustration for Tarzan: The Lost Adventure
- Author: Edgar Rice Burroughs and Joe R. Lansdale
- Language: English
- Series: Tarzan series
- Genre: Adventure
- Publisher: Dark Horse Comics
- Publication date: 1995
- Publication place: United States
- Media type: Print (hardback)
- ISBN: 1-56971-083-X
- Preceded by: Tarzan and the Valley of Gold (1966)
- Followed by: Tarzan: The Epic Adventures (1996)

Tarzan: The Lost Adventure is a novel credited to Edgar Rice Burroughs and American writer Joe R. Lansdale, based on an incomplete fragment of a Tarzan novel, written by Burroughs, which had been left unfinished at his death. The book was serialized in four parts by Dark Horse Comics, before being published as a single volume in 1995.

== Plot ==
Tarzan plays guardian to an expedition seeking the lost city of Ur. He is accompanied by his animal companions Jad-bal-ja, the golden lion, and Nkima, the little monkey. Ur is discovered to be a society revering a giant and supposedly immortal praying mantis, which is used to slay condemned prisoners in the arena. Tarzan speculates that the creature is originally from the underground world of Pellucidar, to which Ur is connected by a system of caverns and passages. Trapped underground at the end of the story, he seeks escape by seeking out the route to Pellucidar himself.

== Summary of the Burroughs Manuscript ==
The original Burroughs manuscript is 83 typed pages, divided into 16 untitled chapters. The manuscript ends before the treasure hunters reach the lost city of Ur. A detailed summary is posted on the Edgar Rice Burroughs Summary Project page for Tarzan: the Lost Adventure (ERB Manuscript).

== Reception ==
The novel received generally favorable reviews at the time of its release. In the 2005 essay "Forty More Years of Adventure" (which is included in the 2005 edition of Master of Adventure: The Worlds of Edgar Rice Burroughs by Richard A. Lupoff), Phillip R. Burger praises Lansdale's prose style in the novel as an "appropriate extension in the evolution of Burroughs' prose" (but asks "Would Burroughs have ever made Tarzan battle a 'croc'?") and welcomes Lansdale's depiction of Tarzan as the "elemental force" and the "vicious 'throw the severed head into the enemy's camp' ape-man" of the earlier Burroughs Tarzan novels.

== Tarzan series ==
The Lost Adventure was followed by several further novels by other writers authorized by Edgar Rice Burroughs, Inc.

Preceded by Tarzan and the Valley of Gold	Tarzan series Tarzan: The Lost Adventure	Succeeded by Tarzan: The Epic Adventures
