= Tarzan and the Foreign Legion =

Novel by Edgar Rice Burroughs

- Dust-jacket illustration by John Coleman Burroughs for Tarzan and the Foreign Legion
- Author: Edgar Rice Burroughs
- Illustrator: John Coleman Burroughs
- Cover artist: John Coleman Burroughs
- Language: English
- Series: Tarzan series
- Genre: Adventure
- Publisher: Edgar Rice Burroughs, Inc.
- Publication date: 1947
- Publication place: United States
- Media type: Print (hardback)
- Pages: 314
- Preceded by: Tarzan the Magnificent
- Followed by: Tarzan and the Madman

Tarzan and the Foreign Legion is a novel by American writer Edgar Rice Burroughs, the twenty-second in his series of twenty-four books about the title character Tarzan. The book, written June–September 1944 while Burroughs was living in Honolulu and published in 1947, was the last new work by Burroughs to be published during his life (Llana of Gathol, the tenth book in the Barsoom series, was published in 1948, but it was a collection of four stories originally published in Amazing Stories in 1941). The novel is set during World War II in Sumatra, Dutch East Indies. The term "foreign legion" does not refer to the French Foreign Legion, but is the name given in the book to a small international force (including Tarzan) fighting the Empire of Japan.

The book was offered to Argosy magazine, in 1945, for serial publication, as per every Tarzan story previously, but the story was rejected by them and returned. Burroughs published it himself, almost two years later.

== Plot summary ==
While serving in the Royal Air Force under his civilian name of John Clayton, Tarzan is shot down over the island of Sumatra in the Japanese-occupied Dutch East Indies. He uses his jungle survival skills to save his comrades-in-arms, and they fight the Japanese while seeking escape from enemy territory.

Tarzan also reveals to his companions how in his youth, after saving the life of a witch doctor, he was rewarded by treatment that gave him perpetual youth. His companions ask if he is also immortal and he says no. According to Tarzan Alive, Philip José Farmer's study of the ape man's life and career, the incident related with the witch doctor occurred in January 1912.

== Adaptations ==
The book has been adapted into comic form by Gold Key Comics in Tarzan nos. 192–193, dated June and July 1970.

Preceded by Tarzan the Magnificent	Tarzan series Tarzan and the Foreign Legion	Succeeded by Tarzan and the Madman
