= Tarzan's Quest =

1936 novel by Edgar Rice Burroughs

- Dust-jacket illustration of Tarzan's Quest
- Author: Edgar Rice Burroughs
- Illustrator: J. Allen St. John
- Language: English
- Series: Tarzan series
- Genre: Adventure
- Publisher: Edgar Rice Burroughs, Inc.
- Publication date: 1935–1936
- Publication place: United States
- Media type: Print (hardback)
- Pages: 318
- Preceded by: Tarzan and the Leopard Men
- Followed by: Tarzan and the Forbidden City

Tarzan's Quest is a novel by American writer Edgar Rice Burroughs, the nineteenth in his series of twenty-four books about the title character Tarzan. Originally serialized in six parts, as Tarzan and the Immortal Men, in The Blue Book Magazine, from October 1935 to March 1936; the first collected edition was published as the 1936 novel Tarzan’s Quest by Burroughs’ own publishing company.

== Plot ==
Tarzan's wife Jane (her first appearance since Tarzan and the Ant Men and also her last as a major character in the series), becomes involved in a search for a bloodthirsty lost tribe reputed to possess an immortality drug. Also drawn in are Tarzan and his monkey companion, little Nkima, as well as Chief Muviro and his faithful Waziri warriors, who are searching for Muviro's lost daughter Buira. Nkima's vital contribution to the adventure is recognized when he is made a recipient of the immortality treatment along with the human protagonists at the end of the novel.

== Comic adaptations ==
The book has been adapted into comic form by Gold Key Comics in Tarzan nos. 188–189, dated October–December 1969.

Preceded by Tarzan and the Leopard Men	Tarzan series Tarzan's Quest	Succeeded by Tarzan and the Forbidden City
