= The Son of Tarzan =

1915 novel by Edgar Rice Burroughs

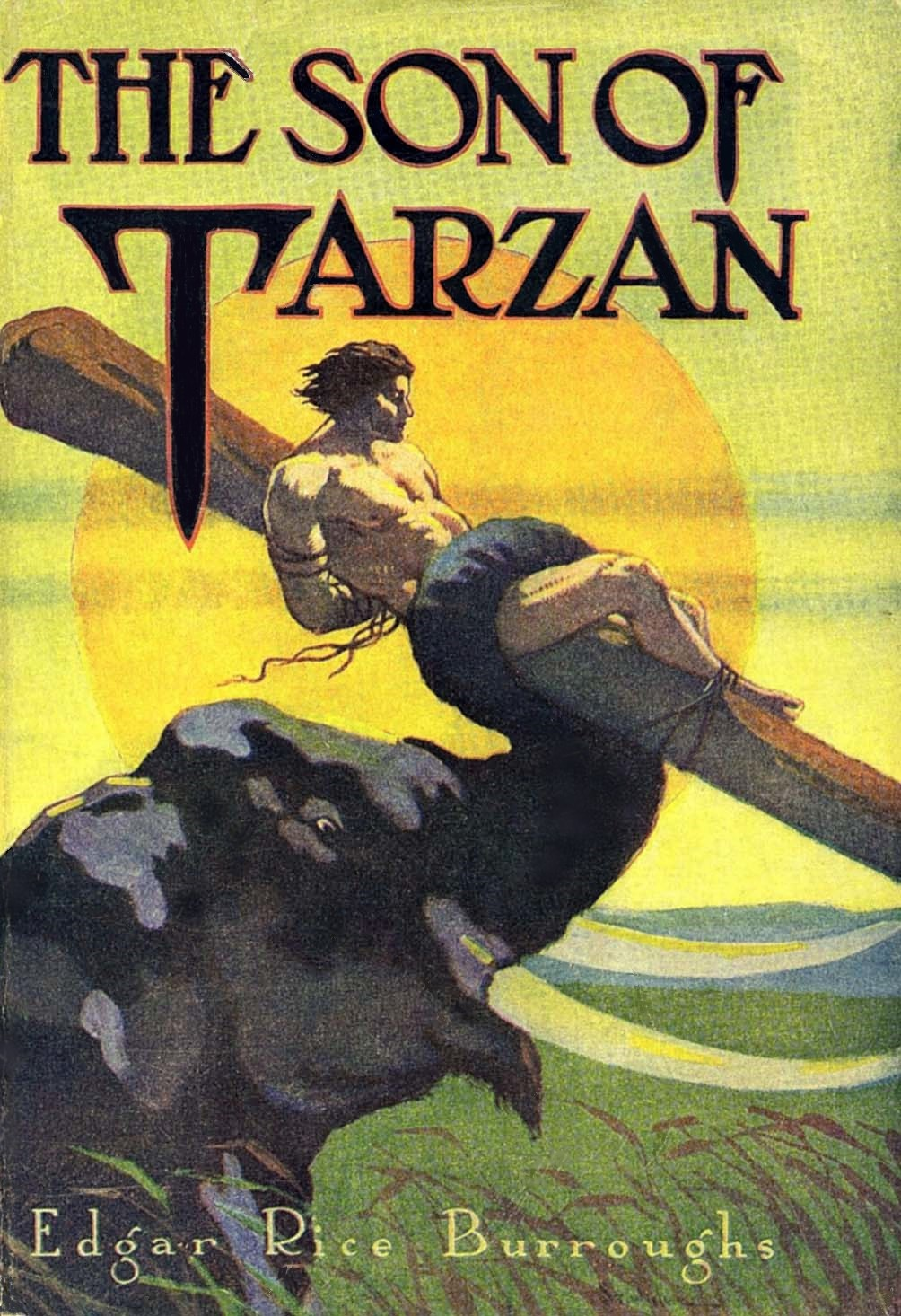
- Dust-jacket illustration of The Son of Tarzan
- Author: Edgar Rice Burroughs
- Illustrator: J. Allen St. John
- Language: English
- Series: Tarzan series
- Genre: Adventure
- Publisher: A. C. McClurg
- Publication date: 1915-1916
- Publication place: United States
- Media type: Print (hardback)
- Pages: 394
- Preceded by: The Beasts of Tarzan
- Followed by: Tarzan and the Jewels of Opar
- Text: The Son of Tarzan at Wikisource

The Son of Tarzan is an adventure novel by American writer Edgar Rice Burroughs, the fourth in his series of twenty-four books about the title character Tarzan. It was written between January 21 and May 11, 1915, and first published in the magazine All-Story Weekly as a six-part serial from December 4, 1915, to January 8, 1916. The story was first published in book form by A. C. McClurg & Co. in March 1917 and has been reprinted numerous times since by various publishers.

== Plot summary ==
In this novel, for the first and only time in the Tarzan series, the main character is not Tarzan himself but his son Jack, who becomes known as Korak, first introduced (as a baby) in the earlier novels The Eternal Lover (1914/15) and The Beasts of Tarzan (1914). Korak would return as a supporting character in the later novels Tarzan the Terrible (1921), Tarzan and the Golden Lion (1922/23) and Tarzan and the Ant Men (1924).

The story begins ten years after the conclusion of The Beasts of Tarzan. During the past decade, Alexis Paulvitch, who escaped Tarzan at the end of the last novel, has lived a hideous life of abuse and disease among tribal people in Africa. A European ship finds and brings him aboard. In the months that follow, Paulvitch encounters the ape Akut (whom Tarzan had befriended in the previous story) at one of the ship's stops. Because of Akut's interactions with Tarzan, he is unafraid of white men, and Paulvitch, unaware of the previous relationship, convinces the ape to come with him to England, where he is seized and exhibited against his will for profit.

After the trauma of the kidnappings ten years earlier, Jane has refused to speak of her husband's past and fears that Jack is close to following in his footsteps; despite being raised in comfort and wealth, Jack prefers the wilds, possesses an avid interest in wildlife, and is extremely athletic. When the Claytons hear about the captive ape, they forbid Jack from going to see it, but he sneaks off and does so anyway. John Clayton follows his son, is surprised to find the ape is his old friend Akut, and begins conversing with him. Jack is amazed to see that his father can do so. John then tells Jack of his life as Tarzan.

After learning the ape language from Akut, Jack attempts to purchase his freedom from Paulvitch. Seeing a chance for revenge on his old enemy, the Russian feigns agreement and takes both of them to a nearby port, whereupon he tries to murder Jack. Akut kills Paulvitch, and Jack, terrified, escapes into the jungle with him, thinking he will have to run for the rest of his life.

Like Tarzan before him, Jack learns survival in the jungle and encounters the Mangani apes, with whom he can speak because of his dialogue with Akut. Due to the latter's difficultly pronouncing the word "Jack", he instead names him "Korak" (killer in ape-tongue). Earning a place among the apes, Korak rescues the orphan girl Meriem. He begins teaching her to survive the jungle and they begin a sibling-esque relationship (though romantic feelings later emerge) and live adventurously for several years.

In the interim, John and Jane move to their Waziri estate in Africa and spend the next six years hoping to reunite with their son. After about six years, the now teenaged Korak and Meriem emerge from the jungle, and Korak chooses to return to England with his parents. The story ends with his marriage to Meriem.

== Adaptations ==
Burroughs' novel was the basis of the fifteen part silent film serial of the same title, the first part of which was released in 1920.

The book has been adapted into comic form by Gold Key Comics in Tarzan no. 158, dated March 1967, with a script by Gaylord DuBois and art by Russ Manning. DC Comics also began an adaptation in its Korak comic, but adapted only the initial portion of the story, using it as the springboard for original stories featuring Korak's quest for a kidnapped Meriem. The comic book magazine Korak, Son of Tarzan, generally focusing on other adventures of the protagonist, was issued from 1963 to 1975 by both publishers in succession, nos. 1-45 (cover dated Jan. 1964-Jan. 1972) by Gold Key and nos. 46-59 (cover dated May/Jun. 1972-Sep./Oct. 1975) by DC. The title of the magazine was then changed to The Tarzan Family, and continued publication under that title by DC from 1975 to 1976 (nos. 60–66, cover dated Nov./Dec. 1975-Nov./Dec. 1976).

| Preceded by The Beasts of Tarzan | Tarzan series The Son of Tarzan | Succeeded by Tarzan and the Jewels of Opar |
