= Karla Schramm =

American actress (1891–1980)

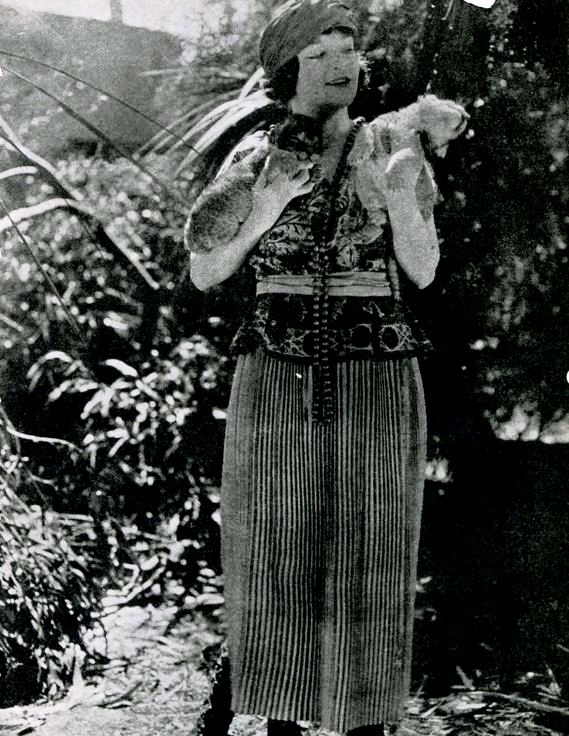
- Schramm in still for The Son of Tarzan (1920)
- Born: February 1, 1891; Los Angeles, California, US
- Died: January 17, 1980 (aged 88); Los Angeles, California, US
- Occupation: Actress

Karla Schramm (February 1, 1891 – January 17, 1980), was an American film actress. A lifelong resident of Los Angeles, California, she was the second actress to play Jane Porter, mate of Tarzan, in motion pictures.

She first appeared in the 1920 production The Revenge of Tarzan opposite Gene Pollar as Tarzan. Later that year she played the same role in the movie serial The Son of Tarzan, this time opposite P. Dempsey Tabler as the Apeman.

She and Brenda Joyce were the only women to play Jane opposite two different Tarzans.

== Filmography ==
- His Majesty, the American (1919) (uncredited)
- The Revenge of Tarzan (1920) - Jane Porter
- The Son of Tarzan (1920) - Jane Porter
