= Meriem (Tarzan) =

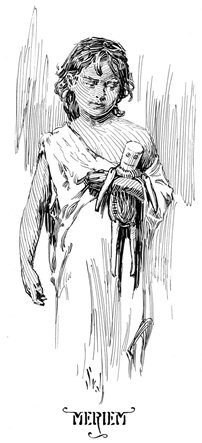
- J. Allen St. John illustration from The Son of Tarzan (1st ed., 1917), depicting Meriem
- First appearance: The Son of Tarzan
- Portrayed by: Mae Giraci; Manilla Martan

In-universe information
- Alias: Jeanne Jacot
- Gender: Female
- Title: Princess
- Family: Armand Jacot (father)
- Spouse: Korak (husband)
- Children: Jackie (son)
- Relatives: Tarzan (father in law); Jane (mother in law)
- Nationality: French

Meriem is a character in Edgar Rice Burroughs's series of Tarzan novels, and the heroine of the fourth, The Son of Tarzan.

== History ==
Born Jeanne Jacot, the daughter of French general Armand Jacot, Meriem is taken captive by Arabs as a child; they give her the name by which she is subsequently known. She is later rescued from her captors by Korak, the son of Tarzan, with whom she afterwards lives in the jungle. She is beautiful, strong, athletic, brave, daring and sensitive. She will kill for survival instead of sport. The emerging relationship between the two feral teenagers is described sensitively, as the embittered boy and the abused girl learn to live and love together, saving each other from various dangers and drawing to the happy ending in which Meriem marries Korak and is reunited with her father who reveals that she is a "princess in her own right".

Meriem is an example of the "Jungle Girl" archetype, in that she lives in the forest, dressed in skins and scavenging for food, with Korak as her guide and protector. Unlike others of the type, she has a past (she is a kidnap victim) and a future—as the wife of a junior English aristocrat and heir to an African chieftaincy. The tenth Tarzan book, Tarzan and the Ant Men, introduces her young son, Jackie.

== In Other Media ==
In the 1920 serial The Son of Tarzan, Meriem was portrayed by Mae Giraci as a girl, and by Nita Martan as a woman.

The character has also appeared in the Tarzan newspaper strip and in comic books featuring Korak.
