= The Revenge of Tarzan =

1920 film by George M. Merrick, Harry Revier

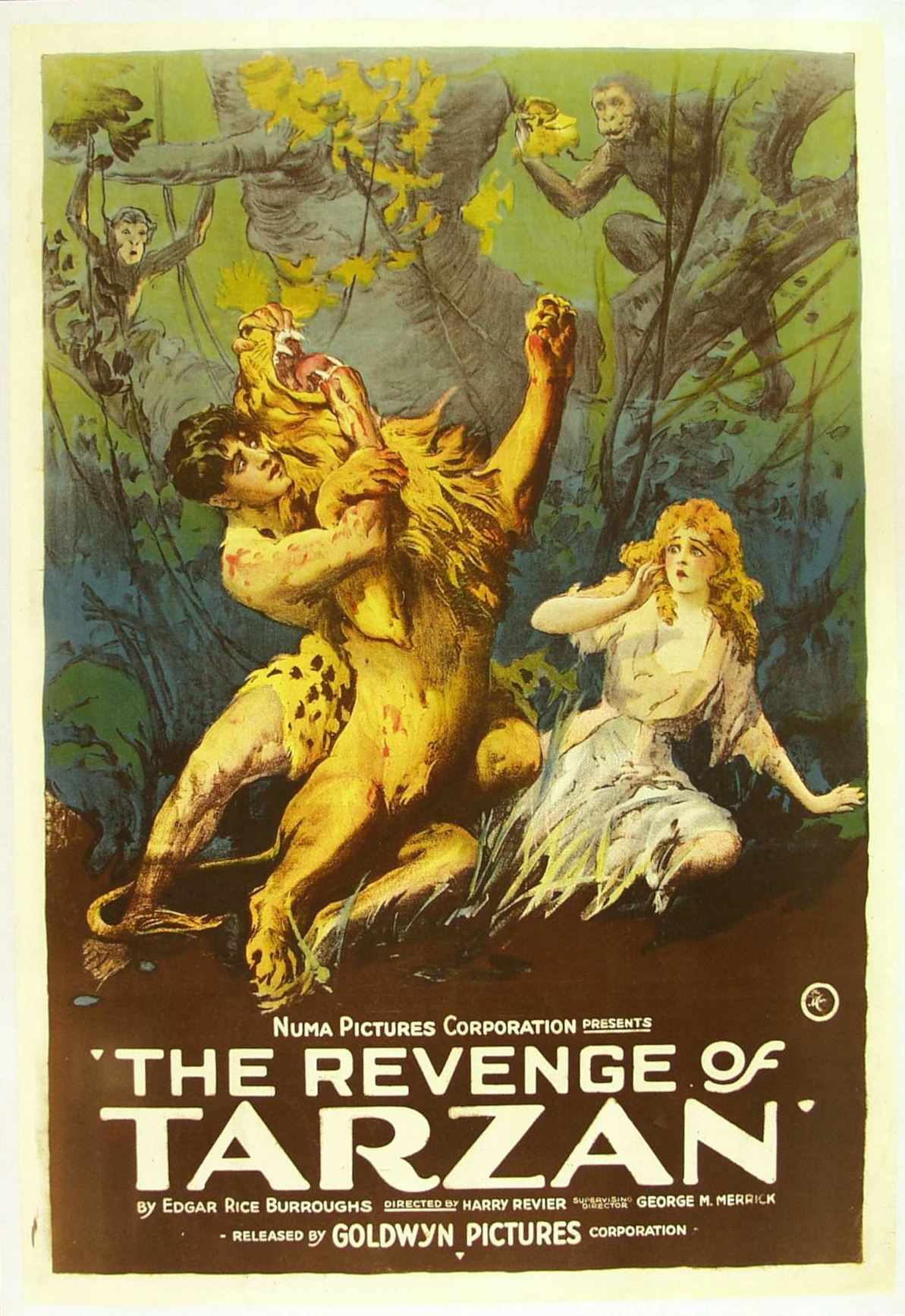
- Movie poster
- Directed by: Harry Revier; George M. Merrick
- Written by: Robert Saxmar
- Based on: The Return of Tarzan by Edgar Rice Burroughs
- Produced by: Samuel Goldwyn; Edgar Rice Burroughs
- Starring: Gene Pollar; Karla Schramm; Estelle Taylor; Armand Cortes; Franklin B. Coates
- Production company: Numa Pictures Corporation
- Distributed by: Goldwyn Pictures
- Release date: May 30, 1920
- Running time: 90 minutes
- Country: United States
- Language: Silent (English intertitles)

The Revenge of Tarzan (1920) is an American silent adventure film, originally advertised as The Return of Tarzan, and the third Tarzan film produced. The film was produced by the Great Western Film Producing Company, a subsidiary of the Numa Pictures Corporation. The film was sold to Goldwyn Pictures for distribution.

The film was written by Robert Saxmar, based on the 1915 novel The Return of Tarzan by Edgar Rice Burroughs, and directed by Harry Revier and George M. Merrick. It was released on May 30, 1920.

== Plot ==
Tarzan and Jane are traveling to Paris to help his old friend Countess de Coude, who is being threatened by her brother, Nikolas Rokoff. Rokoff has Tarzan tossed overboard. He survives, comes ashore in North Africa, and goes to Paris to search for Jane.

In Paris, Tarzan reunites with his old friend Paul D'Arnot, who informs him that Jane was taken to Africa.

Tarzan returns just in time to save Jane from a lion attack, and soon defeats Rokoff and his henchmen.

== Cast ==
- Gene Pollar as Tarzan
- Karla Schramm as Jane
- Estelle Taylor as Countess de Coude, Tarzan's ally
- Armand Cortes as Nikolas Rokoff, a villain
- Franklin B. Coates as Paul D'Arnot, Tarzan's old friend
- George Romain as Count de Coude
- Walter Miller as Henchman to Rokoff
- Louis Stern as Polawitch
- Betty Turner as Marie
- Joe Martin (orangutan)

== Production notes ==
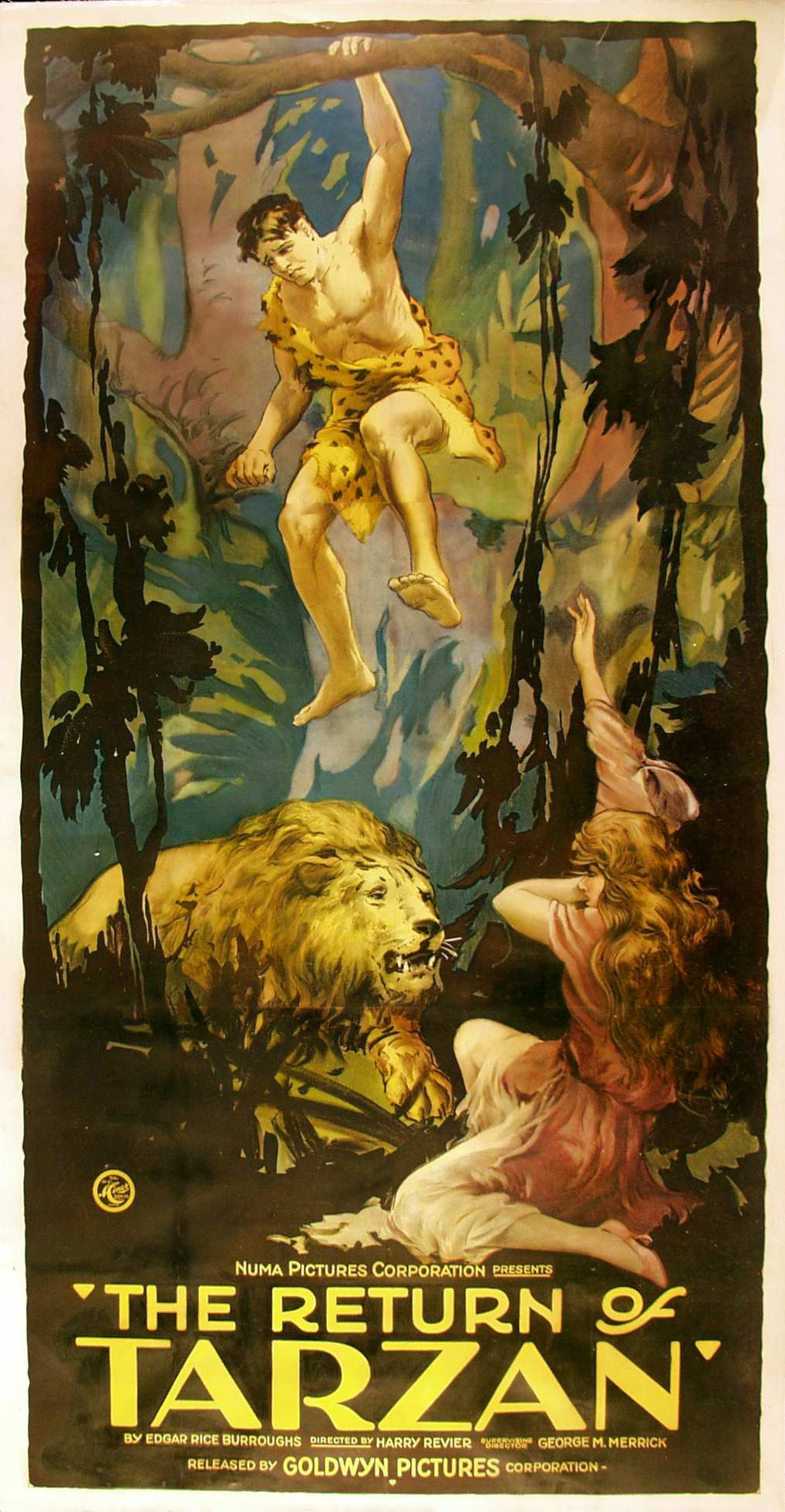
Poster with the original title

The production filmed on location in New York, Florida, and Balboa, California.

Karla Schramm returned to portray Jane in The Son of Tarzan (opposite P. Dempsey Tabler as Tarzan), also released in 1920. She and Brenda Joyce are the only two actresses who have portrayed Jane opposite two different Tarzans.

Gene Pollar, a former firefighter, made no other films, and returned to his old job after the film was completed.

Outside the United States, the film is known by its working title, The Return of Tarzan. The title was changed for its American release in July 1920. A previously known print was destroyed in the 1965 MGM vault fire. While usually reported as a lost film, a complete print exists under the title The Return of Tarzan in the BFI/National Film And Television Archive in London, England. Preservation status of the print is unknown.

== Bibliography ==
- Essoe, Gabe. Tarzan of the Movies (Citadel Press, 1968)
