= Tarzan, Lord of the Jungle (novel) =

Novel by Edgar Rice Burroughs

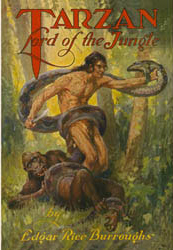
- Dust-jacket illustration of Tarzan, Lord of the Jungle
- Author: Edgar Rice Burroughs
- Illustrator: J. Allen St. John
- Language: English
- Series: Tarzan series
- Genre: Adventure
- Publisher: A. C. McClurg
- Publication date: 1927-1928
- Publication place: United States
- Media type: Print (hardback)
- Pages: 377 pp
- Preceded by: Tarzan and the Tarzan Twins
- Followed by: Tarzan and the Lost Empire
- Text: Tarzan, Lord of the Jungle at Wikisource

Tarzan, Lord of the Jungle is a novel by American writer Edgar Rice Burroughs, generally considered the eleventh in his series of twenty-four books about the title character Tarzan (the previous book, Tarzan and the Tarzan Twins, being omitted from the enumeration on the grounds that it was written for younger readers). The story was first published as a serial in Blue Book Magazine from December 1927 through May 1928; it first appeared in book form in a hardcover edition from A. C. McClurg in September 1928.

== Plot summary ==
Tarzan finds an outpost of European knights and crusaders from a "forbidden valley" hidden in the mountains, whose ancestors had gone astray en route to the Holy Land and ended up in the depth of Africa. They still maintain a medieval European way of life in the 20th century and have split into two mutually-hostile factions. Tarzan's lion ally Jad-bal-ja puts in an appearance late in the book.

== Adaptations ==
The book has been adapted into comic form by Gold Key Comics in Tarzan nos. 176-177, dated August–September 1969, with a script by Gaylord DuBois. Part of the art was based on lay-outs by Russ Manning.

The novel also inspired a very similar plot line in the Filmation animated series, Tarzan, Lord of the Jungle, first season (1976) episode 9, Tarzan and the Knights of Nimmr.

Preceded by Tarzan and the Tarzan Twins	Tarzan series Tarzan, Lord of the Jungle	Succeeded by Tarzan and the Lost Empire
