= Jad-bal-ja =

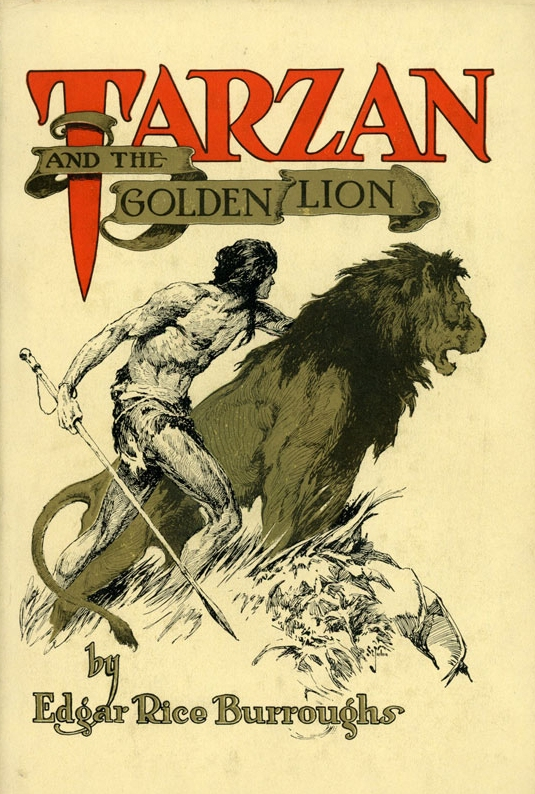
- Dust-jacket illustration of Tarzan and the Golden Lion showing Jad-bal-ja
- First appearance: Tarzan and the Golden Lion
- Created by: Edgar Rice Burroughs

In-universe information
- Species: Lion
- Gender: Male

Jad-bal-ja, the Golden Lion is a fictional character in Edgar Rice Burroughs's Tarzan novels, and in adaptations of the saga to other media, particularly comics.

== Character ==
Jad-bal-ja serves as a companion to Tarzan, to whom he is attached as a dog is to its master, sometimes hunting for him and at other times fighting by his side, rescuing him from peril, or protecting his friends or allies from danger. He is portrayed as especially close to Nkima, the monkey who served as Tarzan's other primary animal companion.

== In the Tarzan novels ==
Jad-bal-ja first appears in the ninth Tarzan novel, Tarzan and the Golden Lion (1922 serial, 1923 novel), in which the ape-man discovers him as an orphaned cub and raises and trains him. He is named for the color of his coat, Jad-bal-ja meaning "the golden lion" in the language of Pal-ul-don, a prehistoric lost land visited by Tarzan in the previous novel, Tarzan the Terrible (1921).

Jad-bal-ja goes on to play a prominent part in the novel in which he is introduced, and re-appears in the tenth Tarzan novel (1924's Tarzan and the Ant Men); the eleventh (1927's Tarzan, Lord of the Jungle); the fourteenth (1930's Tarzan the Invincible); the sixteenth (1932's Tarzan and the City of Gold, in which he saves Tarzan from certain death at the jaws of another lion); the seventeenth (1938's Tarzan and the Lion Man, in which he finds a mate); and the twenty-sixth (1995's Tarzan: the Lost Adventure). Jad-bal-ja is also featured in the 1936 children's story, "Tarzan and the Tarzan Twins, with Jad-bal-ja, the Golden Lion".

== In other media ==
The character of Jad-bal-ja also appears in the Tarzan comic strip and comic books, both in adaptations of the original novels and in stories newly written for the medium. He has had one film appearance, in the 1927 silent movie Tarzan and the Golden Lion, an adaptation of the novel. He also appears as a recurring character in Filmation's animated series Tarzan, Lord of the Jungle (1976–1981).
