= The Son of Tarzan (film) =

1920 film

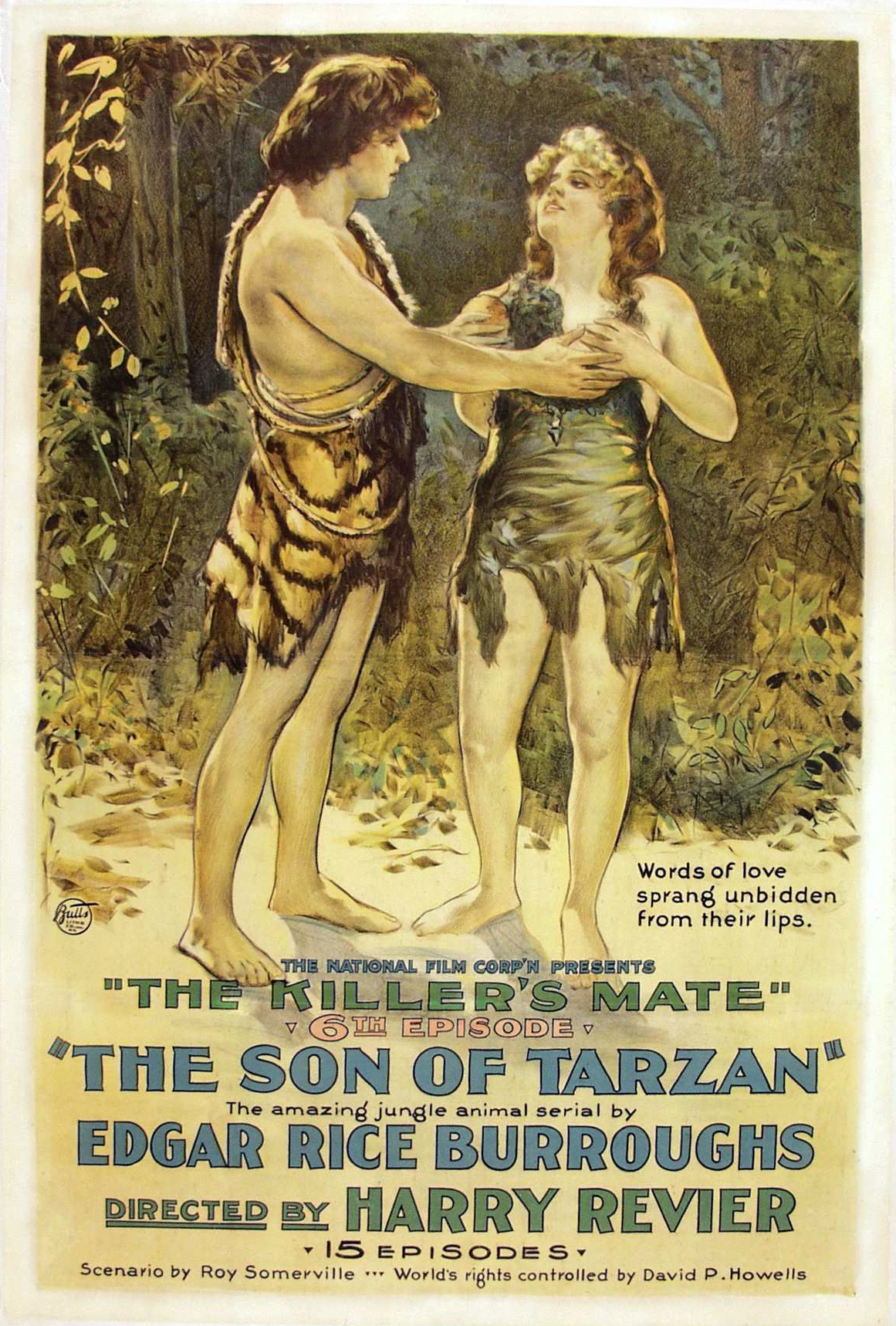
- Film poster
- Directed by: Arthur J. Flaven; Harry Revier
- Written by: Roy Somerville
- Based on: The Son of Tarzan by Edgar Rice Burroughs
- Produced by: David P. Howells
- Starring: Kamuela C. Searle; Manilla Martan; P. Dempsey Tabler; Karla Schramm; Eugene Burr
- Distributed by: National Film Corporation of America
- Release date: May 1920 (first chapter)
- Running time: 253 minutes (15 chapters)
- Language: Silent (English intertitles)
- Budget: Negative cost: $106,000

Full serial

The Son of Tarzan is a 1920 15-chapter American film serial which focuses on the coming of age of Jack Clayton, also known as Korak, the son of Tarzan and Jane. The serial was produced by David P. Howells, written by Roy Somerville (based on the 1915 novel The Son of Tarzan by Edgar Rice Burroughs), and directed by Arthur J. Flaven and Harry Revier. The film was released starting in the summer of 1920, with the final chapter released in January 1921.

== Plot ==
Tarzan and Jane have left Africa, married and settled in London. Their pre-teen son, Jack, dreams of jungle adventures like his father's, but is discouraged by his parents. He sneaks away to see a trained ape called Ajax (in reality, Akut, an old friend from Tarzan's youth). The ape's trainer is really Ivan Paulovich, an old enemy of Tarzan's, who is looking for a way to enact vengeance. He kidnaps Jack and takes him to Africa.

Jack escapes with Akut and survives on his own in the wild much like his father did before him. He is given the Ape name Korak, which means "Killer" in their language. Korak rescues Meriem, a young French girl held captive by Arab slave traders and they grow to adulthood in the jungle. Paulovich hopes to receive a ransom from her wealthy parents for her return as well and attempts to capture both of them.

Eventually Paulovich lures Jane to Africa in order to extort a ransom, but Tarzan soon follows. Tarzan and Jane, living at their African estate, find Meriem and informally adopt her. They discover her parentage and send for her father. The film climaxes with a battle pitting Korak against Paulovich, his henchmen and the slave traders. An elephant rescues Korak, who is bound to a stake and he and Meriem are reunited with their parents, and all sail for England.

== Cast ==
- Kamuela C. Searle as Korak/Jack Clayton, the son of Tarzan (adult)
- Manilla Martan as Meriem, Korak's companion and eventual wife (adult)
- P. Dempsey Tabler as Tarzan
- Karla Schramm as Jane
- Gordon Griffith as Korak/Jack Clayton (child)
- Mae Giraci as Meriem (child)
- Eugene Burr as Ivan Paulovich, a villain seeking revenge on Tarzan
- Frank Morrell as Sheik Amor Ben Khatour
- Ray Thompson as Malbihn
- Saville De Sacia
- Frank Earle
- Kathleen May
- Lucille Rubey

== Production ==
Edgar Rice Burroughs had fallen out with the President of National Film Corporation over the first two Tarzan films. However, following a change in President to Harry M. Rubey, National Film Corporation paid Burroughs $20,000 for the screen rights to his novel The Son of Tarzan. The producer, David P. Howells, decided to abandon the feature film format of the previous Tarzan production in favour of a film serial.

National Film Corporation was unable to cast either of the previous Tarzan actors, Elmo Lincoln or Gene Pollar. As the production was without a star to begin with the early publicity focussed on the serial itself. Howells told the press, "This picture will be an animal serial supreme with a special cast. It is to be no mad jumble of blood and thunder, nor a series of unrelated incidents intended to be mystifying, but will be a consistently constructed dramatic production."

=== Casting ===
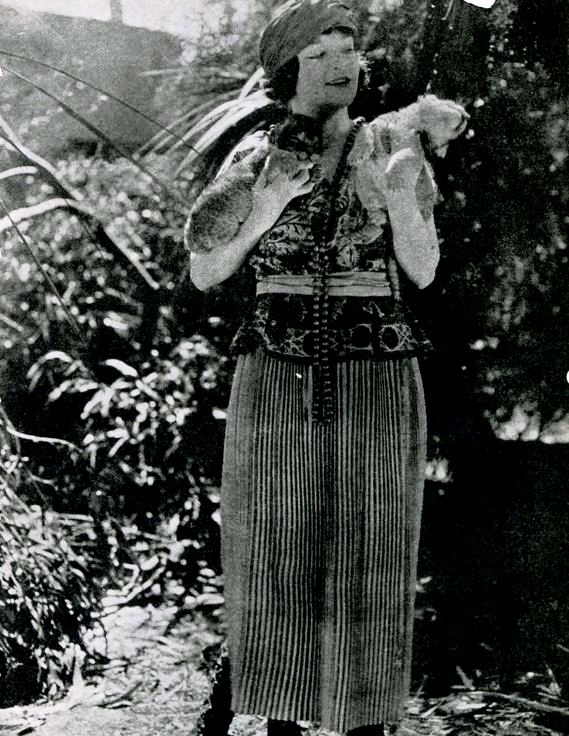
Karla Schramm as Jane

On April 3, 1920, Rubey announced that cowboy actor Jack Hoxie would play the lead as Tarzan's son, Korak. The female lead would be Rubey's wife, Lucille. Harry Revier was hired as the director and the filming would take place on an island in the South Pacific. He even stated that "over 300 apes, orangutans, gorillas and chimpanzees have been contracted for".

Within a month most of these plans had changed. With the backing of Howells and casting director Jean Temple, Revier replaced Lucille Rubey with Kathleen May, only to replace her in turn by Nita Martan (then using the stage name Manilla Martan). Hoxie had never been enthusiastic about the part and soon pulled out. This left the serial without a star again until Revier cast Hawaiian actor Kamuela C. Searle, who had played an important part in Cecil B. DeMille's Male and Female, as Korak. Searle spent four weeks in the desert prior to filming "hardening" himself in preparation for the role.

Mae Giraci was cast as the young Meriem. The role of the young Korak initially went to Kenneth Nordyke but he was replaced by Gordon Griffith, who had played the young Tarzan in Tarzan of the Apes and The Romance of Tarzan. P. Dempsey Tabler, a Tennessee athlete with experience in light opera, was cast as Tarzan. Tabler was in his mid-40s at the time, making him the oldest actor to debut as Tarzan to date. As he was balding, he wore a bad, unconvincing wig for the part. He was not popular as Tarzan and this was his final performance on screen. Karla Schramm was another Tarzan film veteran. With this serial, she reprised her role as Jane from The Revenge of Tarzan.

=== Filming ===
Production started May 15, 1920, with the intention of an autumn release. This timetable could not be kept to and Revier hired an assistant director, Arthur J. Flavin, in June 1920 to speed up production. The fifteenth and final chapter was not finished until January 27, 1921, for a total negative cost of $106,000.

As the audience may not have been aware of the background to the Tarzan story, Revier arranged a pictorial prologue to acquaint them with the basics. This played at the start of the first chapter and the idea was extended to replace the written opening synopsis of the story so far in each subsequent chapter. This was the first serial to do so and pictorial retelling of earlier chapters became a common feature of later serials. The prologue makes this serial notable as it contains the first on-screen wedding of Tarzan and Jane.

The serial was actually filmed in the San Bernardino Mountains, on the river bottom at Pico Rivera (in what is now the Woodland Park area), and along the coasts of Los Angeles (Corona del Mar) and San Francisco. As a pre-Hays Code production, the film shows Manilla Martan bathing nude, and several shots show her breasts pop out of her skimpy costume during fight and chase scenes.

While filming the fifteenth chapter an accident occurred on set involving Searle and the elephant playing Tantor. Searle had been tied to a stake and, following a Tarzan Yell, Tantor was supposed to come to his rescue, pull the stake out of the ground and place Searle down again. Instead of placing him gently on the ground, however, the elephant thrust him down so hard it shattered the stake. According to Essoe, Harmon & Glut, Searle died from his injuries and the serial was completed by a double. However, Searle's brother later stated that though Searle was hurt enough that a double did stand in for him in a few final long shots, he survived the mishap, only to die of cancer in 1924.

The accident was played down but proved to be a big draw with the movie going public. Regardless, the serial was being released while it was shot, rather than being completed and then released, so publicity from the event helped the serial, as the audience wished to see the "death scene". Further injury occurred when Tabler broke several ribs in a fight scene with Eugene Burr (playing Ivan Paulovich).

The song "Tarzan, my Jungle King" was written for the serial.

== Critical reception ==
Critics enjoyed the film but were divided in the extent of their praise. The Exhibitors Herald declared it the "best serial of all time. Should have been twenty episodes or more instead of fifteen. Will be the greatest moneymaker over the Christmas holidays." However, the Motion Picture Magazine said "Even tho' good entertainment, The Son of Tarzan could have been much improved with name actors." The success of this Tarzan serial inspired the subsequent The Adventures of Tarzan.

== Chapter titles ==
1. "The Call of the Jungle"
2. "Out of the Lion's Jaws"
3. "Girl of the Jungle"
4. "The Sheik's Revenge"
5. "The Pirate's Prey"
6. "The Killer's Mate"
7. "The Quest of the Killer"
8. "The Coming of Tarzan"
9. "The Kiss of the Beast"
10. "Tarzan Takes the Trail"
11. "Ashes of Love"
12. "Meriem's Ride in the Night"
13. "Double-Cross"
14. "Blazing Hearts"
15. "The Amazing Denouement"
