= Tarzan and the Golden Lion =

Novel by Edgar Rice Burroughs

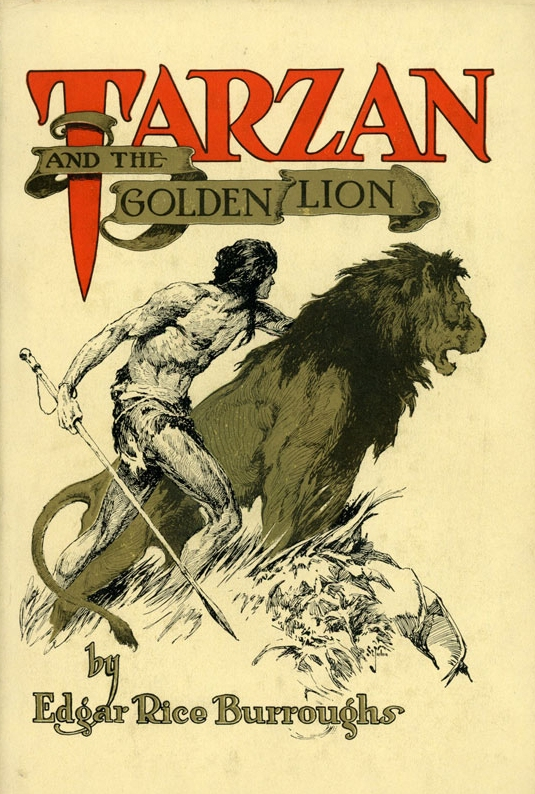
- Dust-jacket illustration of Tarzan and the Golden Lion
- Author: Edgar Rice Burroughs
- Illustrator: J. Allen St. John
- Language: English
- Series: Tarzan series
- Genre: Adventure
- Publisher: A. C. McClurg
- Publication date: 1922-1923
- Publication place: United States
- Media type: Print (hardback)
- Pages: 333
- Preceded by: Tarzan the Terrible
- Followed by: Tarzan and the Ant Men
- Text: Tarzan and the Golden Lion at Wikisource

Tarzan and the Golden Lion is an adventure novel by American writer Edgar Rice Burroughs, the ninth in his series of twenty-four books about the title character Tarzan. The story was first published as a seven part serial in Argosy All-Story Weekly beginning in December 1922; and then as a complete novel by A.C. McClurg & Co. on March 24, 1923.

== Plot summary ==
The story picks up with the Clayton family: Tarzan, Jane Porter and their son Korak, returning from their adventures in the previous novel (#8). Along the way, they find an orphaned lion cub, which Tarzan takes home and trains.

Flora Hawkes, a previous housemaid of the Claytons, has overheard of Tarzan's discovery of the treasure chamber in the lost city of Opar (from The Return of Tarzan and Tarzan and the Jewels of Opar) and has managed to copy his map to it. She concocts a plan to lead an expedition to collect the gold. As a contingency to discourage any local denizens from questioning them, she seeks out and finds a Tarzan look-alike named Esteban Miranda to accompany them.

Two years pass since the Clayton family adopted their lion cub, making the year around 1935 and Tarzan is about 47 years old. His Greystoke estate has become so financially depleted due to his support of the Allies war efforts, and he concludes it was time to return to Opar for another withdrawal.

Tarzan encounters Hawkes' party, where he is drugged and ends up in the hands of the Oparians. Queen La, who has come into disfavor with the high priest, feels she has nothing to lose by escaping with Tarzan through the only unguarded route — a path to the legendary valley of diamonds, from which no one has ever returned. There, Tarzan finds a race of humans who are little better than animals in intelligence, being enslaved by a race of intelligent gorillas. With the help of his golden lion Jad-bal-ja, Tarzan uses the natives to restore La to power. Before leaving, he accepts a bag of diamonds as a reward.

Meanwhile, Esteban Miranda convinces Tarzan's Waziri party to take the gold from Hawkes' party while most of them are out hunting. He then buries the gold so he can retain it later. The real Tarzan eventually confronts the imposter, who still manages to pilfer Tarzan's bag of diamonds. Miranda is then chased by Jad-bal-ja, but he escapes into a river, before finding himself later captured and permanently imprisoned by a local tribe. Tarzan loses the diamonds, but he's still able to attain the gold and return with it.

== Film adaptations ==
The novel was made into a motion picture in 1927.

== Comic adaptations ==
Tarzan and the Golden Lion has been adapted into comic form by Gold Key Comics in Tarzan nos. 172-173, dated April–May 1969, with a script by Gaylord DuBois and art by Russ Manning.

The book was the basis for an episode of Filmation's animated Tarzan, Lord of the Jungle series. Here, the intelligent gorillas are depicted as a race of gorilla men called the "Bolmangani", where they imprison a race of monkey people and many other animals, but they fight along Tarzan.

Preceded by Tarzan the Terrible	Tarzan series Tarzan and the Golden Lion	Succeeded by Tarzan and the Ant Men
