= The Royal American =

1927 film

- Directed by: Harry Joe Brown
- Written by: George W. Pyper
- Produced by: Harry Joe Brown
- Starring: Reed Howes; Nita Martan; Billy Franey
- Cinematography: Ross Fisher
- Production company: Harry J. Brown Productions
- Distributed by: Rayart Pictures
- Release date: July 1927
- Running time: 50 minutes
- Country: United States
- Languages: Silent; English intertitles

The Royal American is a 1927 American silent action adventure film directed by Harry Joe Brown and starring Reed Howes, Nita Martan and Billy Franey. Produced by Brown's own production company, it was distributed by the independent Rayart Pictures, the forerunner of Monogram Pictures.

== Plot ==
A young coast guard officer becomes involved with an altercation with the crew of a ship and finds himself shanghaied aboard. The ship turns out to be gunrunning armaments to South American revolutionaries. The young officer wins control over the ship, subsequently turning it over to his commander.

== Cast ==
- Reed Howes as Jack Beaton
- Nita Martan as Gail Morton
- Billy Franey as Mike
- David Kirby as Pat
- J.P. McGowan as Capt. Burke
- Hal Salter as First Mate Dorgan
- Rosa Gore as Mother Meg

== Bibliography ==
- Connelly, Robert B. The Silents: Silent Feature Films, 1910-36, Volume 40, Issue 2. December Press, 1998.
- Munden, Kenneth White. The American Film Institute Catalog of Motion Pictures Produced in the United States, Part 1. University of California Press, 1997.
