= J. T. Edson =

English author (1928–2014)

- Born: 17 February 1928; Whitwell, Derbyshire, England
- Died: 17 July 2014 (aged 86); Melton Mowbray, Leicestershire
- Spouse: Dorothy
- Children: 6 (3 adopted)
- Writing career
- Language: English
- Years active: 1947–2005
- Genres: Western; adventure; police procedural
- Notable work: Floating Outfit series
- Military career
- Allegiance: UK
- Branch: Army
- Service years: 1946–1958
- Conflicts: British Malaya; Kenya

John Thomas Edson (17 February 1928 – 17 July 2014) was an English author of 137 Westerns, escapism adventure, and police-procedural novels. He lived near Melton Mowbray, Leicestershire, from the 1950s onwards, and retired from writing due to ill-health in 2005.

== Biography ==
He was born in February 1928 near the border of Derbyshire in a small mining village, Whitwell. Both his grandfathers and assorted uncles were coalminers His paternal family was native to Whitwell, his paternal grandfather Herbert Edson, being born in the hamlet of Steetley, near Whitwell. His maternal grandfather, Robert Gill, was born in Heeley, Yorkshire.

His parents married at Whitwell Parish Church of St. Lawrence on 5 April 1926, and John Thomas (J.T.) Edson (junior) was their first child. In June 1928 the Edson family suffered a sudden bereavement when 7-year-old John Vincent Edson, the young son of John Edson's namesake cousin John R Edson, died suddenly; a month later, John Thomas Edson himself also died in July 1928, leaving Eliza a 23-year-old widow with a six-month-old baby son. Eliza Edson remarried in 1946 when J.T. Edson was 18 years old.

J. T. Edson joined the British Army at the age of 18 years in 1946. Edson served in the army for 12 years as a Dog Trainer. He saw active service in Korea and Africa.

Cooped up in barracks for long periods, he read books by escapist writers such as Edgar Rice Burroughs, Robert McCraig, Nelson C. Nye and Edgar Wallace. He also watched films starring John Wayne, Randolph Scott, Errol Flynn and his all-time favourite, Audie Murphy. His first published work was "Hints on Self-Preservation when attacked by a War Dog" in the Osnabrück camp magazine Shufti in 1947. Acquiring a typewriter in the early 1950s and putting it to good use while posted to Hong Kong, by the time of his discharge he had written 10 Westerns, an early version of Bunduki and the first of the short detective-type stories starring Waco.

Edson decided to leave the Army on his marriage and as he and his wife began to raise their six children, he sought to turn his hobby of writing into an income to support his family. He won second prize (with Trail Boss, first published in 1961) in the Western division of a literary competition run by Brown & Watson Ltd, which led to the publication of 46 novels with them, becoming a major source of revenue for the company. He sometimes needed additional income and also worked as a postman, and was the proprietor of a fish and chip shop. He branched out as a writer and wrote five series of short stories (Dan Hollick, Dog Handler) for the Victor boys' paper, and wrote the box captions for comic strips, which instilled discipline and the ability to convey maximum information with minimum words.

His writing career forged ahead when he joined Corgi Books in the late 1960s, which gave Edson exposure through a major publishing house, as well as the opportunity to branch out from Westerns into the Rockabye County, the science-fiction hero Bunduki and other series.

At his most prolific, Edson wrote a new novel every six to eight weeks.

== Later life ==
Edson openly claimed, though rather tongue-in-cheek, that he wrote for the money. In an article for Time magazine in February 1999, he declared that unlike such authors as Louis L'Amour, he had "no desire to have lived in the Wild West, and I've never even been on a horse. I've seen those things and they look highly dangerous at both ends and bloody uncomfortable in the middle."

This remoteness from the West placed Edson in company with the popular Western author Zane Grey, who was a middle-aged east coast dentist. Similarly, Western author George G. Gilman, real name Terry Harknett, was born and bred in Essex, England.

Summary
Event	Timespan
Ole Devil	1835–1837
Civil War	1861–1865
Floating Outfit	1866 – early 1880s
Waco series	late 1870s – late 1890s
Calamity Jane	Late 1860s – c.1880
Waxahachie Smith	1880s – 1890s
Alvin Fog	c.1918 – c. late 1920s
Rockabye County	1960s – 1970s
Bunduki	1960s – 1970s

== His style ==
J. T. Edson delighted in using real-life and fictional characters as crossover "guest stars" in his works and often used the relatives/descendants of his characters to create spin-off series. He backs the existence of these guest stars with frequent references to "fictionist-genealogist" Philip José Farmer's Wold Newton family.

His first hero, Ole Devil, is the maternal uncle of his Civil War & Floating Outfit hero, Dusty Fog. Fog in turn is the first cousin of gunfighter John Wesley Hardin. Lon Ysabel's cousin is "Bad Bill" Longley. Alvin Fog was Dusty's grandson; Rockabye County hero Bradford Counter was Mark Counter's great-grandson, and Bunduki was Bradford Counter's cousin and another great-grandson of Mark Counter, his mater Dawn Drummond-Clayton being the great-granddaughter of Tarzan through their son, Jack Clayton, aka Korak the Killer. Alvin Fog shares his series with Edgar Wallace characters J G Reeder and the Three Just Men. A variety of real (Wyatt Earp) and fictional (Matt Dillon) characters pop up in every series.

The huge procession of characters from book to book ensured that the first few pages of an Edson book always ended up looking alike, with descriptions of a small, insignificant looking Dusty Fog, who suddenly appeared to become a giant when villains he faced down felt the full force of his personality, the tall and Greek-god handsome Mark Counter, the baby-faced but highly dangerous, black dressed, rifle and bowie knife toting Ysabel Kid, and various other characters. Western critic Ray Merlock has lauded Edson for his characterisation of these three heroes.

Edson's books avoided explicit sex and graphic violence; they also advocated right-wing political views. Edson also avoiding having "losers" and anti-heroes as protagonists. Merlock stated: "Edson's strength as a Western writer is that he loves his main characters...His villains are stereotyped, his plots usually familiar, but his emphasis on his three, rather pleasant leading characters is the basis for his understandable popularity".

== Regular characters ==
=== Dusty Fog ===
Dusty (Dustine Edward Marsden Fog) is the principal protagonist in most of the Floating Outfit stories and Civil War stories. Short but strongly built for his height, Dusty is exceptionally fast with his twin Colts and commonly considered the fastest gun in Texas, a skilled rifle shot though usually preferring a Winchester carbine as being more suited to his small stature, and unequalled in hand-to-hand combat either unarmed or with a sabre. Dusty adapts his talents to the situation whether as head of a cattle drive (e.g. in Trail Boss), light cavalry commander (e.g. in Kill Dusty Fog!), lawman (e.g. in The Town Tamers), wagon train boss (Wagons to Backsight) or spy (e.g. as assistant to Belle Boyd in The Rebel Spy), and his wide education from a variety of teachers renders him a shrewd solver of mysteries and fraud (one example is given in "A Wife for Dusty Fog" in The Small Texan). Although well able to fight in the normal manner for a Western saloon brawl, Dusty is extensively trained in judo and karate by Tommy Okasi. Dusty is a capable cattleman and knows few equals as a horseman, successfully breaking and later using as his regular mount a paint stallion that crippled Ole Devil when he tried to ride it. In the earlier part of his career Dusty uses twin Model 1860 Army Colts but acquires a pair of Civilian Model P Colts in The Peacemakers, finding them much to his liking and conferring a slight improvement in his draw speed and marksmanship.

=== Mark Counter ===
Mark is Dusty's right-hand man in many Floating Outfit stories and the principal protagonist in a few (e.g. Rangeland Hercules). Much taller and heavier than Dusty (about six feet three inches and 210 pounds), Mark is seldom acknowledged as even having an equal for size and strength, although Dusty may be slightly stronger pound for pound. Rarely some third party is mentioned as having been capable of equalling one of Mark's feats of strength (one instance is in The Fortune Hunters, but was sabotaged and led to the crippling of the other man). Lacking Dusty's knowledge of Oriental martial arts, Mark adopts a more conventional albeit comparatively modern boxing style taught to him by Sailor Sam, who worked as Mark's father's cook, and is only ever beaten when badly outnumbered. Mark is almost as fast with his Colts as is Dusty, preferring Cavalry Peacemakers when these become available as replacements for his earlier Army Colts. Mark is invariably stated to be an even better cattleman than Dusty although deferring to him on cattle drives, and also an expert with either rifle or sabre although he concedes Dusty's superiority with either weapon. Also a shrewd lawman, Mark generally works as Dusty's deputy on such occasions. Since Mark is tall, strong and handsome (and a leader of Confederate Army fashions during the Civil War) Mark is often mistaken for Dusty by those who know the latter only by his very strong reputation, which confusion the Floating Outfit occasionally use to their advantage when it helps for Dusty to remain incognito for a while. Also an exceptional horseman, Mark rides a "huge" bloodbay stallion throughout his career with the Floating Outfit. Mark's good looks and Southern charm bring him many romantic conquests although he is principled enough to steer clear of innocents and is strongly averse to married women.

=== The Ysabel Kid ===
Lon (Loncey Dalton Ysabel; also "Cuchilo", the Knife, among the Comanche; or "Cabrito", literally "little he-goat" and hence a synonym for one meaning of the English word "Kid", to Spanish-speakers) is the third member of the principal triumvirate of the Floating Outfit stories. Half Kentucky Irish, one-quarter French Creole and one-quarter Comanche, Loncey was raised as a member of his grandfather's "Dog Soldier" Lodge and received Comanche training until adolescence. Because of this he is fully the equal of any full-blood Indian in skills such as stealth and tracking, speaks several Indian languages and can communicate in sign language, and is an expert horse-rider and trainer. His personal mount is an exceptionally fierce white stallion named, with deliberate irony, "Nigger" ("Blackie" in some editions) which he trained as a boy. Nigger is unusually well trained, able to warn his master of ambushers, unmatched in speed and endurance, and a proven man-killer that will attack on command. Only close associates are able to handle Nigger and then only to the bare minimum necessary. Less of a revolver-fighter than most of the Floating Outfit, the Kid uses a single Dragoon Colt with some skill but would only be considered fast by those unused to the West; however, he is fond of his obsolescent revolver for its brutal hitting power and when he does shoot someone with it they are usually killed or maimed by a single hit. At close quarters the Kid is second to none with a Bowie knife and at longer ranges he is a phenomenal rifle shot. When encountered in The Ysabel Kid, Loncey is using a carbine-stocked Dragoon Colt faut de mieux as a long gun, his muzzle-loading rifle having recently been destroyed, but later in the story he acquires a brass-framed "Yellow Boy" Winchester 1866 with which he rapidly becomes expert. When this weapon too is destroyed some years later, in Gun Wizard, the Kid succeeds in winning a "One of a Thousand" Winchester 1873 which he finds a still superior weapon. Rarely, the Kid yields the palm to a specialised sharpshooter with a target-sighted rifle (Wagons to Backsight), but otherwise he is as famous for his skill with a rifle as Dusty is with a Colt. Having spent his late adolescence as a smuggler on the US/Mexico border, the Kid has contacts on both sides of the law in Mexico and knows the Spanish spoken by bandits or hidalgos alike.

=== Waco ===
Waco (birth name unknown; so named because as an infant he survived a Waco Indian massacre) becomes the fourth regular member of the Floating Outfit when he encounters Dusty Fog as an angry young man. Being already a fast-draw gunfighter with several kills behind him, Waco picks a fight with Dusty only to find that Dusty can not only beat him to the draw but have enough margin of victory to hold his fire, which he does because of Waco's resemblance to his recently murdered brother Danny Fog. Waco almost at once picks a second fight with Mark, which is interrupted when the herd Waco is helping to drive stampedes. Waco then redeems himself in the eyes of Dusty and Mark when he mercy-kills his injured horse rather than let it be trampled by the cattle, gravely risking his own life to do it, and is successfully rescued by Dusty. Owing Dusty his life, Waco soon tries to repay the favour when the Floating Outfit are ambushed, though as it turns out Dusty and Waco each save the other. From then on Waco idolises Dusty and eagerly joins him when his employer, Clay Allison, offers him the chance, knowing that he himself is a poor role-model for the young man. Over time he learns law work from Dusty, brawling from Mark whom he grows to almost match in stature, and tracking from the Kid. He later becomes a lawman independently from the Floating Outfit, first as an Arizona Ranger, then as the sheriff of Two Forks County in Utah, and eventually (by the time of Hound Dog Man) a United States Marshal. He is nearly the equal of his illustrious teachers in each respect, as well as learning about crooked gambling from Frank Derringer. Originally using a pair of 1860 Army Colts, Waco adopts Artillery Peacemakers in The Peacemakers and, on a trip to Chicago (in Waco's Debt) Waco is introduced to the Winchester Model 1876 "Centennial" rifle, liking its superior range and hitting power. Waco rides a paint stallion, formerly part of Clay Allison's remuda, clearly as a tribute to Dusty's own paint and also named after Dusty. At the conclusion of The Drifter, Waco is about to marry rancher Beth Morrow.

=== Doc Leroy ===
Doc (Marvin Elldridge Leroy) is so known because he was a medical student before family concerns forced him to abandon his studies and earn his living as a cowhand. He is able and willing to put his medical knowledge to good use on the trail, delivering several babies, treating gunshot and other wounds, setting bones, and on one occasion ("Statute of Limitations" in Sagebrush Sleuth) caring for a small mining town that has fallen victim to typhoid. Although it is widely reputed that Leroy once performed an emergency appendectomy with a Bowie knife, Doc Leroy M.D. reveals that this is only cowhand legend and he in fact carries and uses bona fide surgical instruments. During his early career as a cowhand Leroy rode with the Wedge, a contract trail-driving crew led by Stone Hart, but he later transfers to the O.D. Connected. Unlike Dusty, Mark and Waco, Leroy uses only a single revolver (an Army Colt, and later an ivory-handled Civilian Peacemaker) but, as mentioned in Doc Leroy M.D. and The Drifter, he is slightly faster with this single gun than Dusty is with his pair. Leroy later joins Waco in serving as an Arizona Ranger before finally receiving the chance to finish qualifying for his medical degree. By this time he has married Lynn Baker, actually Beth Morrow's sister (the two were brought up estranged and in separate households before learning of each other's existence) and so become Waco's brother-in-law.

=== Red Blaze ===
Red is so named for the colour of his hair, and even Ole Devil Hardin typically refers to him by that nickname. A cousin of Dusty's, Red also serves in the Confederate army during the Civil War as a non-commissioned officer, fighting bravely and with skill. After the War he becomes a member of the O. D. Connected ranch crew and an occasional member of the Floating Outfit. Red is noted for his temper and hot-headedness but when given independent responsibility adopts a more serious and thoughtful approach. Only in the Ysabel Kid's class with a revolver, Red is good albeit not exceptional with his .56-calibre Spencer carbine, a large-calibre weapon that tends to command respect, and proves well able (in Waco's Debt) to make good use of an obsolete Kentucky long rifle. A competent cowhand who rides a claybank stallion, Red enjoys a fair fight with bare hands and has more skill than most having been trained by Mark Counter. Red meets Sue Ortega during the events of Wagons to Backsight and is about to marry her at the end of the book.

=== Ole Devil Hardin ===
Ole Devil (Jackson Baines Hardin) is Dusty's uncle, known as "Ole Devil" partly because his angular features, dark beard and hair (the latter tending to form tufts that resemble horns) lend him an appearance similar to traditional depictions of Satan, and partly because his youthful adventurousness and aggression earned him the reputation of being a "real ole devil" for a fight. In his youth Hardin was involved in several adventures concerned with Texas's drive for independence from Mexico, and later he was commissioned as a general in the Confederate States Army where he was considered an extremely able commander. After the War Hardin returned to his "O.D. Connected" ranch intending to devote himself to the cattle business which he, along with a number of like-minded men, viewed as Texas's best immediate prospect for economic recovery, but he suffered an irreparable spinal injury when thrown by a horse he was considering buying and used a wheelchair for the rest of his life. He continued to rule the O.D. Connected with a stern but fair hand, relying on the Floating Outfit to carry out his wishes and often sending them to the aid of friends or relatives who had need of their talents. Despite his sternness, Hardin has a soft spot for his granddaughter Betty Hardin, and occasionally shows a keen humour and generosity to the young men he normally treats severely, such as when, having scolded Red Blaze for his gaudy neckwear, Hardin rewards him for a job well done with a still more outlandish silk bandana that he had bought for himself as a young man ("Cousin Red's Big Chance" in The Hard Riders). Although formerly having been in arms against Mexico, Hardin retains many important friends south of the border, including even one (Don Ruiz Villaneuva, in The Peacemakers) who fought on the Mexican side at the siege of the Alamo. His eventual death is reported at the conclusion of Doc Leroy M. D..

=== Tommy Okasi ===
Tommy (real forename unknown) is Ole Devil's companion in his earlier adventures, and his manservant during the Civil War and afterwards. An exiled samurai who has fled Japan over some unexplained disagreement with a powerful shogun, Tommy is a master of typical samurai weapons such as sword and bow (his sword is stated to be a tachi rather than a katana although the former type of sword had not been made since the 1500s (European calendar)) as well as ju-jitsu and karate. Tommy serves Ole Devil loyally and well, settling generally peacefully into American society although having to correct some individuals who take him for a meek Chinese immigrant who can be bullied with impunity. When in company with the young Ole Devil, Tommy shows a quirky sense of humour that lends itself to "Confucius Say..." jokes, though instead of attributing them to the famous Chinese philosopher Tommy prefaces them with "Ancient and wise Japanese saying, which I've just made up...". Tommy teaches ju-jitsu and karate to both Dusty Fog and Betty Hardin, allowing them both a useful edge over much larger and stronger men for their own safety. When of comparatively advanced age (in Sidewinder) Tommy is still fit and strong, and in regular practice, enough to be capable of feats of tameshiwari that astonish a captured Waw'ai Comanche warrior.

=== Calamity Jane ===
Calamity (Martha Jane Canary) is acknowledged by the author not to be the historical character of that name. As presented in the books, she is a young woman in her late teens or early twenties who fled a convent school to join a freight-driving crew led by Dobe Killem. Initially she made herself useful by stepping in for their drunken cook, but soon learned how to manage a team of heavy horses, fight with a whip, and shoot competently with either a .36-calibre Navy Colt or a Winchester carbine (both chosen to suit her smaller, less muscular frame). She has several adventures of her own in addition to intermittently associating with the Floating Outfit. While enjoying an on-off physical relationship with Mark Counter, it is mutually understood that they are only what a later century would call "Friends with benefits", and she enjoys other male company routinely, including on one occasion the Ysabel Kid (in White Stallion, Red Mare). In addition to her freight-driving skills, Calamity is a tough fist-fighter who is almost never beaten by a woman – not even a trained prize-fighter billed as the World Champion – and makes good use of Indian-style medicine learned from a Pawnee wise-woman (including an effective contraceptive method also known by Belle Starr, mentioned in Guns in the Night). Although hot-headed and prone to both speak and act without thinking, Calamity is brave and determined, and regarded with affection by the Floating Outfit even as they wait for the trouble to start.

=== Betty Hardin ===
Betty is Ole Devil's favourite granddaughter who runs the Hardin household with firm but fair discipline and whose orders are never questioned even when they restrict Ole Devil himself (in The Ysabel Kid, Tommy Okasi informs Hardin that Betty's orders bar him from drinking burgundy during the daytime). Although a good-looking, well-educated and gently bred Southern girl, Betty possesses a strong streak of independence and has both the inclination and the aptitude to hunt stock-killing cougar backed only by a team of her own hounds. Betty also carries a Merwin Hulbert revolver in a concealed shoulder clip and is nearly as expert with ju-jitsu as Dusty is; in Rio Hondo War, Betty shows her ability by trapping Dusty in a submission hold that he could only have broken using a more dangerous counter than he was willing to use, and in McGraw's Inheritance she uses a throw to discourage a drunken cowhand from taking liberties with her. On another occasion, Betty successfully cows an inexperienced outlaw gang by sheer force of personality, such that by the time she is rescued her kidnappers are willing to admit that they would likely have ended up paying Ole Devil Hardin to take her back. Also in Rio Hondo War, Betty rescues Johnny Raybold from a murderous ambush, and the two soon become attracted to each other, not least over a shared interest in hunting; by the end of the story, Ole Devil has granted permission for the two to marry.

== Inconsistencies ==
One of the features of J.T.Edson's writing is his willingness to write stories which conflict with previous books. Most of the "expansions" do not just add features to the original story but actually change the original story. Edson explains it thus: "When supplying us with the information from which we produce our books, one of the strictest rules imposed upon us by the present-day members of what we call the 'Hardin, Fog and Blaze' clan and the 'Counter' family is that we never under any circumstances disclose their true identities or their current whereabouts. Furthermore, we are instructed to always include sufficient inconsistencies to ensure that neither can happen inadvertently".

The most striking inconsistency surrounds Dusty Fog and Freddie Woods. Dusty and Freddie meet in The Trouble Busters (published 1965) when Dusty takes on as Town Marshal for a few weeks. They meet subsequently from time-to-time (e.g. Buffalo are Coming, The Fortune Hunters) when Dusty was in Kansas with trail herds etc. and become increasingly close, culminating in Dusty pondering marriage in Guns in the Night (last book in Floating Outfit series) at the end of which he decides to settle down and "send for Freddie". Notwithstanding these previously published books, it turns out in Decision for Dusty Fog (published in 1986) that Dusty and Freddie were actually married in Mulrooney when Dusty was marshal, a few weeks after they first met.

JT notes also Dusty's romantic links with Belle Boyd, Candy Carde and Emma Nene in various Floating Outfit novels and apologises in The Code of Dusty Fog for 'creating the misconception'.

== 1980s ==
After being enormously prolific through the 1970s, culminating in the publication of JT's Hundredth in 1979, his style began to gradually change. His plots became simpler (e.g., Beguinage / Beguinage is Dead) and his previously thorough approach to detail became even more so. In many cases, a fight scene that would have lasted 10 seconds ran over many pages.

JT's political beliefs became more and more prominent in his writings, to summarise a few:

- The American Civil War was all about the right to secede and had little to do with slavery;
- Cowboys (Texans in particular) were routinely victimised* in Kansan trail end towns;* as told in Trail Boss, page 182, pp. 5
- Anyone with "liberal" beliefs is likely to be intolerant of others, believe that they are superior beings, are usually idle and dirty, and (in his later books) are likely to be homosexual.
- Homosexuality is sexual deviance;
- Punitive jail terms and capital punishment are mandatory for a strong society

There is a huge difference between the pace and complexity of the plots of Trail Boss (1963) and Diamonds, Emeralds, Cards and Colts (1986). To illustrate the point, he began revising, changing and expanding previously published short stories and publishing them as full novels (sometimes 2 novels):

- Dusty Fog the School Teacher from Hard Riders became Master of Triggernometry;
- Sam Ysabel's Son from The Texan became Old Moccasins on the Trail;
- Part 1 – The Setup from Sagebrush Sleuth became Waco's Badge;
- Part 1 – The Futility of War from Fastest Gun in Texas became A Matter of Honour;
- Part 1 – The Half-Breed from The Half-Breed became White Indians;
- Part 2 – The Quartet from The Half-Breed became Texas Kidnappers;
- Part 1 – Better than Calamity from The Wildcats expanded into 2 books – The Hide and Horn Saloon and Cut One, They All Bleed;
- Part 1 – The Bounty on Belle Starr's Scalp from Troubled Range was expanded into Calamity, Mark and Belle.

Despite selling over 27 million books globally and producing over 100 books, his books fell out of favour with UK publishers and from the 1990s were only published in the USA.

== 1990s ==
Towards the 1990s as his health began to fail, as well as the expansions, he primarily wrote "fill in the gaps" books or anthologies of short stories about characters. The last J T Edson book available in the UK, Mark Counter's Kin, was an anthology. However, he also wrote and published the first three in a quartet of new books designed to fill in what happened to Dusty Fog, Mark Counter and Lon Ysabel as they made their way home to the OD Connected after the events of the Floating Outfit title Return to Backsight (which Edson used as a springboard to launch his Waco series): Wedge Goes To Arizona, Arizona Range War and Arizona Gun Law are only available via American bookstores, as is his long-promised "Belle Boyd"-centric novel, Mississippi Raider (also a new work). The final book in the quartet, Arizona Takeover, was apparently not published.

He eventually decided to semi-retire by 1999 but didn't stop writing. He would often come up with plots at his local Public House. However, by 2005, his failing health forced him to retire from writing, frustrating him as he had been unable to complete the five tie-up titles for his respective series, including Miz Freddie of Kansas which was to have been an anthology of supposed anecdotes and reminiscences being told directly to the reader by Freddie Fog née Woods, as an aged octogenarian, with one story being how Dusty, Mark and Lon, his three primary protagonists, were killed fighting Mau Mau terrorists in Kenya in 1911. However, many years of active, manual work involving a lot of movement, such as postman and café owner, had caused him severe joint problems, as had the cumulative effect of long hours hunched over a heavy old manual typewriter in cold, draughty barracks, and a yo-yo weight problem caused by an underlying medical condition.

His American publishers Dell and later HarperCollins began to periodically reissue his books, though they changed the titles of some books. Title changes were as follows:

- .44 Calibre Man is now Forty-Four Caliber Man (1980);
- Beguinage became The Texas Assassin (1986);
- Master of Triggernometry became The Trigger Master (1986);
- You're in Command Now, Mr Fog is now Rebel Vengeance (1987);
- Diamonds, Emeralds, Cards & Colts became simply Cards and Colts (1988);
- Back to the Bloody Border is now Renegade (1989);
- Calamity, Mark and Belle became Texas Trio (1989);
- Beguinage is Dead ! became The Lone Star Killers (1990) and Texas Killers (2004);
- Set A-Foot is now The Nighthawk (1990);
- You're a Texas Ranger, Alvin Fog is now Alvin Fog, Texas Ranger (1991);
- Set Texas Back on her Feet is now Viridian's Trail (1992);
- Get Urrea! is now Texas Fury (1993);
- Is-A-Man became Texas Warrior (1997);
- Wanted! Belle Starr became Oklahoma Outlaw (1997);
- The Cow Thieves became Running Irons (2005);
- Calamity Spells Trouble is now The Road To Ratchet Creek (2005);
- White Stallion, Red Mare was republished as Ranch War (2006).

Miz Freddie of Kansas, an anthology of anecdotes related by the octogenarian widow of Dusty Fog in which, so Edson promised, would be revealed details of how Dusty, Mark and Lon were killed together in Kenya, Africa in 1911.

J T Edson had had 137 books published and had sold over 27 million copies globally. J T Edson has at least one complete, unpublished novel, Amazons of Zillikian, which was #5 in the Bunduki series, but which remained unpublished due to his disillusion with the intransigence of the Edgar Rice Burroughs estate, as mentioned by Laurence Dunn in his online article. In November 2023, Piccadilly Publishing published Amazons of Zillikian.

During 1994, two made for TV films were produced, Guns of Honor, based on The Ysabel Kid and Wanted: Belle Starr and Trigger Fast, an adaptation of the novel of the same name, which were loosely based on the Floating Outfit series. Starring Christopher Atkins as Dusty Fog and Martin Sheen as Ol Devil Hardin, the two films were produced in South Africa.

== Controversies ==
For many years from the 1950s – 1970s J T Edson's books were hugely popular. However, in the 1980s he increasingly clashed with UK publishers over his books' treatment and portrayal of racial politics and issues in the post-Civil War Southern States.

J T Edson's treatment of racial politics and issues in the post-Civil War South dealt with potentially controversial issues. His novel, The Hooded Riders, portrayed a Ku Klux Klan like organisation as a heroic resistance group. His heroes, Dusty Fog and Mark Counter, are responsible for founding this group; however, the group is formed to deal with a specific emergency (an attempt to seize land from North Texas ranchers and farmers to control key land routes and cripple Texas' cattle exports) and is permanently dissolved once the antagonist has been brought to justice. Moreover, Dusty Fog himself speaks disparagingly of the Klan and plainly has no affection for it. The same novel also portrays the outlaw and gunfighter John Wesley Hardin as a wrongly accused hero, and his killing of a black man is presented as self-defence. The novel also refers to Reconstruction as a "period of stupidity and bigotry" directed against white Southerners. In other novels, Edson refers to black slaves in the South who came to the defence of their masters against Northerners.
