= Dog Justice =

1928 film directed by Jerome Storm

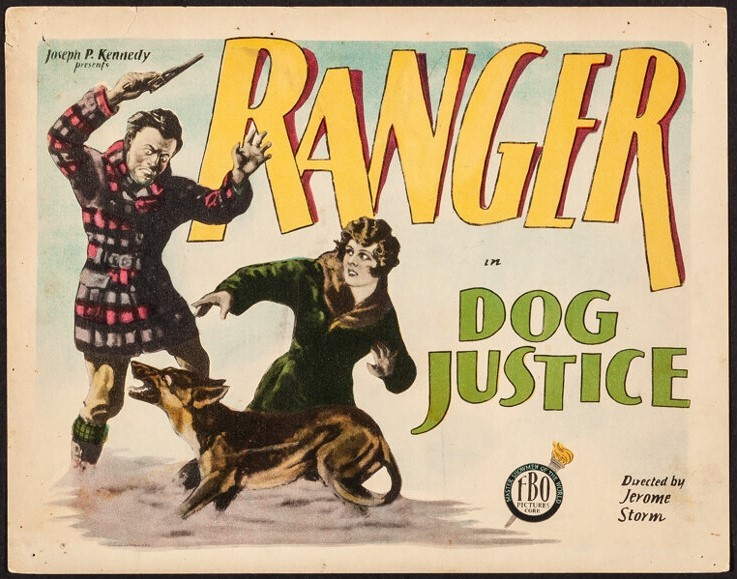
- Directed by: Jerome Storm
- Written by: Ethel Hill; Randolph Bartlett
- Starring: Edward Hearn; Nita Martan
- Cinematography: Nicholas Musuraca
- Edited by: Jack Kitchin
- Production company: Film Booking Offices of America
- Distributed by: Film Booking Offices of America
- Release date: June 10, 1928
- Running time: 60 minutes
- Country: United States
- Languages: Silent; English intertitles

Dog Justice is a 1928 American silent action film directed by Jerome Storm and starring Edward Hearn and Nita Martan.

== Cast ==
- Ranger the Dog as Ranger
- Edward Hearn as Jimmie O'Neil
- Nita Martan as Babbette
- Jim Welch as Baptiste, her grandfather
- Albert J. Smith as Pierre La Grande, prospector
- John Northpole as Flint, mine owner

== Bibliography ==
- Munden, Kenneth White. The American Film Institute Catalog of Motion Pictures Produced in the United States, Part 1. University of California Press, 1997.
