= Korak (character) =

Fictional character

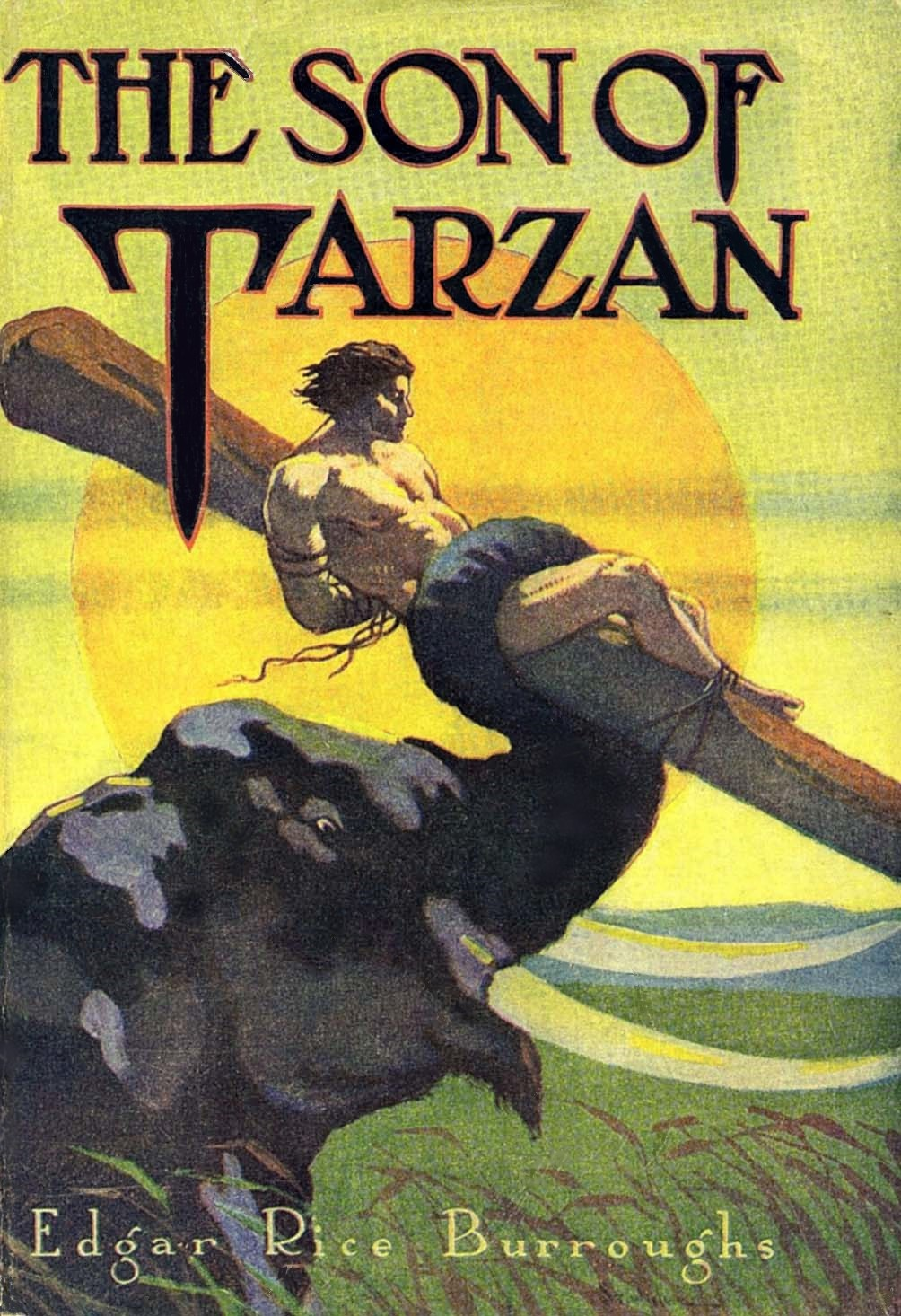
- Dust cover of The Son of Tarzan (First edition, 1917), depicting Korak
- First appearance: The Eternal Lover
- Last appearance: Tarzan and the Ant Men
- Created by: Edgar Rice Burroughs
- Portrayed by: Gordon Griffith; Kamuela C. Searle

In-universe information
- Alias: Jack Clayton
- Gender: Male
- Occupation: Adventurer, hunter, trapper, fisherman
- Family: Tarzan (father); Jane Porter (mother)
- Spouse: Meriem (wife)
- Children: Jackie Clayton (son)
- Nationality: English/American

Korak is a fictional character in Edgar Rice Burroughs's Tarzan novel series and its adaptations. Known by civilan name John "Jack" Clayton III, Korak is the son of Tarzan and Jane Porter.

== History ==
Jack first appeared in the original Tarzan novels by Edgar Rice Burroughs. He was introduced as an infant in the non-Tarzan novel The Eternal Lover (later retitled The Eternal Savage), in which the Ape Man and his family played supporting roles. His next appearance (still as an infant) was in The Beasts of Tarzan, the third Tarzan novel, in which his father Tarzan was kidnapped and taken to West Africa. The story of his youth and growth to manhood was told in the fourth novel, The Son of Tarzan, in which he returned to sub-Saharan Africa and lived in the jungle, taking for the first time the name Korak ("Killer" in the language of the Great Apes). Most references to him were as "Korak the Killer".

Half of the book relates to Meriem, the girl he rescues from a beating. The two of them run wild in the forest for years before being separated. After many adventures, they are re-united and eventually marry.

Korak was later used as a supporting character in the eighth through the tenth entries in the series, Tarzan the Terrible, Tarzan and the Golden Lion, and Tarzan and the Ant Men. The last of those three also briefly mentions Korak and Meriem's young son "Jackie". The Bunduki series by J. T. Edson - authorized by the Burroughs estate - includes Korak and Meriem's granddaughter Dawn as one of two main characters.

== In other media ==
Besides the Burroughs novels, Korak also appeared in the 1920 movie serial The Son of Tarzan, the Tarzan comic strip, in which he was a major character for many years; and the Tarzan, Korak, Son of Tarzan, and Tarzan Family comic books.

In the Johnny Weissmuller Tarzan films, Korak was replaced by an adopted son called Boy (played by Johnny Sheffield). Tarzan and Jane never married in these films (they do in the books), and the substitution was made to avoid censorship. In the Dell comic books of the 1950s, which combine material from the books and the films, Tarzan's son was also called Boy. When the Tarzan comics returned to a more faithful portrayal of Burroughs' characters in the early 1960s, Boy revealed himself to truly be called Korak, going on to later be featured in his own comic book.

=== Portrayal in film ===
- Gordon Griffith (youth) 1920
- Kamuela C. Searle (adult) 1920

=== Comic books ===
- Gold Key Comics published Korak, Son of Tarzan #1–45 from January 1964 to January 1972. It featured work by Russ Manning, Warren Tufts, Dan Spiegle, and others. George Wilson drew several covers for the series. In 2013, Dark Horse Comics reprinted the Gold Key issues drawn by Manning in hardcover format.
- DC Comics acquired the publication licensing rights to the series in 1972, continuing the numbering from #46–59 (June 1972 to September–October 1975), when it was renamed The Tarzan Family. The retitled series ran an additional seven issues #60–66 (November–December 1975 to November–December 1976) Both series also included other Burroughs' characters. The Korak series featured work from writers Len Wein and Robert Kanigher and artists Frank Thorne, Murphy Anderson, and Rudy Florese. "Carson of Venus" by Wein and Michael Kaluta was the backup feature in issues #46–56.
