= Lady Be Good (1928 film) =

1928 film

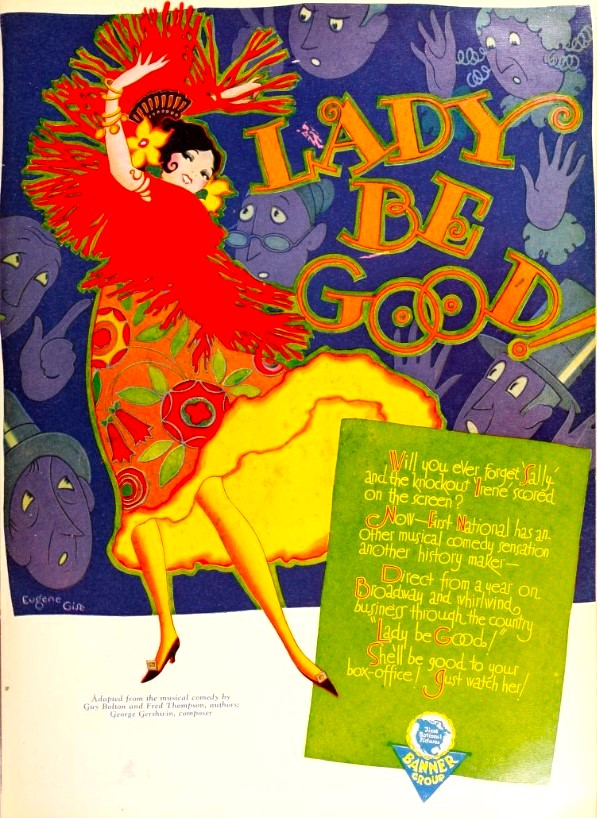
- 1926 advertisement
- Directed by: Richard Wallace
- Written by: Adelaide Heilbron; Jack Wagner; Sidney Lazarus (intertitles); Gene Towne (intertitles)
- Based on: Lady Be Good; 1924 by George Gershwin
- Produced by: Charles R. Rogers
- Starring: Dorothy Mackaill; Jack Mulhall
- Cinematography: George J. Folsey
- Edited by: Stuart Heisler
- Distributed by: First National Pictures
- Release date: May 6, 1928 (United States)
- Running time: 70 minutes
- Country: United States
- Language: Silent (English intertitles)

Lady Be Good is a 1928 American silent romantic comedy film directed by Richard Wallace. The film is based on the 1924 musical of the same name by George Gershwin and starred Jack Mulhall and Dorothy Mackaill.

== Cast ==
- Jack Mulhall as "Mysterio" the magician
- Dorothy Mackaill as his assistant
- John Miljan as Murray
- Nita Martan as Madison
- Dot Farley as Texas West
- James Finlayson as Trelawney West
- Aggie Herring as Landlady
- Jay Eaton as Dancer
- Eddie Clayton as Dancer
- Yola d'Avril as Assistant
- Don Charno and His Martini Orchestra (uncredited)
- Charlie Hall as Backstage Actor in Blackface (uncredited)

== Preservation ==
Lady Be Good is currently presumed lost. In February of 2021, the film was cited by the National Film Preservation Board on their Lost U.S. Silent Feature Films list.
