= His Majesty, the American =

1919 film

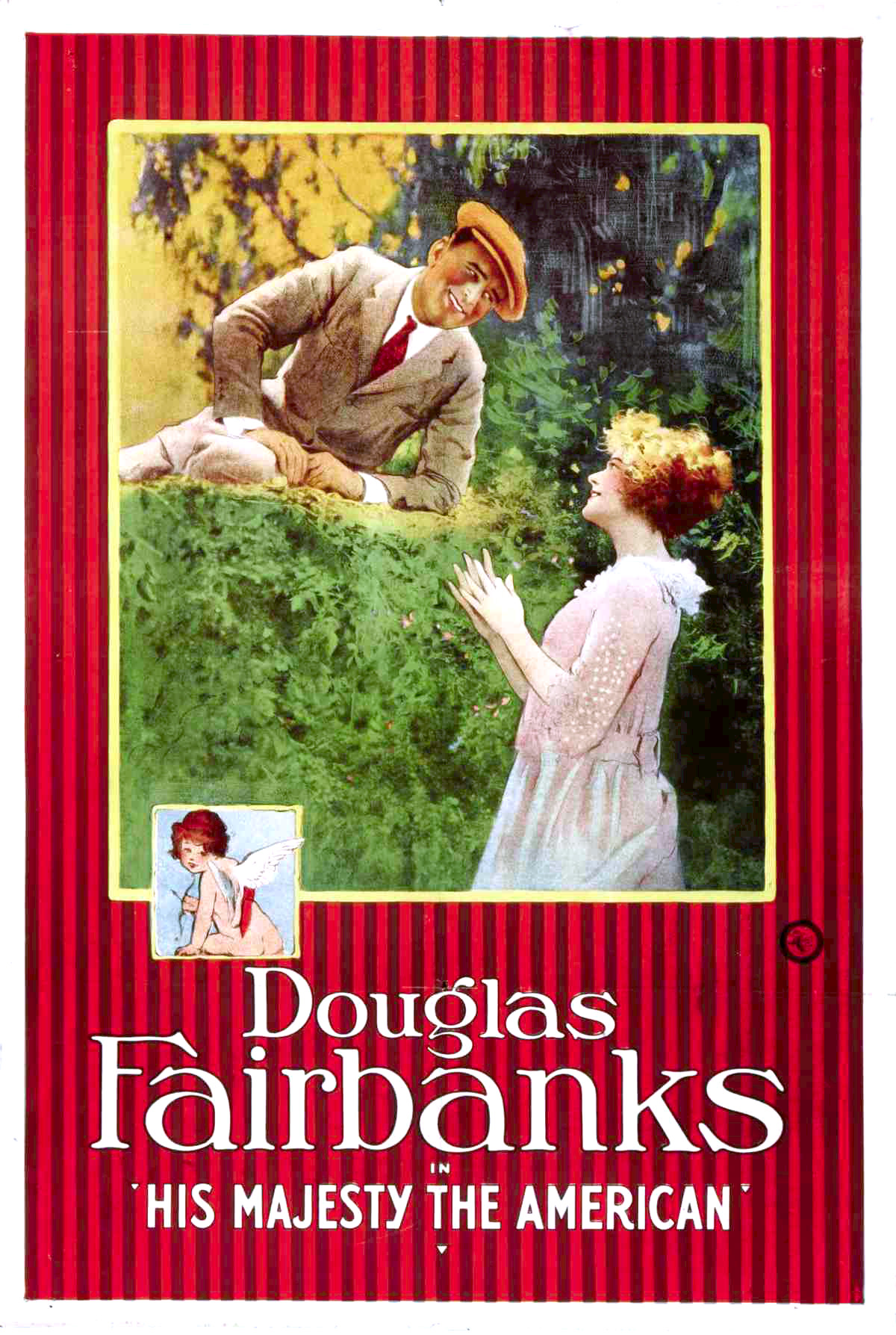
- Theatrical release poster
- Directed by: Joseph Henabery
- Written by: Joseph Henabery; Douglas Fairbanks (credited as "Elton Banks")
- Produced by: Douglas Fairbanks
- Starring: Douglas Fairbanks; Marjorie Daw
- Cinematography: Victor Fleming; Glen MacWilliams
- Distributed by: United Artists
- Release date: August 31, 1919 (Chicago)
- Running time: 96 minutes
- Country: United States
- Language: Silent (English intertitles)
- Budget: $300,000

The film

His Majesty, the American is a 1919 American silent comedy film directed by Joseph Henabery and starring Douglas Fairbanks. It was the first film produced for distribution by United Artists, and was released in the U.K. as One of the Blood. Prints exist in the film holdings of Cohen Media Group (Raymond Rohauer collection) [a 35mm positive]; in the film holdings of EmGee Film Library [a 16mm reduction positive]; and in private film collections [a 16mm reduction positives].

This was one of Boris Karloff's earliest acting jobs in the movie industry. He can be spotted in the scene where Sarzeau's men storm the inn where Bill Brooks is staying. Karloff is at the front of the crowd, wearing a thick mustache and a cloth cap. He can also be seen on the staircase as the men race up the stairs to Bill Brooks's room.

== Plot ==
As described in a film magazine, Bill, whose hair raising antics have made him the talk of New York City, decides to leave the metropolis after a new district attorney starts cracking down on minor offenses, and visits Mexico in search of adventure. He receives a telegram for a foreign country asking him to come at once to its capital. At the train station he is met by a mysterious stranger and told he will be summoned when the time is right. A rebellion is brewing and the plotters seek to capture him, but Bill eludes them. The King gathers his court around him while the rabble, headed by the traitorous Minister of War, storm the castle. Bill dons the uniform of an army officer and goes to an outlying garrison, and returns to the capital with the troops and restores quiet. The King presents Bill as heir apparent and future ruler of the country. Bill's romance with a pretty member of the court is allowed to progress to the altar.

== Cast ==
- Douglas Fairbanks as Bill (William) Brooks
- Marjorie Daw as Felice, the Countess of Montenac
- Frank Campeau as Grand Duke Sarzeau
- Sam Southern as the King Phillipe IV
- Jay Dwiggins as Emile Metz
- Lillian Langdon as Princess Marguerite
- Albert MacQuarrie as Undetermined Role (credited as Albert McQuarrie)
- Bull Montana as Undetermined Role
- William Gillis as Undetermined Role (credited as Will Gillis)
- Phil Gastrock as Undetermined Role (credited as Phil Gastrox)
- Boris Karloff as the Henchman in the cloth cap (uncredited)
- Karla Schramm (uncredited)
- Charles Stevens as an officer (uncredited)

== See also ==
- Boris Karloff filmography
