= Borrowed Wives =

1930 film

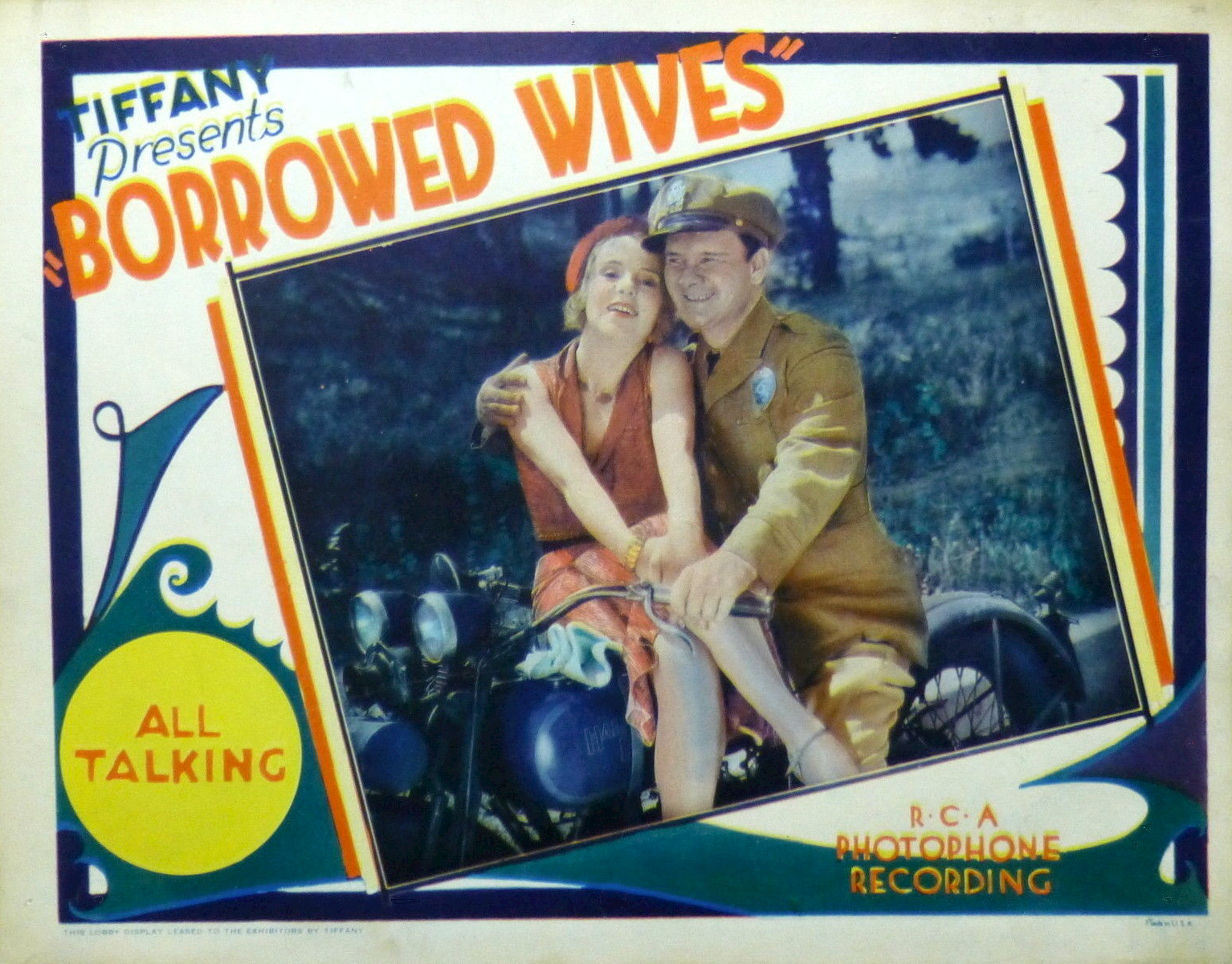
- Lobby card
- Directed by: Frank R. Strayer
- Written by: Scott Darling
- Starring: Rex Lease; Vera Reynolds; Nita Martan; Paul Hurst; Sam Hardy
- Cinematography: André Barlatier
- Edited by: Byron Robinson
- Production company: Tiffany Pictures
- Release date: August 20, 1930
- Running time: 61 minutes
- Country: United States
- Language: English

Borrowed Wives

Borrowed Wives is a 1930 American pre-Code comedy film directed by Frank R. Strayer. It stars silent performers Vera Reynolds, Rex Lease, and Sam Hardy. It was distributed by Tiffany Pictures.

== Plot ==
Peter Foley (Rex Lease) is a beneficiary of his grandfather, who leaves him $800,000 in his will, on the condition that he gets married. Peter is very interested in getting the money, especially since he has debts, and plans to marry Alice Blake (Vera Reynolds) as soon as she arrives from Kansas City. He plans to take her to his Uncle Henry's (Charles Sellon) home before midnight to actually get the inheritance. The uncle needs to see the girl whom Peter is about to marry before he will turn over the money.

Alice's airplane is delayed, though. Parker (Sam Hardy), Peter's creditor, insists that his own girl friend, Julia (Nita Martan), pose as Peter's wife in the meantime. Alice is informed by Joe Blair (Robert Livingston), a man who is secretly interested in marrying Alice himself, that Peter is actually married to Julia. Alice agrees to marry Joe if this is true. Peter and Julia are pursued by Bull (Paul Hurst), a motorcycle policeman who loves Julia. Further complications arise at Uncle Henry's, when lawyer Winstead (Harry Todd), who is found bound and gagged, agrees to marry them. The uncle, revealed to be posing as a paralytic, is exposed as a villain, but Peter and Alice are ultimately married before the last hour appointed in the will.

== Cast ==
- Rex Lease as Peter Foley
- Vera Reynolds as Alice Blake
- Nita Martan as Julia Thorpe
- Paul Hurst as Bull Morgan
- Robert Livingston as Joe Blair
- Charles Sellon as Uncle Henry
- Dorothea Wolbert as Aunt Mary
- Sam Hardy as G.W. Parker
- Harry Todd as Lawyer Winstead
- Tom London as Mac - the Cop
- Eddy Chandler as Police Sergeant

== Preservation status ==
Borrowed Wives is preserved in the Library of Congress collection.
