= The Aliens (comics) =

Publication information
- Publisher: Gold Key Comics
- First appearance: Magnus, Robot Fighter 4000 A.D. #1 (1963)
- Created by: Russ Manning

The Aliens is a 1963-1969 serialized science fiction story that ran in the back of Gold Key Comics' Magnus: Robot Fighter comic book series starting with issue #1 (Feb 1963). The series was produced by writer/artist Russ Manning. Originally, Manning assumed that the backup feature would be a one-shot, and borrowed the story from Murray Leinster's 1945 novelette First Contact. The publisher liked the story enough to make a regular back-up feature.

The series was left unresolved on a cliff-hanger at issue #28 (Nov 1969).

== Premise ==
The Aliens is set is the far distant future. Captain Johner and his crew encounter an alien spacecraft 3,000 light years from earth. The aliens attack first, doing so as a precaution to protect their planet. Captain Johner fights off the attack and meets with Zarz, the alien commander. The Captain manages to convince Zarz that both species can co-exist if they learn to trust each other. To that end, half of Captain Johner's crew accompanies Commander Zarz's ship. Similarly, Commander Zarz and three of his crewmen accompany Captain Johner on their adventures through space.

== Chapters ==
1. Untitled (Feb 1963)
2. Space Derelict (May 1963)
3. A Matter of Judgment (Aug 1963)
4. Suspense in Space (Nov 1963)
5. Forced Landing (Feb 1964)
6. A Case of Nerves (May 1964)
7. The Dream Makers (Aug 1964)
8. An Alien Welcome (Nov 1964)
9. Talk Down (Feb 1965)
10. Fear of the Unknown (May 1965)
11. False Men (Aug 1965)
12. The Time Distorters (Nov 1965)
13. The Day of the Nightmare (Feb 1966)
14. The Conspiracy (May 1966)
15. Defensive Weapon (Aug 1966)
16. Rescue (Nov 1966)
17. Crystals of Life (Feb 1967)
18. The Crystal Crawler (May 1967)
19. An Alien Phobia (Aug 1967)
20. The Face of Time (Nov 1967)
21. Into the Abyss (Feb 1968)
22. The Incredible Jewels (May 1968)
23. The Danger From Beyond (Aug 1968)
24. The Seeds of Destruction (Nov 1968)
25. The Frigid Intruder (Feb 1969)
26. Cosmic Blight (May 1969)
27. The Space Wizard (Aug 1969)
28. The Ghost Planet (Nov 1969)

== Reprints ==
Valiant reprinted the first 14 chapters in 1995 in a two issue series called Captain Johner & the Aliens.
