= Tarzan and the Tarzan Twins =

1963 collection of two Tarzan novellas by Edgar Rice Burroughs

- Dust-jacket illustration of Tarzan and the Tarzan Twins
- Author: Edgar Rice Burroughs
- Illustrator: Roy G. Krenkel
- Language: English
- Series: Tarzan series
- Genre: Adventure
- Publisher: Canaveral Press
- Publication date: 1927, 1936, 1963
- Publication place: United States
- Media type: Print (hardback)
- Pages: 192
- Preceded by: Tarzan and the Ant Men
- Followed by: Tarzan, Lord of the Jungle

Tarzan and the Tarzan Twins is a collection of two Tarzan novellas by American writer Edgar Rice Burroughs, for younger readers. It was originally published as two children's books, The Tarzan Twins by Voland in October 1927, and Tarzan and the Tarzan Twins, with Jad-bal-ja, the Golden Lion, by Whitman in March 1936. These were brought together in November 1963 under the title of Tarzan and the Tarzan Twins in the first complete edition.

Cover of The Tarzan Twins (1927)

Cover of Tarzan and the Tarzan Twins, with Jad-bal-ja, the Golden Lion (1936).

Despite the gap in when they were written and first published, the events of the two stories occur in the same time-frame. The opening passage of "Tarzan and the Tarzan Twins, with Jad-bal-ja, the Golden Lion" specifies that its events occur immediately after those of "The Tarzan Twins." In relation to other Tarzan stories, the two parts of the Tarzan Twins tale presumably fall between Tarzan and the Ant Men and Tarzan, Lord of the Jungle chronologically, as the initial part was published between these two novels. The second part confirms their placement in approximately this period, as it introduces a family that figures prominently in Tarzan and the Lost Empire, the next book after Tarzan, Lord of the Jungle; specifically, it features Tarzan's first meeting with Doctor Karl von Harben, with whom he is already acquainted in Empire. Because Twins is a children's book, however, it is customarily omitted from listings of the main Tarzan series. Thus Tarzan, Lord of the Jungle is generally considered the eleventh Tarzan book rather than Twins.

== Plot ==
Two schoolboys, Dick and Doc, are cousins who resemble each other because their mothers are twins. As Dick is also related to Tarzan through his father, they become known as the Tarzan Twins. Invited to visit Tarzan's African estate, they become lost in the jungle and are imprisoned by cannibals, from whom they escape. They are then reunited with their host, who introduces them to his pet lion, Jad-bal-ja.

Subsequently, they become involved in an adventure involving exiles from the lost city of Opar, who have kidnapped Gretchen von Harben, the daughter of a missionary. The brutish Oparians, adherents of the deposed and deceased high priest Cadj, are seeking a place to continue worship of the Flaming God in the traditional way, as Opar's Queen La has outlawed human sacrifice in the lost city. They plan to make their young captive Gretchen, whom they dub "Kla", meaning "New La", their new high priestess. She is eventually rescued by Tarzan and the twins, while Glum, leader of the exiles, and some of his adherents are killed. Tarzan orders the survivors to return to Opar and be loyal to La.

== Comic adaptations ==
The book has been adapted into comic form by Gold Key Comics in Tarzan no. 196, dated April 1971, with a script by Gaylord DuBois and art by Mike Royer.

Preceded by Tarzan and the Ant Men	Tarzan series Tarzan and the Tarzan Twins	Succeeded by Tarzan, Lord of the Jungle
