= Spawn of the Desert =

1923 film

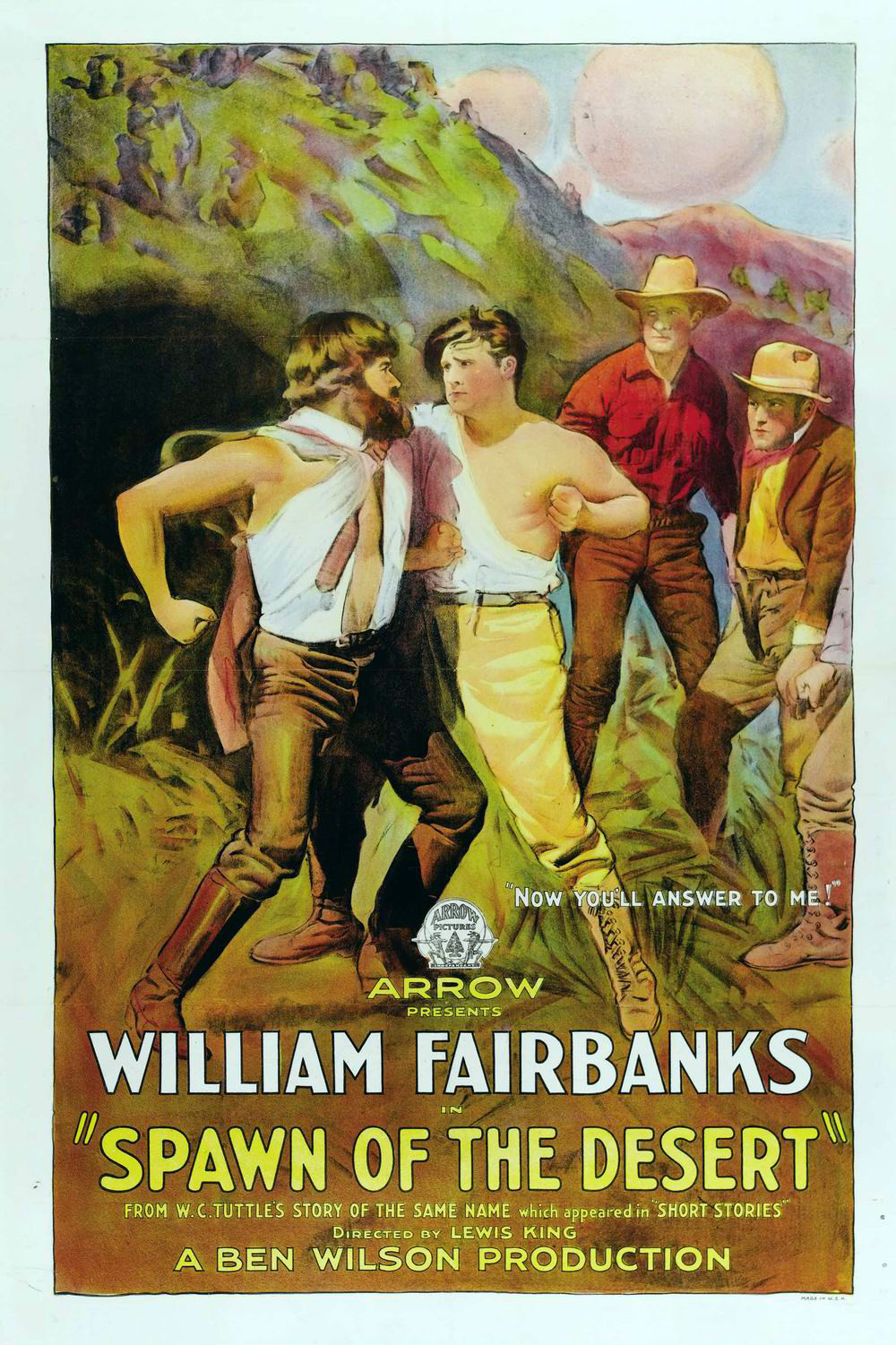
- Directed by: Louis King
- Written by: Daniel F. Whitcomb
- Based on: Spawn of the Desert by W.C. Tuttle
- Produced by: Ben F. Wilson
- Starring: William Fairbanks; Florence Gilbert; P. Dempsey Tabler
- Production company: Ben Wilson Productions
- Distributed by: Arrow Film Corporation
- Release date: January 10, 1923
- Running time: 50 minutes
- Country: United States
- Languages: Silent; English intertitles

Spawn of the Desert is a 1923 American silent Western film directed by Louis King and starring William Fairbanks, Florence Gilbert and P. Dempsey Tabler.

== Cast ==
- William Fairbanks as Duke Steele
- Florence Gilbert as Nola 'Luck' Sleed
- P. Dempsey Tabler as Silver Sleed
- Al Hart as Sam Le Saint

== Bibliography ==
- Munden, Kenneth White. The American Film Institute Catalog of Motion Pictures Produced in the United States, Part 1. University of California Press, 1997.
