= Tarzan and the Ant Men =

1924 novel by Edgar Rice Burroughs

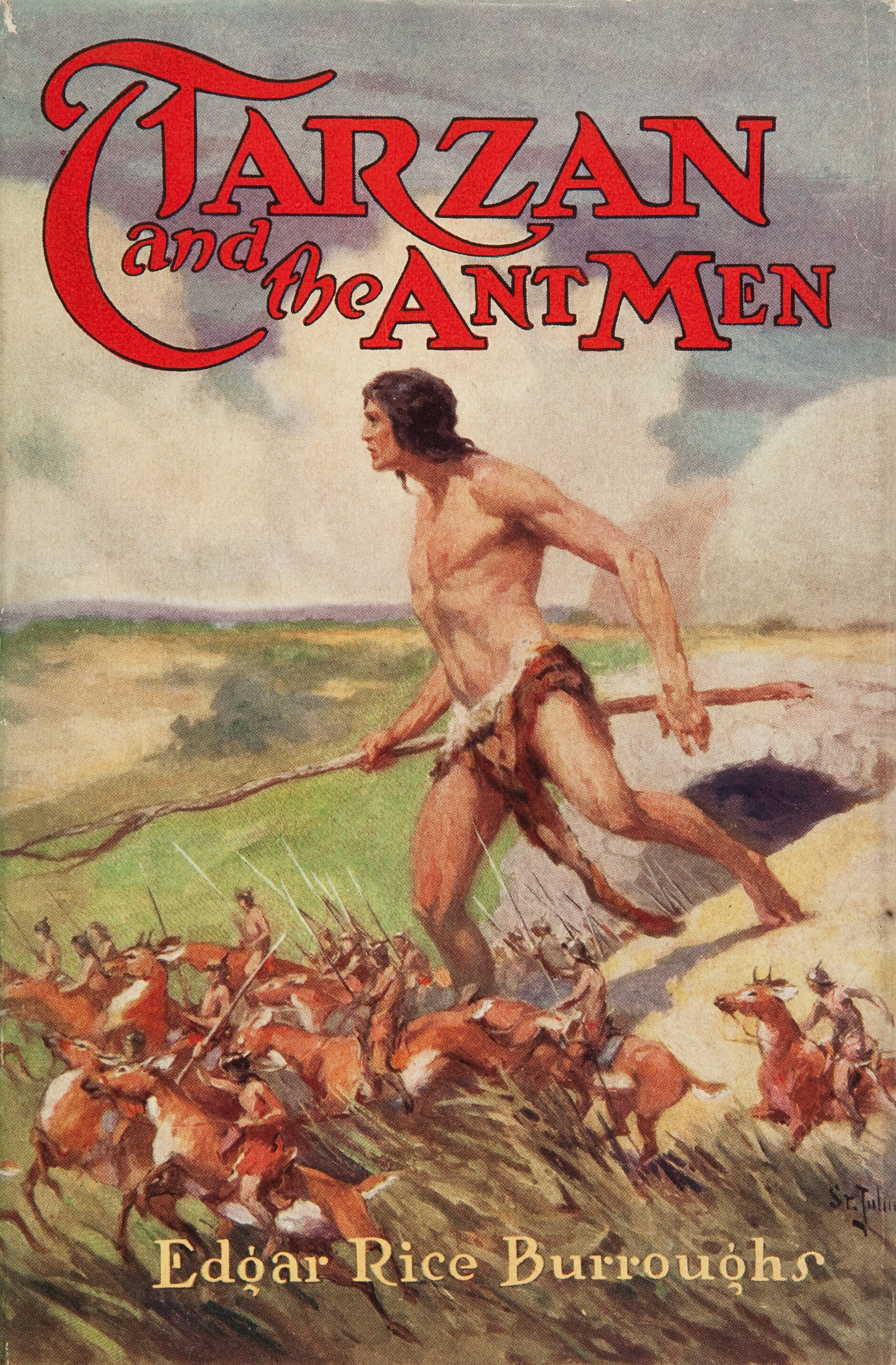
- First edition cover
- Author: Edgar Rice Burroughs
- Language: English
- Series: The Tarzan series
- Genre: Adventure
- Publisher: A. C. McClurg
- Publication date: 1924
- Publication place: United States
- Media type: Print (hardback)
- Pages: 346
- Preceded by: Tarzan and the Golden Lion
- Followed by: Tarzan and the Tarzan Twins
- Text: Tarzan and the Ant Men at Wikisource

Tarzan and the Ant Men is a novel by American writer Edgar Rice Burroughs, the tenth in his series of twenty-four books about the jungle hero Tarzan. It was first published as a seven-part serial in the magazine Argosy All-Story Weekly for February 2, 9, 16 and 23 and March 1, 8 and 15, 1924. The story was first published in book form in hardcover by A. C. McClurg in September 1924. It was also adapted for Gold Key Comics in Tarzan #174-175 (1968).

In the book Master of Adventure: The Worlds of Edgar Rice Burroughs, Richard A. Lupoff places Tarzan and the Ant Men in his list of essential Burroughs novels and states that it represents Burroughs at the peak of his creative powers.

== Plot summary ==
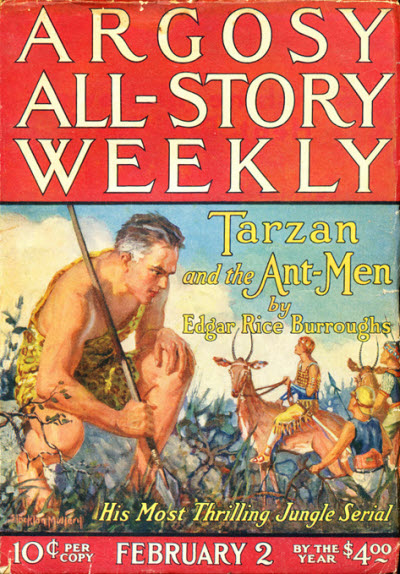
Argosy All-Story Weekly of February 2, 1924, with the serial installment Tarzan and the Ant Men as the cover story.

The story begins 1 year after the end of the previous novel (#9, Tarzan and the Golden Lion) which would place it around 1936 which would make Tarzan around 47 years old. His son Korak, now at about 23 has a verbal child, the grandchild of Tarzan.

Tarzan, the king of the jungle, enters an isolated country called Minuni, inhabited by a people four times smaller than himself, the Minunians, who live in magnificent city-states which frequently wage war against each other.

Tarzan befriends the king, Adendrohahkis, and the prince, Komodoflorensal, of one such city-state, called Trohanadalmakus, and joins them in war against the onslaught of the army of Veltopismakus, their warlike neighbours.

He is captured on the battle-ground and taken prisoner by the Veltopismakusians, whose scientist Zoanthrohago conducts an experiment reducing him to the size of a Minunian, and the ape-man is imprisoned and enslaved among other Trohanadalmakusian prisoners of war. He meets Komodoflorensal in the dungeons of Veltopismakus and together they are able to make a daring escape.

Spanish actor/Tarzan lookalike Esteban Miranda, who had been imprisoned in the village of Obebe, the cannibal, at the end of the previous novel, Tarzan and the Golden Lion, also appears in this adventure.

== Major themes ==
Burrough's view on what is a natural relationship between the sexes is neatly illustrated by a secondary narrative thread in the novel, that one about the Alali or Zertalacolols, an ape-like matriarchal people living in the thorny forests which isolate Minuni from the rest of the worlds. When the enslaved and persecuted Alali males see that Tarzan is a male too and yet stronger and more formidable than any Alali female, they go to war against the females, and by killing or maiming several of them, subjugate them. When Tarzan, towards the end of the novel, meets the Alali again, the females are submissive and obedient to their mates and actually prefer it that way.

The Minunian city states and their politics are strongly reminiscent of those of Barsoom. They also share the Barsoomian philosophy of perpetual war as a good and commendable state, as illustrated by the words of Gefasto, the Commander in Chief of the Veltopismakusian armed forces:

We must have war. As we have found that there is no enduring happiness in peace or virtue, let us have a little war and a little sin. A pudding that is all of one ingredient is nauseating—it must be seasoned, it must be spiced, and before we can enjoy the eating of it to the fullest we must be forced to strive for it. War and work, the two most distasteful things in the world, are, nevertheless, the most essential to the happiness and the existence of a people. Peace reduces the necessity for labor, and induces slothfulness. War compels labor, that her ravages may be effaced. Peace turns us into fat worms. War makes men of us.

== Importance ==
Tarzan and the Ant Men marks the end of a sequence, essentially one continuing plot line, that began with Tarzan the Untamed and continued through Tarzan the Terrible and Tarzan and the Golden Lion.

The novel is also the last in the series to focus primarily on Tarzan's own affairs and to routinely feature the customary locales and supporting cast of the early novels. In later novels Burroughs largely dropped the use of such characters as Jane and Korak, as well as the familiar base of Tarzan's African estate. Formerly pivotal characters would return only occasionally; Jane, La of Opar and Paul d'Arnot would each reappear once, while the Waziri or Jad-bal-ja the golden lion would only be brought in as needed to get Tarzan out of a tight spot. The Ape Man would become a seemingly rootless adventurer intervening in the affairs of an endlessly changing gallery of secondary characters whose goals and entanglements were henceforth to form the basis of the novels' plots. This shift in plot-type had first been presaged by the introduction of strong secondary characters as early as Tarzan the Untamed; after Tarzan and the Ant Men it would become dominant.

== References in other literature ==
Tarzan and the Ant Men is referred to in Harper Lee's novel To Kill a Mockingbird (1960) as a book read by the young protagonist, Jean Louise ("Scout") Finch.

Tarzan and the Ant Men is also mentioned, along with other unspecified Tarzan titles, in Herman Wouk's A City Boy (1948), being read at Camp Manitou by Herbie Bookbinder, the tubby bookworm hero.

== Adaptations ==
The book has been adapted into comic form by Gold Key Comics in Tarzan nos. 174-175, dated June–July 1969, with a script by Gaylord DuBois and art by Russ Manning.

The novel also inspired a very similar plot line in the Filmation animated series Tarzan, Lord of the Jungle, second season (1977) episode 3, Tarzan and the Colossus of Zome.

Preceded by Tarzan and the Golden Lion	Tarzan series Tarzan and the Ant Men	Succeeded by Tarzan and the Tarzan Twins
