= Nita Martan =

American actress

- Born: July 4, 1898; Colorado, U.S.
- Died: June 1, 1986 (aged 87); Riverside, California, U.S.
- Other name: Manilla Martan
- Occupations: Actress; dancer; singer
- Years active: 1920–1931 (film)

Nita Martan (1898–1986) was an American actress, dancer, and singer who was active in the silent and early sound eras.

Martan was active in musical comedy productions in New York and in vaudeville. On Broadway, she portrayed Ro See in China Rose (1925) and Elaine Le Mar in When You Smile (1925).

In 1932, Martan and Murray Smith formed a dance team that was featured at venues such as the Ambassador Hotel's Coconut Grove in Los Angeles and the Embassy Club in Miami, Florida.

== Selected filmography ==
- The Son of Tarzan (1920) (credited as Manilla Martan)
- Sidewalks of New York (1922) (credited as Manilla Martan)
- The Wolf's Fangs (1923) (credited as Manilla Martans)
- Hereafter credited as Nita Martan:
- Lost at the Front (1927)
- The Royal American (1927)
- Dog Justice (1928)
- Lady Be Good (1928)
- Twin Beds (1929)
- Borrowed Wives (1930)
- Under Montana Skies (1930)
- Chasing Rainbows (1930)
- The Third Alarm (1930)
- Two Gun Man (1931)
- Anybody's Blonde (1931)
- Caught Cheating (1931)

== Bibliography ==
- Munden, Kenneth White. The American Film Institute Catalog of Motion Pictures Produced in the United States, Part 1. University of California Press, 1997.
