= Bunduki =

1975 novel by J. T. Edson

- Cover of first edition
- Author: J. T. Edson
- Language: English
- Series: Bunduki series
- Genre: Adventure
- Publisher: Corgi Books
- Publication date: April 1975
- Publication place: United Kingdom
- Media type: Print (paperback)
- Pages: 208
- ISBN: 0-552-09768-3
- Followed by: see article

Bunduki is a 1975 novel by English writer J. T. Edson, the first work in the Bunduki series that followed. The series involves characters related to Tarzan and was initially authorized by the estate of Edgar Rice Burroughs. In the opening of the novel the main protagonists are transported from Earth to Zillikian (see below).

== Novels and short stories ==
All of Edson's Bunduki stories were published in England by Corgi Books:

1. Edson, John Thomas (April 1975). Bunduki. DAW Books. ISBN 0-552-09768-3.
2. Edson, John Thomas (January 1976). Bunduki and Dawn. Corgi. ISBN 0-552-10061-7.
3. Edson, John Thomas (October 1976). Sacrifice for the Quagga God. Corgi. ISBN 0-552-10272-5.
4. Edson, John Thomas (June 1980). Fearless Master of the Jungle. Corgi. ISBN 0-552-11405-7.
5. Amazons of Zillikian (November 2023)

Short story prequels (set on Earth)

1. "The Mchawi's Powers" – Edson, John Thomas (March 1979). J.T.'s Hundredth. Corgi. ISBN 0-552-10995-9.
2. "Death to Simba Nyeuse" – Edson, John Thomas (February 1980). J.T.'s Ladies. Corgi. ISBN 0-552-11223-2.
3. "Accident – or Murder?" – Edson, John Thomas (February 1987). More J.T.'s Ladies. Corgi. ISBN 0-552-12899-6.
4. "A Good Time Was Had by All" – Edson, John Thomas (February 1990). Mark Counter's Kin. Corgi. ISBN 0-552-13541-0.

=== Publication ===
The first three novels were published with permission from both Edgar Rice Burroughs, Inc. and Philip José Farmer for the biographical connections between Edson's Bunduki & Dawn, Burroughs' Tarzan characters, and Farmer's Wold Newton family.

Sometime after 1976, ERB Inc. withdrew Edson's permission to use the Tarzan name in future volumes and as a result, the fourth novel and the short stories do not mention Tarzan or Jane by name.

In November 2023, Piccadilly Publishing published Amazons of Zillikian, an incomplete novel written by J. T. Edson.

== Zillikian ==
Zillikian is a counter-Earth planet (i.e. located at the L3 Lagrange point which is opposite the Sun in the same orbit as Earth). The planet is very similar to Earth in climate and wildlife, albeit without the industrialization of humans that Earth has.

== See also ==
- Tarzan Alive: A Definitive Biography of Lord Greystoke
- Tarzan (book series)
