= P. Dempsey Tabler =

American actor

- Born: Perce Dempsey Tabler; November 23, 1876; Tennessee, US
- Died: June 7, 1956 (aged 79); San Francisco, California

Perce Dempsey Tabler (November 23, 1876 – June 7, 1956) was a Tennessee-born opera singer, athlete, businessman and actor, remembered for being the third actor to portray Tarzan in films.

His sole outing in the role came in the 1920 movie serial The Son of Tarzan, based on the Edgar Rice Burroughs novel of the same name, which focused on Korak, the son of Tarzan and Jane.

Following The Son of Tarzan, Tabler made only one more film, 1923's Spawn of the Desert.
