= Tarzan the Terrible =

1921 novel by Edgar Rice Burroughs

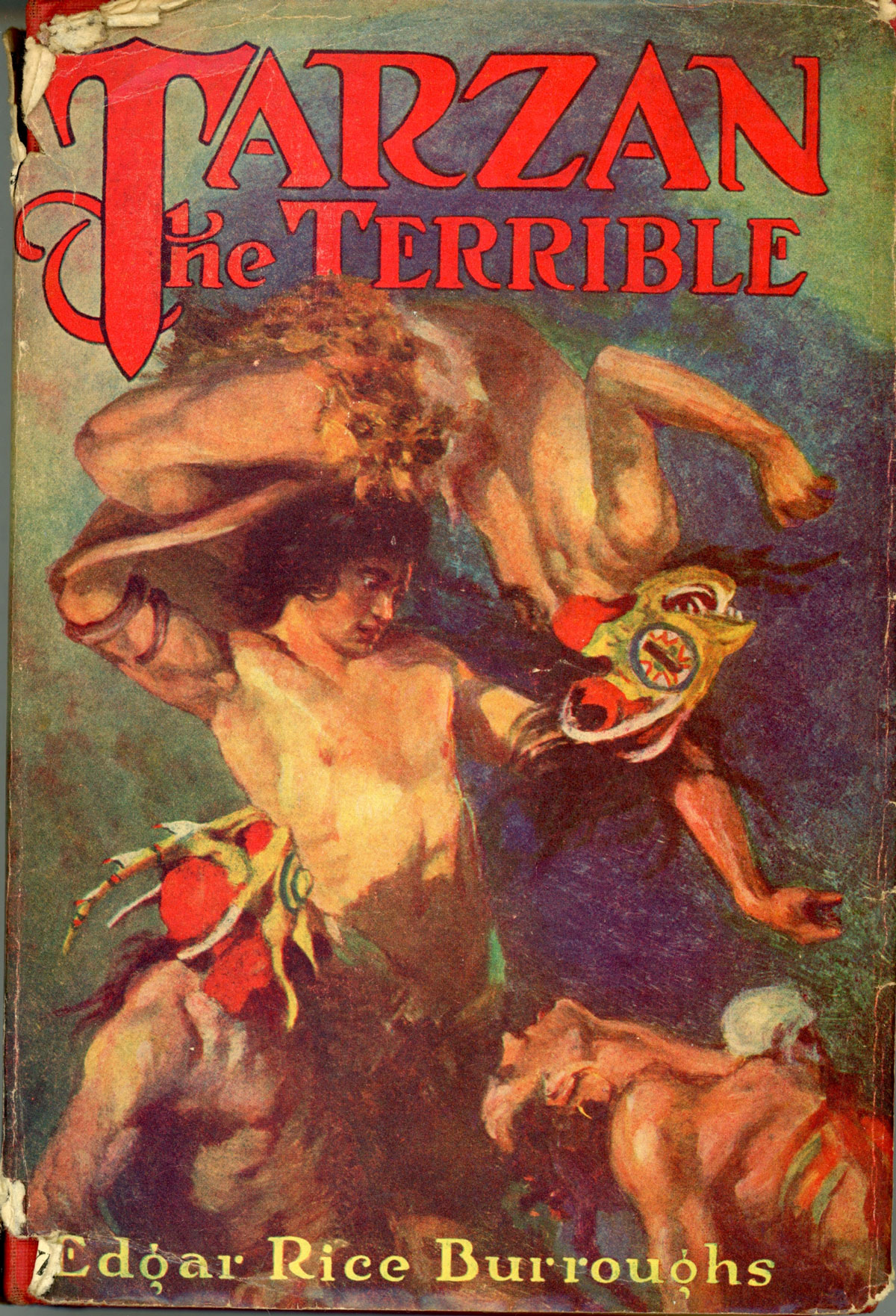
- Dust-jacket illustration of first edition.
- Author: Edgar Rice Burroughs
- Illustrator: J. Allen St. John
- Language: English
- Series: Tarzan series
- Genre: Adventure
- Publisher: A. C. McClurg
- Publication date: 1921
- Publication place: United States
- Media type: Print (hardback)
- Pages: 408
- Preceded by: Tarzan the Untamed
- Followed by: Tarzan and the Golden Lion
- Text: Tarzan the Terrible at Wikisource

Tarzan the Terrible is a novel by American writer Edgar Rice Burroughs, the eighth in his series of twenty-four books about the title character Tarzan. The story was first published as a serial in the pulp magazine Argosy All-Story Weekly in the issues for February 12, 19, and 26 and March 5, 12, 19, and 26, 1921; the first book edition was published in June 1921 by A. C. McClurg. Its setting, Pal-ul-don, is one of the more thoroughly realized "lost civilizations" in Burroughs' Tarzan stories. The novel contains a map of the place as well as a glossary of its inhabitants' language.

== Plot ==
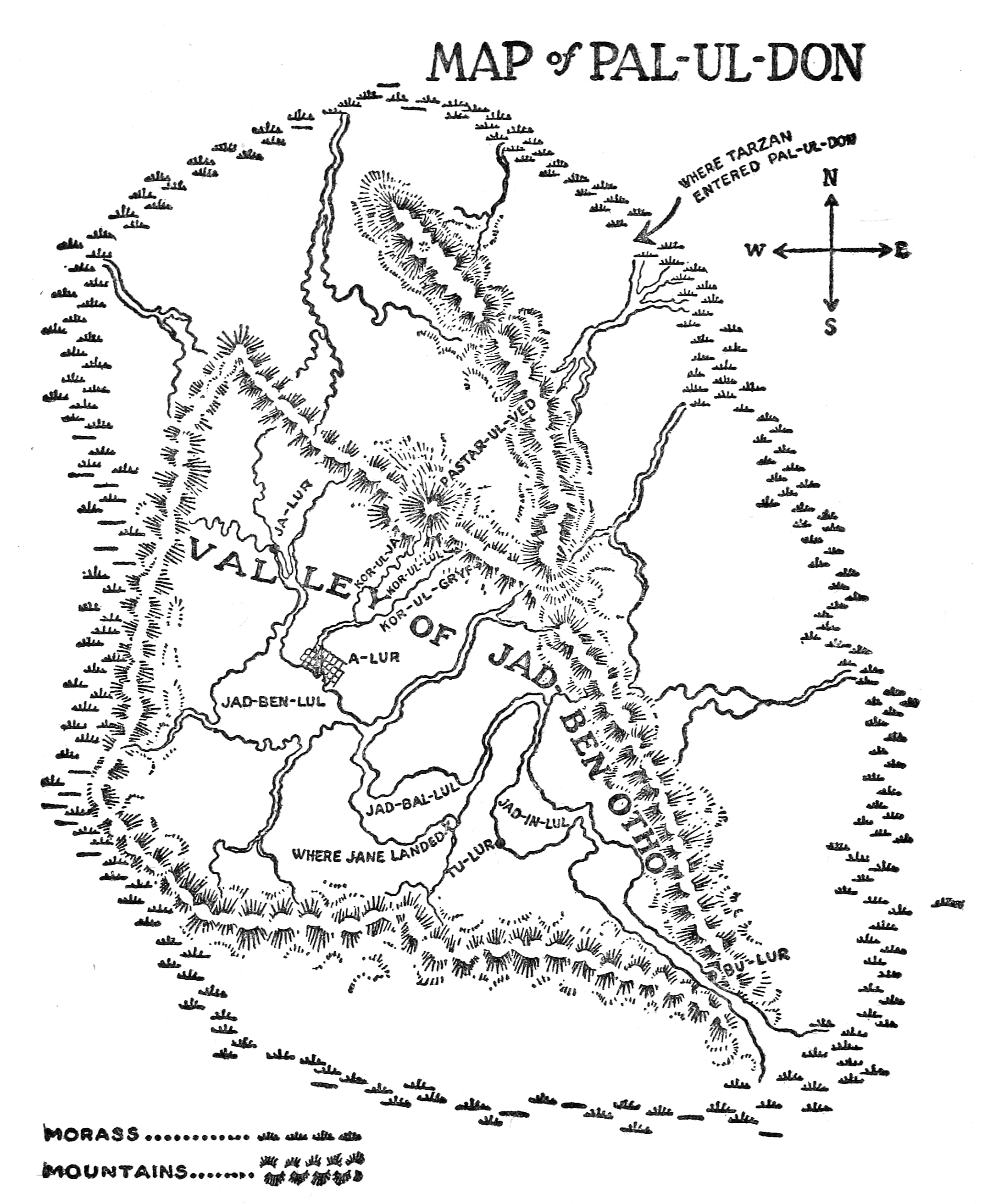
Map of Pal-ul-don from the first edition.

Two months have passed since the conclusion of the previous novel Tarzan the Untamed, in which Tarzan spent many months wandering about Africa wreaking vengeance upon those who he believed brutally murdered Jane. At the end of that novel, Tarzan learns that her death was a ruse and that she had not been killed at all.

In attempting to track Jane, Tarzan has come to a hidden valley called Pal-ul-don filled with dinosaurs: these include the savage Gryfs, omnivorous Triceratops standing 20 feet tall at the shoulder, with claws on their front legs and Stegosaurus-like plates on its back. The lost valley is also home to two different adversarial races of tailed human-looking creatures: the hairless and white-skinned, city-dwelling Ho-don and the hairy and black-skinned, hill-dwelling Waz-don. Tarzan befriends a Ho-don warrior and the Waz-don chief actuating some uncustomary relations. In this new world, Tarzan becomes a captive where he impresses his captors with his accomplishments and skills that they name him "Tarzan-Jad-Guru" (Tarzan the Terrible).

Jane is also being held captive in Pal-ul-don, having been brought there by her German captor. She becomes a centerpiece in a religious power struggle, until she escapes. Her German captor becomes dependent on her due to his own lack of jungle survival skills.

With the aid of his native allies, Tarzan continues to pursue his beloved, going through an extended series of fights and escapes to do so. In the end, success seems beyond even his ability to achieve until in the final chapter he and Jane are saved by their son Korak, who has been searching for Tarzan just as Tarzan has been searching for Jane.

== Adaptations ==
The book has been adapted into comic form by Gold Key Comics in Tarzan #166-167 (July–September 1968), with a script by Gaylord DuBois and art by Russ Manning.

Pal-ul-don appears in the Tarzan, Lord of the Jungle episode "Tarzan and the Beast in the Iron Mask".

Preceded by Tarzan the Untamed	Tarzan series Tarzan the Terrible	Succeeded by Tarzan and the Golden Lion
