= Gene Pollar =

American actor

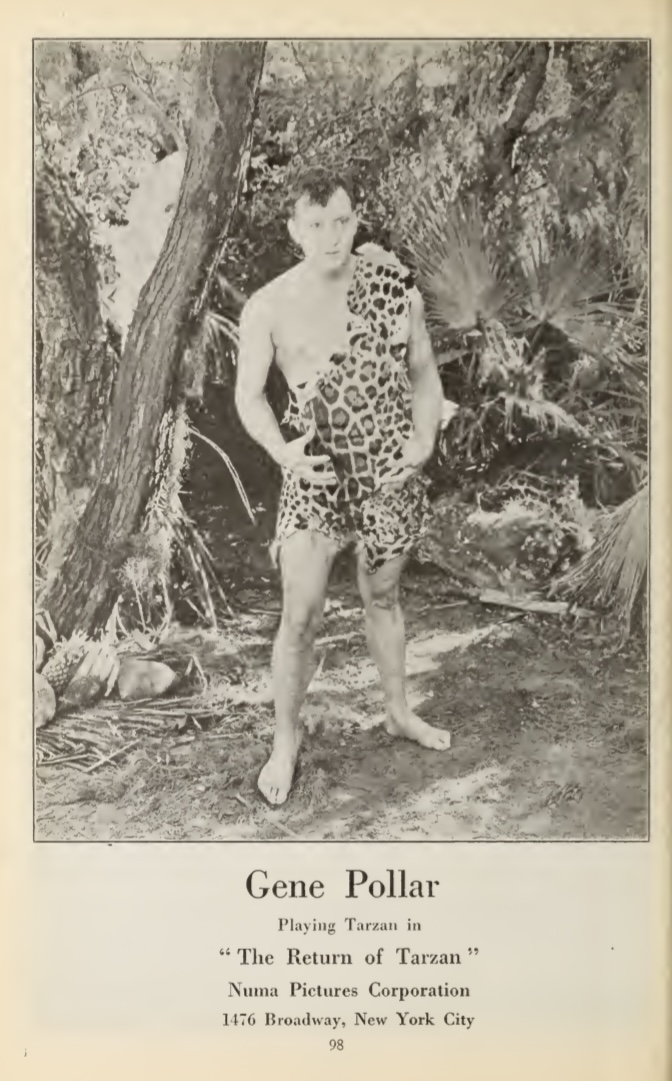
- Gene Pollar, Motion Picture Studio Directory (1920)
- Born: Joseph Charles Pohler; September 16, 1892; New York City, New York, U.S.
- Died: October 20, 1971 (aged 79); Fort Lauderdale, Florida, U.S.

Joseph Charles Pohler (September 16, 1892 - October 20, 1971), known by the screen name Gene Pollar, was a New York City firefighter who, in his very brief movie career, played Tarzan.

== Background ==
At age 28, the 6'2", 215-pound Pohler became the second actor to portray Tarzan in films. Elmo Lincoln, the first actor in the role, had made two Tarzan movies when Numa Pictures approached him about making a third. At the time, Lincoln was not interested (though he would later return to the role briefly). One of the Weiss Brothers, the low-budget filmmakers who controlled Numa, was on a visit to New York when he signed Pohler to play the apeman. Pohler was given the screen name Gene Pollar. The film was called The Return of Tarzan, based on Edgar Rice Burroughs' novel The Return of Tarzan.

== Production ==
Pollar was paid $100 per week. The production was sold to Goldwyn Distribution Corporation in April 1920. As a precautionary measure, since it featured a new star, the film was retitled The Revenge of Tarzan just two weeks prior to its opening on July 20, 1920. The film was a success, but Numa refused to release Pollar to accept a contract from Universal Pictures.

== Later life ==
The disgruntled Pollar ended his acting career and returned to firefighting under his original name, Joseph C. Pohler. In 1944, he became a purchasing agent for a retail store chain, for which he worked until his retirement to West Hollywood, Florida.

Pollar appeared as a contestant on the CBS television program, I've Got a Secret, on the February 16, 1955 episode.

Pollar emerged briefly from obscurity in 1966 at age 73. That year, a publicity event surrounding the premiere of NBC's Tarzan series brought together several actors who had played the apeman, and the guest of honor was James H. Pierce, then 66, who was dubbed the "oldest living Tarzan". Pollar contacted the media and declared correctly that he was the oldest. "Pierce is just a kid compared to me", he joked. Pollar blamed the mix-up on a New York City paper's erroneous report of his death a few years earlier.

Pollar died in 1971 in Fort Lauderdale, Florida, at age 79.
