= Russ Manning =

American cartoonist

- Self-portrait
- Born: Russell George Manning; January 5, 1929 Van Nuys, California
- Died: December 1, 1981 (aged 52) California
- Area: Penciller
- Notable works: Magnus, Robot Fighter; Tarzan comic strip Star Wars comic strip
- Awards: Will Eisner Award Hall of Fame, 2006

Russell George Manning (January 5, 1929 – December 1, 1981) was an American comic book artist who created the series Magnus, Robot Fighter and illustrated such newspaper comic strips as Tarzan and Star Wars. He was inducted into the Will Eisner Award Hall of Fame in 2006.

== Biography ==
Manning studied at the Los Angeles County Art Institute, and later, during his US Army service in Japan, drew cartoons for his military base newspaper.

In 1953 he went to work for Western Publishing and illustrated stories for the wide variety of comics published by Western for Dell Comics, and later for Western's own Gold Key Comics line. His first notable work was on Brothers of the Spear, a backup feature, created by Gaylord Du Bois, in the Tarzan comic book. He also drew a few Tarzan stories. He created Gold Key's Magnus, Robot Fighter and The Aliens (which ran in the back of the former) in 1963 and drew the first 21 issues, through 1968.

From 1965 to 1969, Manning drew Gold Key's Tarzan series. During this time, he adapted ten of the first eleven Tarzan novels written by Edgar Rice Burroughs, from scripts written by Gaylord Du Bois. (The adaptation of the sixth, Jungle Tales of Tarzan, also scripted by Du Bois, was drawn by Alberto Giolitti rather than Manning). In 1999 the first seven of these were reprinted in three graphic novels by Dark Horse Comics as Edgar Rice Burroughs' Tarzan of the Apes (Tarzan of the Apes, Return, Beasts, and Son of Tarzan), Edgar Rice Burroughs' Tarzan — The Jewels of Opar, and Edgar Rice Burroughs' Tarzan The Untamed (Tarzan the Untamed and Tarzan the Terrible). These were later reprinted by Dark Horse in one hardcover archive volume. Manning's remaining adaptations, not reprinted by Dark Horse, were Tarzan and the Golden Lion, Tarzan and the Ant Men and Tarzan, Lord of the Jungle. They did plan another hardcover archive album. He did not do the finished art on the latter, but provided lay-outs for parts of the story.

Manning also drew the Korak stories in the first 11 issues of Gold Key's Korak comic (also written by Du Bois). These were reprinted by Dark Horse Comics in 2 hardcover archive collections.

From 1967 to 1972 he drew the Tarzan daily newspaper comic strip and stayed on the Sunday page until 1979. He also created four original Tarzan graphic novels for European publication. Two of them were reprinted by Dark Horse Comics in a single trade paperback collection (Tarzan in The Land That Time Forgot and The Pool of Time) (ISBN 1-56971-151-8). During that same period he used assistants, among them William Stout, Rick Hoberg, Mike Royer, and Dave Stevens.

Magnus, his and Gold Key's best-known heroic-adventure series, was set in the year 4000, which Manning depicted as clean, airy city scapes populated by shiny robots, handsome men, and beautiful women. In an era when many science fiction illustrations still showed interstellar spaceships with fins reminiscent of World War II V-2 rockets, Manning offered more exotic craft. His Magnus work was later collected by Dark Horse Comics in three hardcover "archive" editions using a different color palette. Dark Horse then reprinted them in three trade paperbacks.

His final major work was writing and drawing the Star Wars newspaper strip in 1979-80. These were collected by Dark Horse Comics as Classic Star Wars: The Early Adventures (ISBN 1-56971-178-X), which omitted the fact that Manning only drew some of the episodes that were written by Steve Gerber and Archie Goodwin.

Russ Manning died of cancer on December 1, 1981, while still living in California where he was born. He was 52.

The Russ Manning Most Promising Newcomer Award, which is presented annually at San Diego Comic-Con during the Eisner Awards, is named after him.

== See also ==
- Russ Manning Award
