= Canaveral Press =

American publisher (1962–1975)

- Parent company: Biblo and Tannen
- Status: Defunct
- Country of origin: United States
- Headquarters location: New York City
- Key people: Editor: Richard A. Lupoff
- Publication types: Books
- Fiction genres: Fantasy, science fiction

Canaveral Press was a New York–based publisher of fantasy, science fiction and related material, active from the early 1960s through the mid-1970s. It was an imprint of Biblo and Tannen, a publishing house founded in New York City by Jack Biblo and Jack Tannen. Through its entire existence, Richard A. Lupoff was the editor for Canaveral Press.

After many years of operating their lower Manhattan bookstore, Biblo and Tannen Booksellers, at 63 Fourth Avenue, the two founded Biblo and Tannen to republish out-of-print historical novels that were purchased mainly by school libraries. They also reprinted books on archaeology, including Arthur Evans's The Palace of Minos at Knossos.

== Reprints ==
They launched another subsidiary, Canaveral Press, giving it a name identified with space exploration underway at Cape Canaveral, Florida. Under that imprint, Biblo and Tannen published a line of Burroughs books. Most were reprints of Edgar Rice Burroughs novels on which the copyright had lapsed, but in April 1963, the firm acquired the rights to unpublished Burroughs manuscripts.

Canaveral was on good terms with the Burroughs heirs, and several Canaveral Burroughs titles are legitimate first editions of material not previously published in book form and in some cases not previously published at all. To illustrate the Burroughs novels, Lupoff brought into Canaveral several leading illustrators of the 1950s and 1960s, notably Reed Crandall, Frank Frazetta and Roy G. Krenkel.

== Original books ==
Canaveral also published original books by Lupoff, E. E. Doc Smith, L. Sprague de Camp and Catherine Crook de Camp. Lupoff recalled, "After assembling a couple of volumes of Burroughs' previously uncollected short stories and preparing several of his unpublished novels for release, I was asked by the owners of the company, Jack Biblo and Jack Tannen, to write a book about him. That was the genesis of Edgar Rice Burroughs: Master of Adventure, my first book."

Canaveral stopped adding titles to its catalog in the late 1960s. Some of its existing titles were reprinted in the 1970s. The firm closed in the late 1970s.

== Canaveral Press bibliography ==
- A Fighting Man of Mars, by Edgar Rice Burroughs (illus by Mahlon Blaine, 1962, reprinted 1974)
- The Moon Men, by Edgar Rice Burroughs (illus by Mahlon Blaine, 1962, reprinted 1975)
- The Monster Men, by Edgar Rice Burroughs (illus by Mahlon Blaine, 1962)
- The Land That Time Forgot, by Edgar Rice Burroughs (illus by Mahlon Blaine, 1962)
- Tanar of Pellucidar, by Edgar Rice Burroughs (illus by Mahlon Blaine, 1962)
- At the Earth's Core, by Edgar Rice Burroughs (illus by Mahlon Blaine, 1962)
- Pellucidar, by Edgar Rice Burroughs (illus by Mahlon Blaine, 1962)
- Pirates of Venus, by Edgar Rice Burroughs (illus by J. Allen St. John, 1962)
- The Cave Girl, by Edgar Rice Burroughs (illus by Roy G. Krenkel, 1962)
- Tarzan at the Earth's Core, by Edgar Rice Burroughs (illus by Frank Frazetta, 1962, reprinted 1974)
- The Gods of Mars, by Edgar Rice Burroughs (illus by Larry Ivie, 1962)
- Back to the Stone Age, by Edgar Rice Burroughs (dust jacket by Sam Sigaloff and seven plates by John Coleman Burroughs, 1963)
- Escape on Venus, by Edgar Rice Burroughs (dust jacket by Sam Sigaloff and five internal illustrations by John Coleman Burroughs, 1963, reprinted 1975)
- The Mucker, by Edgar Rice Burroughs (illus by J. Allen St. John, 1963)
- Carson of Venus, by Edgar Rice Burroughs (illus by J. Allen St. John, 1963)
- Lost on Venus, by Edgar Rice Burroughs (illus by J. Allen St. John, 1963)
- Land of Terror, by Edgar Rice Burroughs (illus by Roy G. Krenkel, 1963)
- Savage Pellucidar, by Edgar Rice Burroughs (illus by J. Allen St. John, 1963)
- Tarzan and the Tarzan Twins, by Edgar Rice Burroughs (illus by Roy G. Krenkel, 1963, combines The Tarzan Twins and Tarzan and the Tarzan Twins with Jad-Bel-Ja the Golden Lion)
- The Lad and the Lion, by Edgar Rice Burroughs (illus by John Coleman Burroughs, 1964)
- John Carter of Mars, by Edgar Rice Burroughs (illus by Reed Crandall, 1964)
- Tales of Three Planets, by Edgar Rice Burroughs (illus by Roy G. Krenkel, 1964)
- Tarzan and the Madman, by Edgar Rice Burroughs (illus by Reed Crandall, 1964)
- Tarzan and the Castaways, by Edgar Rice Burroughs (illus by Frank Frazetta, 1964 reprinted 1975)
- Subspace Explorers, by Edward E. Smith (illus by Roy G. Krenkel, 1965)
- Edgar Rice Burroughs: Master of Adventure, by Richard A. Lupoff (1965)
- Spirits, Stars, and Spells: the Profits and Perils of Magic, by L. Sprague de Camp and Catherine Crook de Camp (1966)

== Sources ==
- Chalker, Jack L.; Mark Owings (1998). The Science-Fantasy Publishers: A Bibliographic History, 1923-1998. Westminster, MD and Baltimore: Mirage Press, Ltd. pp. 131–134.
- Roy G. Krenkel
- Frank Frazetta
- Reed Crandall
- Library of Congress
