= Mahars of Pellucidar =

1976 novel by John Eric Holmes

- Cover art from Mahars of Pellucidar
- Author: John Eric Holmes
- Cover artist: Boris Vallejo
- Language: English
- Series: Pellucidar
- Genre: Science fiction
- Publisher: Ace Books
- Publication date: 1976
- Publication place: United States
- Media type: Print (Paperback)
- Preceded by: Savage Pellucidar
- Followed by: Red Axe of Pellucidar

Mahars of Pellucidar is a novel by American writer John Eric Holmes. The first of his Pellucidar pastiches, it was first published by Ace Books in 1976 and reissued by Edgar Rice Burroughs, Inc., in 2022.

Set in Edgar Rice Burroughs' imaginary interior world of Pellucidar, the book features a species of intelligent flying reptiles (Mahars) invented by Burroughs in his first Pellucidar novel, At the Earth's Core. Holmes' human protagonist, Christopher West, was named in honor of his own son, Christopher West Holmes.

== Plot ==
West is an associate of Dr. Kinsley, who has developed a teleportation beam that can also see events taking place 200 miles below the surface. When they see people about to sacrifice a beautiful woman, Christopher obtains a pocket knife and a red fire axe and has himself beamed down to rescue the woman. Due to his unusual weapon, West becomes known as Red Axe among the stone-age human beings of Pellucidar. The story deals with West's efforts to free his new-found friends from the tyranny of the Mahars.

The region visited by West is apparently an area of Pellucidar different from that in which Burroughs set his stories, from which the Mahars were driven at the end of the second book in the series, Pellucidar. Evidently there are other locales in which the reptiles are dominant. Therefore, West never runs into any of Burrough's human Pellucidarian characters, such as David Innes, Abner Perry, Dian the Beautiful, Ghak the Hairy One, or any of the others.

== Sequel ==
John Eric Holmes wrote a sequel to Mahars of Pellucidar called Red Axe of Pellucidar, the publication of which was blocked by the Burroughs estate, despite its previous authorization of Mahars. Ready for print in 1980, it only saw publication much later in a limited private edition issued in 1993. Both of Holmes's Pellucidar novels were ultimately officially re-released by Edgar Rice Burroughs, Inc. in 2022 in hardcover, paperback, Kindle, and audio CD as part of its Edgar Rice Burroughs Universe series. A planned third book, to be called Swordsmen of Pellucidar, was never written.
