= Master of Adventure: The Worlds of Edgar Rice Burroughs =

Book by Richard A. Lupoff

- Cover of the first edition, titled Edgar Rice Burroughs: Master of Adventure
- Author: Richard A. Lupoff
- Original title: Edgar Rice Burroughs: Master of Adventure
- Illustrator: Al Williamson, Reed Crandall, and Frank Frazetta
- Cover artist: Frank Frazetta (2nd & 3rd eds.); Al Williamson and Reed Crandall (4th ed.)
- Language: English
- Publisher: Canaveral Press (1st ed.); Ace Books (2nd & 3rd eds.); Bison Books (4th ed.); SF Gateway (ebook)
- Publication date: 1965 (1st ed.); 1968 (2nd ed.); 1975 (3rd ed.); 2005 (4th ed.); 2015 (ebook)
- Publication place: U.S.A.
- Pages: 294 pp. (1st ed.); 315 pp. (2nd & 3rd eds.); 307 (4th ed.)
- ISBN: 0-8032-8030-0 (4th ed.)

Master of Adventure: The Worlds of Edgar Rice Burroughs is a book by Richard A. Lupoff that explores the work of Edgar Rice Burroughs, the creator of Tarzan and author of numerous science-fiction, fantasy, and adventure novels. The book is one of the few major works of criticism covering the work of Burroughs, and it helped create renewed interest in his work during the 1960s.

== Publication history ==
The book was first published in hardcover by Canaveral Press in 1965 under the title Edgar Rice Burroughs: Master of Adventure. It includes a preface by Henry Hardy Heins and 12 black-and-white illustrations, including four by Al Williamson and Reed Crandall, two by Crandall alone, and six by Frank Frazetta; these materials appear in all four print editions.

Cover of second (1st Ace Books) edition, 1968

A revised and enlarged second edition with a new introduction by the author was published in paperback by Ace Books in 1968. It featured cover art by Frank Frazetta recycled from the publisher's earlier edition of Burroughs's The Beasts of Tarzan

A third "centennial" edition, adding a new introduction by the author and also in paperback, followed, also from Ace, in 1975. It also featured cover art by Frazetta, in this instance a new work.

Cover of fourth (Bison Books) edition, 2005

A fourth edition, again revised and enlarged with new content, was published as a trade paperback by Bison Books in 2005. For this edition, the work was retitled Master of Adventure: The Worlds of Edgar Rice Burroughs. New content includes a foreword by fantasy author Michael Moorcock, an admirer of Burroughs's work, a new foreword by the author, and an essay by Phillip R. Burger, a consultant to Burroughs. The cover illustration was a colorized version of the frontispiece common to all the print editions, "Edgar Rice Burroughs and His Most Famous Creations" by Al Williamson and Reed Crandall.

An ebook of the centennial (third) edition retaining the original title was published by Gollancz's SF Gateway imprint in 2015.

== Content ==
After a brief survey of Burroughs's life prior to his literary career, the book discusses his writings in two broad sequences, the first devoted to his main body of work aside from that devoted to Tarzan, and the second specifically to the Tarzan books. Treatment in each sequence is broadly chronological, but with groups of related works treated topically. For instance, chapters 3, 5, and 9 are devoted to Burroughs's Mars series, chapters 4 and 6 to his Pellucidar series, chapter 7 to The Land that Time Forgot and The Moon Maid, which Lupoff considers some of Burroughs's masterworks, and chapter 10 to the Venus series, with miscellaneous works covered primarily in chapters 4, 8, and 11.

The Tarzan chapters cover the ape-man's early, middle, and late adventures (in chapters 12-14, 16, and 17, respectively), interspersed with material on the character's literary antecedents (chapter 15) and descendants (chapter 18).

Two additional chapters round out the work by assembling a recommended reading list of essential Burroughs novels (chapter 19), notable for its placement of the relatively obscure Burroughs novels The War Chief and The Mucker at third and fourth place, respectively, and surveying works not published during Burroughs's lifetime (chapter 20), many of which remained unpublished at the time Lupoff initially wrote. (Almost all have since been printed).

The book includes outlines for all of Burroughs's major novels, and covers several aspects of his body of work, including influences upon his work, works influenced by Burroughs, and later works by Burroughs that never came to fruition due to his service in World War II as a war correspondent and declining health later in life.

== Table of Contents ==
- Preface by Henry Hardy Heins
- Introduction to the Centennial Edition
- Introduction to the Second Edition
- I: Who Was Edgar Rice Burroughs?
- II: The Beginning of a Career
- III: A Phoenician on Mars
- IV: To the Earth's Core—and Elsewhere
- V: Barsoom Resumed
- VI: The Return to Pellucidar
- VII: Wieroos and Kalkars
- VIII: The Good Pot-Boilers
- IX: Barsoom Concluded
- X: Wrong-Way Carson
- XI: The Last Hero
- XII: The Backs of Old Letterheads
- XIII: Tarzan Returns
- XIV: And Returns and Returns
- XV: Ancestors of Tarzan
- XVI: Tarzan's Greatest Adventures
- XVII: Last Tales of Tarzan
- XVIII: Descendants of Tarzan
- XIX: A Basic Burroughs Library
- XX: The Surprise in the Safe
- XXI: Forty More Years of Adventure (by Phillip R. Burger; 4th edition only)

== Reception ==
While the response to the book has been generally favorable, it remains controversial among some Burroughs aficionados, particularly for Lupoff's argument that the Barsoom series was heavily influenced by Lieut. Gullivar Jones: His Vacation (1905) and The Wonderful Adventures of Phra the Phoenician (1890) by Edwin L. Arnold.
