= Tales of Three Planets =

- cover art from first edition
- Author: Edgar Rice Burroughs
- Cover artist: Roy G. Krenkel
- Language: English
- Publisher: Canaveral Press
- Publication date: 1964
- Publication place: United States
- Media type: Print (hardcover)
- Pages: 283

Tales of Three Planets is a posthumous collection of short stories by American writer Edgar Rice Burroughs, with an introduction by Richard A. Lupoff and illustrations by Roy G. Krenkel. It was first published in hardcover in 1964 by Canaveral Press, and has been reprinted once since.

The book collects four novelettes by Burroughs, one set on Earth, two set on the distant planet Poloda "beyond the farthest star," and one set on Venus. Two of its pieces, "The Resurrection of Jimber-Jaw" and "Beyond the Farthest Star", had previously seen magazine publication; the former in Argosy Weekly for February 20, 1937 and the latter in Blue Book Magazine for January 1942; the others were published for the first time in the collection.

== Contents ==
- "Introduction" (Richard A. Lupoff)
- "The Resurrection of Jimber-Jaw" (1937)
- "Beyond the Farthest Star" (1942)
- "Tangor Returns" (1964)
- "The Wizard of Venus" (1941)
