= At the Earth's Core =

At the Earth's Core may refer to:

- At the Earth's Core (novel) (1914), by Edgar Rice Burroughs
- At the Earth's Core (film) (1976)
