= David Innes =

- Pellucidar character
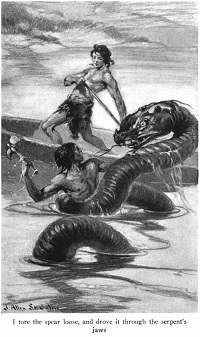
- J. Allen St. John's illustration of David Innes rescuing Ja the Mezop in At the Earth's Core (1922).
- First appearance: At the Earth's Core
- Created by: Edgar Rice Burroughs

In-universe information
- Gender: Male
- Nationality: American

David Innes is a fictional character created by Edgar Rice Burroughs as the protagonist of his Pellucidar novels. The Innes character was introduced in At the Earth's Core, first serialized in four parts in All-Story Weekly in April 1914, then issued as a hardcover book by A. C. McClurg in July 1922.

== Associated novels ==
=== The early novels ===
David Innes is introduced in the first Pellucidar novel, At the Earth's Core, as a mining heir who finances the experimental "iron mole," an excavating vehicle designed by his elderly inventor friend Abner Perry. In a test run, they discover the vehicle cannot be turned, and it burrows 500 miles into the Earth's crust, emerging into the unknown interior world of Pellucidar. In Burroughs' concept, the Earth is a hollow shell with Pellucidar as the internal surface of that shell. It is inhabited by prehistoric creatures of all geological eras, and dominated by the Mahars, a species of flying reptile both intelligent and civilized, but which enslaves and preys on the local stone-age humans. Innes and Perry are enslaved by the Mahars' ape-like Sagoth servants and eventually lead a revolt of humankind. To further the struggle Innes travels in the iron mole back to the surface world at the end of the first novel to procure outer world technology.

Innes returns to the inner world in the second novel, Pellucidar. With the aid of the resources he brings the human revolt succeeds. In the course of the two books Innes wins the love of the cave-woman Dian the Beautiful, defeating rival suitors Jubal the Ugly One and Hooja the Sly One. Finally Innes and Perry succeed in building a confederacy of human tribes into an "Empire of Pellucidar" that wipes out the Mahar cities and establishes a new human civilization in their place.

=== The middle novels ===
The books after the first two show Innes' new empire as a relatively small entity in a world by and large still primitive and savage, and even his own subjects as little affected or changed by the trappings of civilization. Innes himself appears a somewhat hapless figure, brave and resourceful, yet ultimately dependent on the superior survival skills of his friends.

Years after his initial adventures, as the surface world measures time, Innes confronts a new threat, the Korsars, a nation of pirates descended from corsairs of the outer world, who had entered Pellucidar generations before through a natural polar opening connecting the outer and inner worlds. The tale is the subject of the third novel, Tanar of Pellucidar, told by his native friend Tanar and relayed to the surface by Perry via radio. The adventure ends with Innes a captive of the Korsars. He is a secondary character in this novel, and a minor one in the two that follow. In response to Perry's plea, an outer world expedition is launched to rescue Innes, in which Burrough's jungle hero Tarzan plays a major role. The rescue effort is the subject of the fourth novel, Tarzan at the Earth's Core, with Tarzan entering Pellucidar in an airship via the polar opening and eventually succeeding in rescuing Innes. The fifth novel, Back to the Stone Age, details the adventures of a lost expedition member, ultimately located by the liberated Innes.

=== The late novels ===
The Sixth novel, Land of Terror, returns Innes to the central role, relating his adventures during his return from his search mission to Sari, the capital of his empire. Savage Pellucidar, the final book in the series, presents a new sequence of adventures for Innes, Perry, and Dian, in which a hitherto unknown native Bronze Age civilization is discovered.

== In other media ==
- Actor Doug McClure portrayed David Innes in the 1976 film At the Earth's Core, based on the first Pellucidar novel.
- David Innes has also appeared in a comic strip and comic book series based on the novels, as well as the Tarzan comic strip.
