= Tarzan at the Earth's Core =

1930 novel by Edgar Rice Burroughs

- Dust-jacket illustration of Tarzan at the Earth's Core
- Author: Edgar Rice Burroughs
- Illustrator: J. Allen St. John
- Language: English
- Series: Tarzan series Pellucidar series
- Genre: Adventure
- Publisher: Metropolitan Books
- Publication date: 1929-1930
- Publication place: United States
- Media type: Print (hardback)
- Pages: 301
- Preceded by: Tarzan and the Lost Empire; Tanar of Pellucidar
- Followed by: Tarzan the Invincible; Back to the Stone Age

Tarzan at the Earth's Core is a novel by American writer Edgar Rice Burroughs, serialized in September 1929 to March 1930, the thirteenth in his series of twenty-four books about the title character Tarzan and the fourth in his series set in the interior world of Pellucidar.

== Plot summary ==
In response to a radio plea from Abner Perry, a scientist who, with his friend David Innes, has discovered the interior world of Pellucidar at the Earth's core, Jason Gridley launches an expedition to rescue Innes from the Korsars (corsairs), the scourge of the internal seas. He enlists Tarzan, and a fabulous airship is constructed to penetrate Pellucidar via the natural polar opening connecting the outer and inner worlds. The airship is crewed primarily by Germans, with Tarzan's Waziri warriors under their chief Muviro also along for the expedition.

In Pellucidar Tarzan and Gridley are each separated from the main force of the expedition and must struggle for survival against the prehistoric creatures and peoples of the inner world. Gridley wins the love of the native cave-woman Jana, the Red Flower of Zoram. Eventually everyone is reunited, and the party succeeds in rescuing Innes.

As Tarzan and the others prepare to return home, Gridley decides to stay to search for Frederich Wilhelm Eric von Mendeldorf und von Horst, one last member of the expedition who remains lost (The missing von Horst's adventures are told in a sequel, Back to the Stone Age, which does not involve either Gridley or Tarzan).

== Adaptations ==
The book has been adapted into comic form by Gold Key Comics in Tarzan nos. 179-181, dated November 1969-January 1970, with a script by Gaylord DuBois and art by Doug Wildey.

The novel also inspired the setting of an episode of the Saturday morning Filmation animation series Tarzan, Lord of the Jungle – first season (1976), episode 12, "Tarzan at the Earth's Core".

== See also ==
- 1930 in science fiction

Preceded by Tarzan and the Lost Empire	Tarzan series Tarzan at the Earth's Core	Succeeded by Tarzan the Invincible
Preceded by Tanar of Pellucidar	Pellucidar series Tarzan at the Earth's Core	Succeeded by Back to the Stone Age
