= John Eric Holmes =

American novelist

- Born: February 16, 1930; South Dakota, US
- Died: March 20, 2010 (aged 80)
- Resting place: National Memorial Cemetery of the Pacific
- Occupations: Educator, author
- Relatives: Wilfred Holmes, Isabelle West Holmes
- Writing career
- Genres: Non-fiction, fantasy, science fiction
- Notable work: Dungeons & Dragons Basic Set

John Eric Holmes (February 16, 1930 – March 20, 2010) was an American professor of neurology and writer of non-fiction, fantasy and science fiction. His writings appeared under his full name and under variants such as Eric Holmes and J. Eric Holmes and the pen name Sidney Leland.

== Life ==
Holmes was the son of US Navy officer Wilfred "Jasper" Holmes and his wife Isabelle West Holmes. Wilfred Holmes was also a writer of adventure stories under the pen name Alec Hudson. Like his father, John Eric Holmes also served in the armed forces, as a first lieutenant in the Marine Corps. He fought for two years in Korea. He was a medical doctor and an associate professor of neurology at the University of Southern California School of Medicine. He had a son named Christopher West Holmes.

== Writing career ==
Mahars of Pellucidar by John Eric Holmes, Ace Books, 1976, cover art by Boris Vallejo.

Holmes was a long-time science fiction fan, particularly of the works of Edgar Rice Burroughs and H. P. Lovecraft, and an enthusiast of fantasy role-playing games. His writings reflected both his chosen profession and his hobbies, beginning with an early short story published in 1951 and factual articles on neurology for the science fiction magazine Astounding and its successor Analog in the early 1960s.

He later wrote on Dungeons & Dragons, from the perspectives of both a Dungeon Master and an authority on the psychology of gaming, serving as editor of the Dungeons & Dragons Basic Set RPG rule book, and writing a series of fantasies set in a D&D-influenced world, including four short stories and one novel. These stories, along with a previously unpublished story, were collected in 2017 into the book Tales of Peril: the Complete Boinger & Zereth Stories of John Eric Holmes, edited by Allan T. Grohe Jr and published by Black Blade Publishing.

Holmes made an offer to TSR to develop an introductory version of Dungeons & Dragons, hoping to expand the game's demographics from college-age players to younger players and also try to get the game into the mass market. His resulting Dungeons & Dragons Basic Set (1977) was a revision of the original Dungeons & Dragons by Gary Gygax and Dave Arneson, as well as the game's early supplements, Greyhawk, Blackmoor, and Eldritch Wizardry. Holmes created the wereshark monster for Dungeons & Dragons, first publishing it in Alarums & Excursions #13 (July 1976).

Taking his writing more "mainstream," he wrote with David F. Lindsley the textbook Basic Human Neurophysiology (1984), and on his own pastiche speculative fiction novels set in the inner world of Edgar Rice Burroughs's Pellucidar, the fictional future of Philip Francis Nowlan's Buck Rogers, and the fictional past of Robert E. Howard's Conan the Barbarian.

Holmes's two Pellucidar novels were Mahars of Pellucidar, authorized by the Burroughs estate, and Red Axe of Pellucidar, reportedly blocked by the same authority. Ready for publication in 1980, it initially only saw print thirteen years later in a private printing. Both novels were ultimately officially re-released by Edgar Rice Burroughs, Inc. in 2022 in hardcover, paperback, Kindle, and audio CD as part of its Edgar Rice Burroughs Universe series. A planned third novel in the series, Swordsmen of Pellucidar, remained unfinished.

His other pastiches also met with mixed success. While Mordred, his Buck Rogers novel, saw print, his Conan novel, while contracted and paid for by Tor Books, was ultimately rejected. Another novel, Danton Doring, a collaboration with Burroughs' son John Coleman Burroughs, whom he helped treat for Parkinson's disease, was never completed.

Holmes was a regular guest at Burroughs fan conventions such as the Edgar Rice Burroughs Chain of Friendship (ECOF). He received its Lifetime Achievement Award for his Burroughs pastiches at ECOF '93 in Willows, California. He was slated to appear as Guest of Honor at 2004's ECOF Convention in Sacramento, California, but suffered a stroke and was unable to attend. He was a special guest at the June 2005 ECOF in Portland, Oregon.

== Bibliography ==
=== Fiction ===
==== Boinger the Halfling and Zereth the Elf ====
The stories published in Alarums & Excursions (A&E), included illustrations by Chris Holmes:

- “Warrior-for-Hire” in A&E #11, p. 2 (May 1976)
- “Were-shark” in A&E #13, pp. 3–4 (July 1976)
- “The Adventure of the Giant Chameleon” in A&E #14, pp. 4–7 (Aug. 1976)
- “The Adventure of the Lost City: Part One” in A&E #17, pp. 8–13 (Dec. 1976)
- “The Sorcerer’s Tower: Adventure of the Lost City: Part Two” in A&E #19, pp. 8–12 (Feb. 1977)
- “Trollshead” in The Dragon, #31, pp. 3, 40–44 (Nov. 1979)
- “The Sorcerer’s Jewel” in Dragon, #46, pp. 6–9, 60–65 (Feb. 1981)
- “In the Bag” in Dragon, #58, p. 36–38, 43–46 (Feb. 1982)
- The Maze of Peril (ISBN 0-917053-05-2) (Nov. 1986)
- Tales of Peril: the Complete Boinger and Zereth Stories of John Eric Holmes (ISBN 978-0-9842870-7-9) (June 2017) (includes the previously unpublished story "Witch Doctor", written with Chris Holmes)

==== Pellucidar ====
- Mahars of Pellucidar (ISBN 0-441-51590-8) (1976)
- Red Axe of Pellucidar (1993 – privately printed)
- Swordsmen of Pellucidar (unfinished)

==== Buck Rogers ====
- Mordred (ISBN 0-441-54220-4) (1980)

==== Other ====
- "Beachhead on the Moon," in Blue Book, v. 92, no. 4 (Feb. 1951)
- "The Cenote," in Doppelganger, no. 8 (1987)
- "Martian Twilight", Running Dinosaur Press (1991) (short story published as a stand-alone zine)
- Danton Doring (with John Coleman Burroughs) (unfinished)
- Conan on the River of Doom (unfinished)

=== Nonfiction ===
- “Brain Waves and Thought Patterns” in Analog Science Fact -> Science Fiction, v. 69, no. 5 (Jul. 1962)
- “The Educated Flatworms” in Analog Science Fact -> Science Fiction, v. 70, no. 3 (Nov. 1962)
- “The Split Brain” in Analog Science Fiction/Science Fact, v. 93, no. 6 (Aug. 1974)
- “Letter” (about Pellucidar creatures in OD&D) in Alarums and Excursions, #18, pp. 2–3 (Jan. 1977)
- “Notes on ‘A Page from the Verdigris Testament’” (with Steve Marsh) in Alarums & Excursions, #24, p. 2 (July 1977)
- Dungeons & Dragons Basic Set Rules, Editor and co-creator (July 1977)
- “The Lovecraftian Mythos in Dungeons & Dragons” (with Rob Kuntz) in The Dragon, #12, pp. 18, 20–21 (Feb. 1978)
- “A Rebuttal to 'The Cthulhu Mythos Revisted' by Gerald Guinn” in The Dragon, #16, p. 3 (May 1978)
- “Lost Civilizations: A Fantasy Supplement for Source of the Nile” in The Dragon, #24, pp. 5–6 (Apr. 1979)
- “The Psychopathology of Wargamers: Shrinks and Simulations” in The Space Gamer, no. 26, pp. 5– (Jan.–Feb. 1980)
- “Confessions of a Dungeon Master” in Psychology Today, v. 14, no. 6 (Nov. 1980)
- Fantasy Role Playing Games (ISBN 0-88254-514-0) (1981)
- “Dungeons & Dragons: Dangerous For Your Health?” in Beyond, Winter 1982, pp. 14–?
- “Basic D&D® points of view…” in Dragon, #52, pp. 14, 16–17 (Aug. 1981)
- “It is not dead which can eternal lie…: Call of Cthulhu review” in Gameplay, #1, pp. 62– (Feb. 1983)
- “DeKoven’s Different Designs review” in Gameplay, #6 (July 1983)
- Basic Human Neurophysiology (ISBN 0-444-00797-0) (with David F. Lindsley) (1984)
- “Mail-Call of Machen Society Cthulhu Meeting” in Crypt of Cthulhu, v. 7, no. 7 (1988)
- “Lovecraft in the Comic Books: an Update” in Crypt of Cthulhu, v. 17, no. 1 (1997)
- Holmes ’77 OD&D (2013)
