= Spirits, Stars, and Spells =

1966 history book by L. Sprague de Camp and Catherine Crook de Camp

- Dust-jacket cover
- Authors: L. Sprague de Camp and Catherine Crook de Camp
- Language: English
- Subjects: Magic, occultism
- Publisher: Canaveral Press
- Publication date: 1966
- Publication place: United States
- Media type: Print (Hardback)
- Pages: 348

Spirits, Stars, and Spells: The Profits and Perils of Magic is a 1966 history book by L. Sprague de Camp and Catherine Crook de Camp, published by Canaveral Press. The book sold slowly, and the remaining stock was taken over by Owlswick Press and sold under its own name with new dust jackets in 1980. It has been translated into Polish.

== Summary ==
The book constitutes a history of magic and occultism, a study of their practices, and a debunking of the subject in general.

== Reception ==
P. Schuyler Miller, reviewing the work in Analog Science Fiction / Science Fact, notes that "[t]he subtitle of this book explains its content well enough," calling it "a running account of the wrong-headedness of irrational Man, which seems to make him a natural patsy for con-men." By its end, the reader "will have dipped into the various forms which magic has taken and is taking, and will have been introduced to some of the eminent dupes who believed in it and the successful charlatans and fanatics who hoodwinked them." In fact, his "main quarrel with the book" is that "it is presented almost wholly as a ballet of dupes and charlatans;" he considers the authors "a little too unyielding in their criteria for distinguishing between scientists and charlatans," adding "I have the feeling that the de Camps, rationalists themselves, simply could not generate the same kind of understanding interest in this behavior that they showed in their examination of ancient ruins (archeological and archaeologists), or that Sprague brought to his classic study of lost continents." He views "[b]y far the best" the last chapter, "'The Great Glass Jewel,' which sums up the authors' conclusions about the interrelationships of magic, religion and science." He praises the bibliography as the kind he "like[s] to see ... limited to the references the author has used and to which he makes useful references."

Judith Merril, writing in The Magazine of Fantasy and Science Fiction, calls the book "the usual meticulous de Camp work--or doubly so, since this one is co-authored by L. Sprague and Catherine C." She assesses it as "a fascinating study of magic, in history and practice."

Lin Carter, rating it as the best non-fiction book of 1965 in the category of horror-fantasy books, called it "absolutely brilliant ... an utterly magnificent study of all phases of occultism, Theosophy, the Rosicrucians, spiritualism, alchemy, etc.--flawlessly researched, superbly erudite, beautifully written, and as devast[at]ingly keen-edged a hatchet-job as any since Voltaire invented the fine art of debunking." In a more in-depth review, he explains he finds the book "so enjoyable" because it explains "what real magic is really like," noting that "the authors explore every phase of black magic and occult lore to give ... a fascinating glimpse of ... just what these occult sciences really are, how they were supposed to work, and it makes for absorbing, entertaining reading." He calls the authors "witty, urbane, erudite, scrupulously detached." He also calls it "one of the most readable, witty, anecdotal and entertaining books ever on occultism and the Black Arts."

Fritz Leiber, singling out the history of magic as "the chiefest topic" of the book, welcomed it as "a book by competent scholars restating and extending the scientific arguments against the efficacy of magic, prophecy, necromancy, and other sorts of jiggery-pokery," for which he thought it "high time." He wrote "[w]e need more of this outlook in a culture uncritically obedient to advertising and propaganda, and falling dangerously in love with the irrational." Together with a selection of similar works on other subjects he felt it constituted "a readable sound backbone for a skeptic's library." Elements Leiber cited with approval included the de Camps' examination of "the primitive foundations of sorcery," the "historical development and ... modern instances of astrology, consultation of oracles, prophecy, witchcraft, alchemy, numerology, belief in fairyland, mesmerism (dubious parent of hypnotism, spiritualism, and theosophy." He commended them for their "sturdy moral stand" against occult charlatans and the mindsets of their "natural prey"—in the words of the authors, "people who want knowledge without study, health without self-discipline, wealth without work, safety without precautions, and, in general, happiness without earning it."
