= 1930 in science fiction =

The year 1930 was marked, in science fiction, by the following events.

== Births and deaths ==
=== Births ===
- June 3 : Marion Zimmer Bradley, American writer (died 1999)
- November 15 : J. G. Ballard, British writer (died 2009)
- Donald Malcolm, Scottish writer (died 2013)

== Events ==
- Creation of the American magazine Astounding Stories of Super-Science, now called Analog Science Fiction and Fact.

== Literary releases ==
=== Novels ===
- Last and First Men, by Olaf Stapledon.
- Tarzan at the Earth's Core, by Edgar Rice Burroughs.
- (in French) Utopolis, by (in German) Werner Illing.

== Movies ==
- Just Imagine directed by David Butler

== Awards ==
The main science fiction awards known at the present time did not exist at this time.

== See also ==
- 1930 in science
