= The Resurrection of Jimber-Jaw =

Short story by Edgar Rice Burroughs

"The Resurrection of Jimber-Jaw" is a 1937 short story by American writer Edgar Rice Burroughs, about an unfrozen 50,000-year-old caveman.

The story was originally printed in Argosy, and later reprinted as one of three stories in the collection, Tales of Three Planets (Canaveral, 1964, 1974). The Argosy text, used for all versions published under this title, contained significant alterations by the magazine editor of Burroughs' original text. Burroughs' original version, "Elmer", was published in Forgotten Tales of Love and Murder (Guidry & Adkins, 2001).

== Plot summary ==
The story turns about an experimental aviator and a cryogenicist, who are flying over Siberia when forced to land, after an airplane mechanical failure. They survive the landing, and happen to find the body of a caveman, frozen into a newly uncovered glacier wall. Jokingly, the aviator suggests that the cryogenicist attempt to revive the man, which he proceeds to do, using transfusions and injections of drugs. The caveman proves to be intelligent, and immensely strong. His name is Kolani and he soon learns enough English to communicate. Returned to America, he is given the stage name of Jim Stone, after he proves to be a professional wrestling sensation, who throws all contenders over the ropes and into the crowd.

Stone/Kolani eventually falls in love with a popular movie actress, who as it happens is a look-alike for his intended mate of long ago. In negotiating the ways of the new society of the 20th century, however, Kolani gives the opinion that modern women now act in nearly all ways like men, and he does not approve of any of it. After finding the actress, whom he has been romancing, with another man, he deliberately refreezes himself in a meat locker, with a note that he is seeking his real mate, and not to thaw him out again.

== See also ==
- "The Ugly Little Boy", a 1958 short story by Isaac Asimov about a cave boy scooped up by a time machine
- Iceman, a 1984 film about a thawed-out caveman
- Encino Man, a 1992 film about a thawed-out caveman
- The Man from Earth, a 2007 film about a professor claiming to be a caveman who has lived for more than 14,000 years
- "Unfrozen Caveman Lawyer", a Saturday Night Live sketch
