= Back to the Stone Age =

1937 Book by Edgar Rice Burroughs

- Dust-jacket illustration of Back to the Stone Age
- Author: Edgar Rice Burroughs
- Illustrator: John Coleman Burroughs
- Cover artist: John Coleman Burroughs
- Language: English
- Series: Pellucidar series
- Genre: adventure
- Publisher: Edgar Rice Burroughs, Inc.
- Publication date: 1937
- Publication place: United States
- Media type: Print (hardback)
- Pages: 318
- Preceded by: Tarzan at the Earth's Core
- Followed by: Land of Terror

Back to the Stone Age is a novel by American writer Edgar Rice Burroughs, the fifth in his series set in the lost world of Pellucidar. It first appeared as a six-part serial in Argosy Weekly from January 9 to February 13, 1937, under the title Seven Worlds to Conquer. It was first published in book form in hardcover by Edgar Rice Burroughs, Inc. in September, 1937 under the present title, and has been reissued a number of times since by various publishers.

== Plot summary ==
The story reveals the fate of Wilhelm von Horst, the lost member of the previous book's outer world expedition to Pellucidar, which had been led by Jason Gridley and Tarzan to rescue Pellucidarian emperor David Innes from the Korsars. The action begins by recapping the incident in which Gridley, von Horst, and Tarzan's Waziri warriors, led by Muviro, are caught up in and separated by a horde of saber-toothed tigers’ cooperative hunt. Now on his own, von Horst quickly becomes lost, links up again with the Waziri by accident, and gets lost again when he foolishly goes out hunting on his own.

First paperback edition of Back to the Stone Age

In the most powerful sequence in the book, von Horst becomes prey himself when a Trodon, or a pterodactyl-like Dragon, carries him off to its nest in the crater of a dead volcano. The explorer is left poisoned and paralyzed together with other victims, all of them intended as a living larder to feed the creature's young as its eggs hatch. Von Horst passes the time by getting to know a fellow paralytic, the native warrior Dangar of Sari, a member-tribe of Innes' empire. From him, the outer worlder gradually learns the Pellucidarian language. Von Horst's clothing prevented him from receiving a full dose of venom, and he recovers from his paralysis in time to save Dangar from the next hatchling. Shooting the immature trodon, he makes a long strap from its hide, lassos the parent on its next return, and after allowing it to fly off just past the lip of the crater, shoots it in turn. After securing the free end of the strap to the still paralyzed Dangar, he uses it to climb out of the trap, pulling his companion up after him. In the forest at the foot of the mountain he constructs a treehouse to serve them as a secure base while Dangar recovers.

Subsequently, von Horst rescues another native, Skruf of Basti, from a jalok (hyaenodon); Skruf is on a quest to kill a tarag (saber-toothed tiger), the head of which he needs as bride-price to secure a mate. As he knows the country, von Horst and Dangar accompany him once the latter has recovered. In due course they encounter the desired beast, from which Skruf hides in fear while his companions make the kill. Despite his cowardice Skruf takes the trophy, and the three continue on to the cliff-village of Basti. But once there he turns traitor, not only claiming the deed as his own but betraying his companions into slavery.

Von Horst and Dangar are put to work with other slaves of Basti digging new caves into the cliff. Von Horst becomes enamored of La-ja of Lo-har, a fellow captive, and in defending her touches off a general slave revolt. He leads all the slaves to freedom, whereupon they separate to return to their native tribes. Von Horst elects to accompany La-ja to Lo-har rather than continue to Sari with Dangar. The plot of the novel continues to unfold in its pattern of liberty, capture and escape, with the protagonist's goal imperceptibly altering from rejoining his outer world comrades to romance with La-ja. The feelings of the principals, while plain to the reader, are masked from their objects of affection by culturally-based misunderstanding, as is typical of Burroughs’ novels, postponing the ultimate resolution nearly to the end of the story.

The initial path of von Horst and La-ja takes them through the ill-reputed Forest of Death they encounter a juvenile zarith (Tyrannosaurus) until von Horst killed it. Within the forest are the labyrinthine caves of the Gorbuses, cannibalistic albinos who, in an eerie touch, are intimated to be murderers from the outer world, reincarnated in Pellucidar and consigned to this place as punishment. This is Burroughs’ sole nod toward the notion that his interior world might relate in any way to the concept of a subterranean hell. Falling prey to the Gorbuses, von Horst and La-ja are soon joined as captives by the Bastians Skruf and Frug, who have been trailing them. The four set aside their differences to effect their escape, but afterwards the Bastians betray the others’ trust, kidnapping La-ja.

Von Horst pursues the kidnappers, incidentally coming to the aid of a tandor (Woolly Mammoth) wounded by sharp stakes of bamboo, which, Androcles-like, he removes. He overtakes his quarry, but before matters can be settled, he and Frug are taken by the Mammoth Men, a native tribe utilizing mammoths as mounts; Skruf and La-ja elude the interlopers. Boarded on the family of a tribal warrior, von Horst once again commences plotting to escape, aided by dissatisfied locals, whose support he enlists, and the friendship of Thorek, a member of the tribe who had shared his earlier captivity in Basti. His opportunity comes when he and other prisoners are pitted against each other, sabertooths, and mammoths in a gladiatorial-like contest. One of the mammoths proves to be Old White, the beast he had aided previously; joining forces, they survive the melee and make a successful break for freedom.

Once again von Horst happens on Skruf and La-ja, intervening as they are attacked by the Ganaks, or bison-men. While able to kill a few of these he ultimately falls captive to them, this time in the company of La-ja. Their escape is aided by Old White, after which they are separated again, but von Horst falls in with another from La-ja's country, Gaj, a fellow former-prisoner of the Mammoth Men. Gaj's guidance enables him to follow La-ja to Lo-har. There he saves her from Gaz, an unwanted suitor, and he and La-ja finally acknowledge their love for each other. Their union results in him becoming chief of Lo-har, his new bride being the daughter of the Lo-harians’ former ruler Brun, who is absent searching for her.

The remaining plot threads are tied up by the arrival of a party from Sari led by David Innes, accompanied by Brun. Innes, it turns out, has taken up the pledge of Jason Gridley at the end of the previous book to rescue the missing von Horst—Gridley himself, anti-climatically, is revealed to have let himself be persuaded by other members of the expedition from the outer world to leave Pellucidar with them instead. Von Horst declines Innes’ offer take him back to Sari and what passes for civilization in the inner world, electing to remain in Lo-har with La-ja.

== Copyright ==
The copyright for this story has expired in Australia, and thus now resides in the public domain there. The text is available via Project Gutenberg Australia.

Preceded by Tarzan at the Earth's Core	Pellucidar series Back to the Stone Age	Succeeded by Land of Terror
