= John Coleman Burroughs =

American illustrator

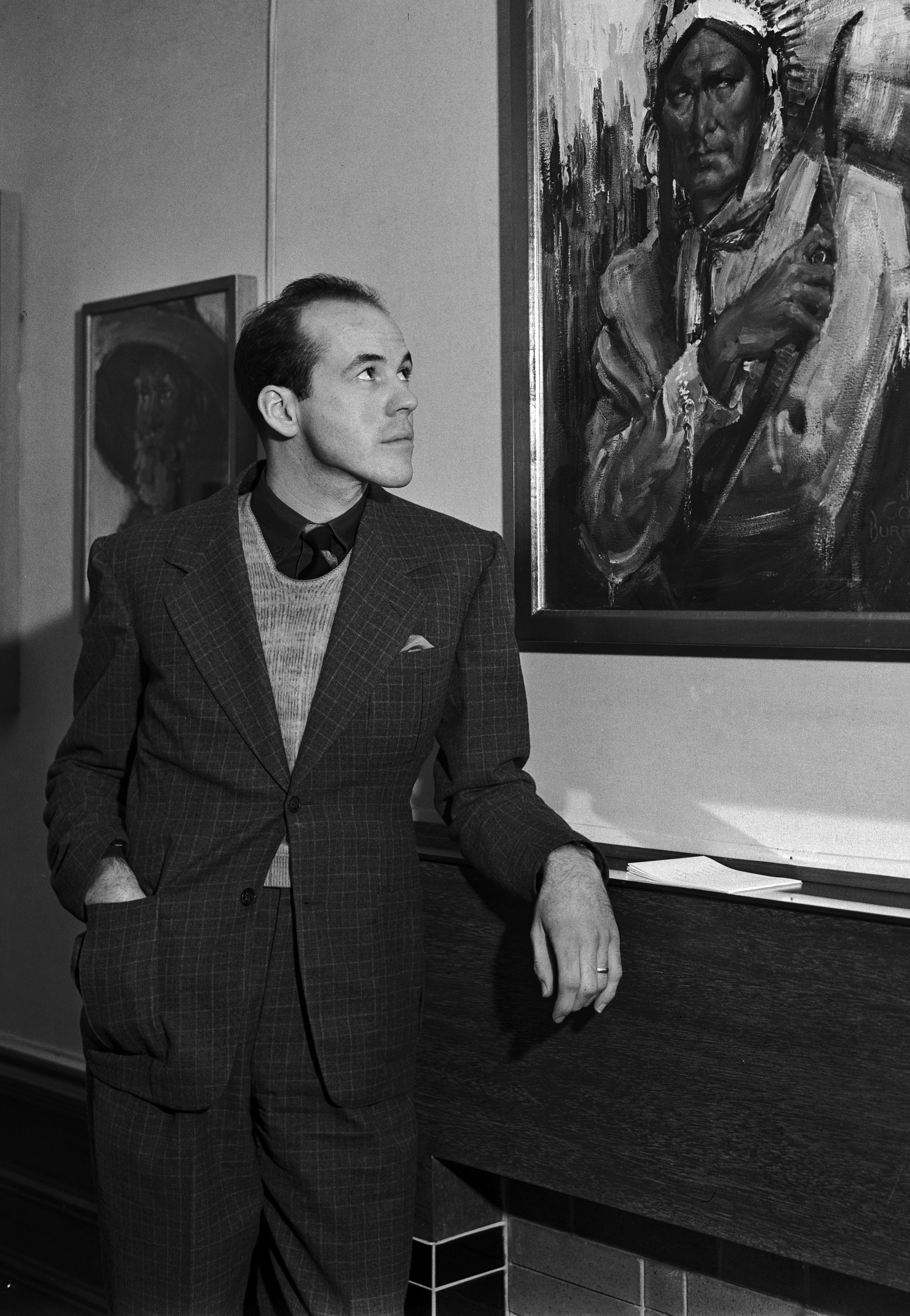
- Burroughs with one of his paintings, 1937
- Born: February 28, 1913
- Died: February 22, 1979 (aged 65)
- Known for: Illustrations of Edgar Rice Burroughs books.
- Spouse(s): Jane Ralston (m. Dec. 12, 1936; div. 1961); Mary Burroughs (m. Dec. 16, 1961, div. 1972)
- Children: 5

John Coleman Burroughs (February 28, 1913 – February 22, 1979) was an American illustrator known for his illustrations of the works of his father, Edgar Rice Burroughs.

== Life ==
Burroughs was born in Chicago, the son of Edgar Rice Burroughs, creator of Tarzan, and of his first wife, Emma Centennia Hulbert. When he was six, the family moved to California and settled on the estate they renamed Tarzana. John briefly attended Page Military Academy but couldn't adjust to the strict regimen and was removed in midyear and tutored at home (he had contracted a mild case of polio, and his parents were worried about his being exposed to the disease in public schools). He later attended the Los Angeles Coaching School, Urban Military Academy, and Van Nuys High School, where he wrote and illustrated stories, graduating in 1930. He then enrolled in Pomona College, graduating with honors in 1934.

On December 12, 1936, he married Jane Ralston. They had three children, John Ralston Burroughs, Danton Burroughs, and Dian Burroughs. They were divorced in 1961.

On December 16, 1961, John married his second wife, Mary, and they had two children together named Kim and Stacy. Mary and John divorced around 1972.

John's creative powers were sapped by Parkinson's disease in his final years.

== Career ==
John and his siblings Joan and Hulbert were all fans of their father's writing, but only John Coleman Burroughs added significantly to Edgar Rice Burroughs's works with new creative material.

=== In art ===
Growing up in an atmosphere saturated by his father's famous creations, John's first excursions into the professional art world were influenced by Edgar Rice Burroughs themes. At age 23, he was given the chance to illustrate his father's book, The Oakdale Affair and the Rider published on February 15, 1937. A few months earlier, His father had written: "It has always been the ambition of my son, Jack, and myself that one day he would illustrate one of my books. He is doing very excellent work, and I am having him illustrate the Spring book for us." John went on to illustrate all future Edgar Rice Burroughs books published during the author's lifetime – a total of over 125 illustrations. He also illustrated the John Carter Sunday newspaper strip, a David Innes of Pellucidar comic book feature and numerous Big Little Book covers. Burroughs was a photographer in the 1920s.

=== In writing ===
In addition to his artwork, John wrote a string of short stories with his brother Hulbert and his wife Jane Ralston, who also served as model for the heroines he drew. John's novel Treasure of the Black Falcon was published in 1967 by Ballantine Books. His later novel Danton Doring, written with Dr. John Eric Holmes, remained unfinished.

=== Legacy ===
In June 2003, Danton Burroughs opened a storage locker that had been sealed since his father's death in 1979. The room was packed with items that John Coleman Burroughs had amassed throughout his very productive life: personal effects, letters, documents, books, photos, sketches, clothing, paintings, charcoals, artwork done for major Hollywood film studios, World War II propaganda art and handbook illustrations for Douglas Aircraft Company, etc.

There were also a great many items passed on from John's father, Edgar Rice Burroughs, including the latter's military hat, favorite chair, film projector, a mold for creating a bust of Edgar Rice Burroughs, photo albums, business documents, journals, favorite books, etc. Photos of many of these items were taken as they were retrieved from the storage room. Danton has released material deemed of interest to Edgar Rice Burroughs fans on the JohnColemanBurroughs.com Website.

On May 1, 2008, Danton Burroughs died of a heart attack following a fire in the family home in Tarzana, which destroyed a room containing memorabilia of his father John Coleman Burroughs and grandfather Edgar Rice Burroughs. The cause of the fire is unknown.
