= Savage Pellucidar =

1963 Book by Edgar Rice Burroughs

- dust-jacket illustration for first edition of Savage Pellucidar
- Author: Edgar Rice Burroughs
- Cover artist: J. Allen St. John
- Language: English
- Series: Pellucidar
- Genre: Fantasy
- Publisher: Canaveral Press
- Publication date: 1963
- Publication place: United States
- Media type: Print (hardback)
- Pages: 274
- Preceded by: Land of Terror
- Followed by: Mahars of Pellucidar

Savage Pellucidar is a 1963 fantasy story collection by American writer Edgar Rice Burroughs, the seventh and final book in his series about the fictional "Hollow Earth" land of Pellucidar. It was published twelve years after Burroughs's death.

Like a number of other posthumously published books by Burroughs, this book is not a novel but a collection of short stories. The first three stories, The Return to Pellucidar, Men of the Bronze Age and Tiger Girl, were published in the magazine Amazing Stories in February, March, and April 1942. The fourth story, Savage Pellucidar, was published for the first time in November 1963 after being discovered in a safe by Burroughs' son Hulbert in the early 1960s.

== Stories ==
- "The Return to Pellucidar"
- "Men of the Bronze Age"
- "Tiger Girl"
- "Savage Pellucidar"

== Plot ==
- In "The Return to Pellucidar", David Innes goes for a war and becomes a POW again, while Abner Perry makes a balloon which escapes with Dian the Beautiful in it.
- In "Men of the Bronze Age", Dian meets the people who have advanced to a Bronze Age cultural level and is taken to be a goddess.
- In "Tiger Girl", David Innes goes after Dian in another balloon and plays the role of a god.
- In "Savage Pellucidar", two separate search parties look for the lost ones with neither knowing that the other has already found the one they are seeking.

== Copyright ==
The copyright for this story was renewed in the United States on 9 December 1991 by Edgar Rice Burroughs, Inc. (renewal reference number: RE0000570901). The copyright should therefore expire in the United States on 1 January 2059. The copyright for this story has expired in Australia, and thus now resides in the public domain there. The text is available via Project Gutenberg Australia.

| Preceded by Land of Terror | Pellucidar series Savage Pellucidar | Succeeded by Mahars of Pellucidar |
