= Cities & Scenes from the Ancient World =

Cities & Scenes from the Ancient World is a 1974 book written by Roy G. Krenkel.

== Contents ==
Cities & Scenes from the Ancient World is a book in which the illustrations of the foundational fantasy artist Krenkel are presented, and discusses how his fine-line technique and imaginative vision shaped the field—and even the early work of Frank Frazetta. Krenkel uses black and white to evoke scenes from ancient worlds not through reference materials but through imaginative recall. Krenkel rarely planned his compositions, instead sketching spontaneously. The book is densely packed with nearly 200 illustrations, ranging from full-page vistas to intricate "doodles" of warriors, animals, and city life. These smaller sketches are rendered with a subtle grayscale palette.

== Reception ==
C. J. Henderson reviewed Cities & Scenes from the Ancient World for Pegasus magazine and stated that "Cities & Scenes From the Ancient World is one of the finest art books available to the public today. If you have a liking for such things (and can spare the cash in this depressed economy), you should treat yourself. You will find the enjoyment received will far out-balance the price."

== Reviews ==
- Review by J. B. Post (1974) in Luna Monthly, #54, September 1974
- Review by Stuart David Schiff (1974) in Whispers, November 1974
