= At the Earth's Core (novel) =

1914 book by Edgar Rice Burroughs

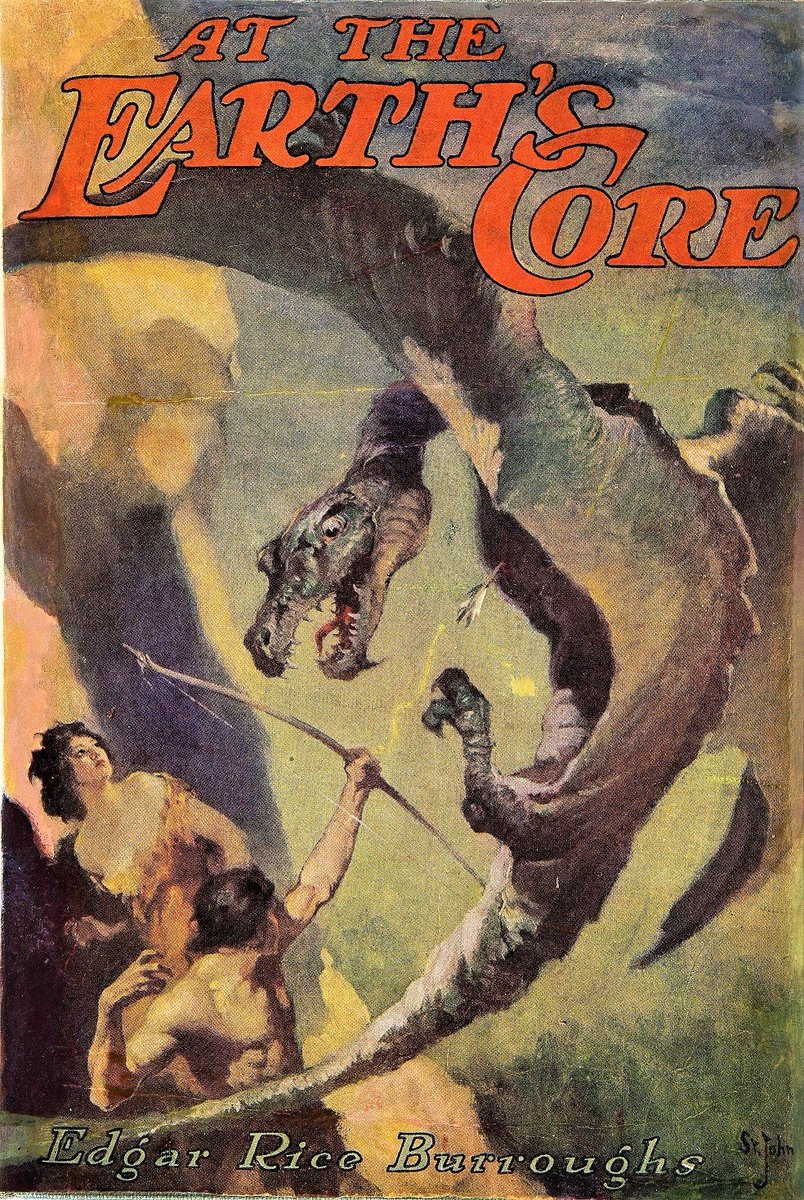
- Dust-jacket illustration for At the Earth's Core
- Author: Edgar Rice Burroughs
- Cover artist: J. Allen St. John
- Language: English
- Series: Pellucidar
- Genre: Fantasy
- Publisher: A. C. McClurg
- Publication date: 1914 (serialized); 1922 (hardcover)
- Publication place: United States
- Media type: Print (hardcover)
- Pages: 277
- Followed by: Pellucidar
- Text: At the Earth's Core at Wikisource

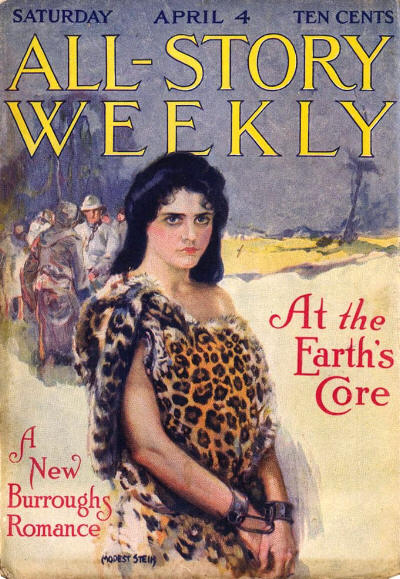
At The Earth's Core was serialized in All Story Weekly in 1914.

At the Earth's Core is a 1914 fantasy novel by American writer Edgar Rice Burroughs, the first in his series about the fictional "Hollow Earth" land of Pellucidar. It first appeared as a four-part serial in All-Story Weekly from April 4 to 25, 1914. It was first published in book form in hardcover by A. C. McClurg in July, 1922.

== Plot summary ==
The author relates how, traveling in the Sahara desert, he has encountered a remarkable vehicle and its pilot, David Innes, a man with a remarkable story to tell.

David Innes is a mining heir who finances the experimental "iron mole," an excavating vehicle designed by his elderly inventor friend Abner Perry. In a test run, they discover the vehicle cannot be turned, and it burrows 500 miles into the Earth's crust, emerging into the unknown interior world of Pellucidar. In Burroughs' concept, the Earth is a hollow shell with Pellucidar as the internal surface of that shell.

Pellucidar is inhabited by prehistoric creatures of all geological eras, and dominated by the Mahars, a species of large, Rhamphorhynchus-like pterosaur both intelligent and civilized, but which enslaves and preys on the local Stone Age humans. Innes and Perry are captured by the Mahars' gorilla-like Sagoth servants and taken with other human captives to the chief Mahar city of Phutra. Among their fellow captives are the brave Ghak, the Hairy One, from the country of Sari, the shifty Hooja the Sly One and the lovely Dian the Beautiful of Amoz.

David Innes, attracted to Dian the Beautiful, defends her against the unwanted attentions of Hooja the Sly One, but due to his ignorance of local customs she assumes he wants her as a slave, not a friend or lover, and subsequently snubs him. Only later, after Hooja slips their captors in a dark tunnel and forces Dian to leave with him, does David learn from Ghak the cause of the misunderstanding.

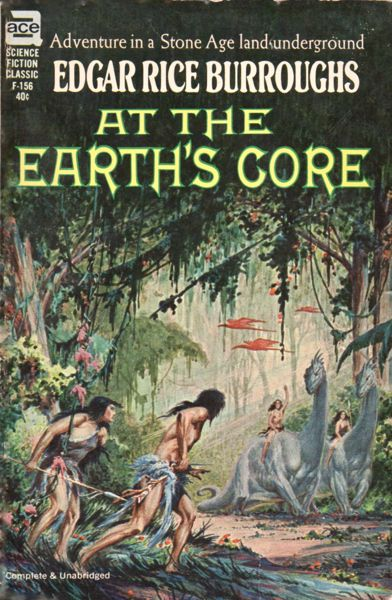
First paperback edition of At the Earth's Core, 1962. Cover by Roy Krenkel.

In Phutra the captives become slaves, and the two surface worlders learn more of Pellucidar and Mahar society. The Mahars are all female, reproducing parthenogenetically by means of a closely guarded "Great Secret" contained in a Mahar book. David learns that they also feast on selected human captives in a secret ritual. In a disturbance, David manages to escape Phutra, becomes lost, and experiences a number of adventures before sneaking back into the city. Rejoining Abner, he finds the latter did not even realize he was gone, and the two discover that time in Pellucidar, in the absence of objective means to measure it, is a subjective thing, experienced by different people at different rates.

Obsessed with righting the wrong he has unwittingly done Dian, David Innes escapes again and eventually finds and wins her by defeating the malevolent Jubal the Ugly One, another unwanted suitor. David makes amends, and he and Dian wed.

Later, along with Ghak and other allies, David Innes and Abner Perry lead a revolt of humankind against the cruel Mahars. Their foes are hampered by the loss of the Great Secret, which David has stolen and hidden. To further the struggle David returns to the Iron Mole, in which he and Dian propose to travel back to the surface world to procure outer world technology. Only after it is underway does he discover that Hooja the Sly One has substituted a drugged Mahar for Dian the Beautiful.

Back in the world we know David meets the author, who after hearing his tale and seeing his prehistoric captive, helps him resupply and prepare the mole for the return to Pellucidar.

== Critical reception ==
Galaxy reviewer Floyd C. Gale, discussing the 1962 paperback edition, praised the novel; he said that "Burroughs's concepts are intriguing and his combat scenes gripping." Gale faulted the novel's style, noting that "the reader must wade at least twenty-five pages into the book before he can cease to be annoyed by the author's stilted and florid style", but promised that "by then he has reached the point of no return".

== Adaptations ==
The novel was filmed as At the Earth's Core (1976), directed by Kevin Connor and starring Doug McClure as David Innes and Peter Cushing as Abner Perry.

When DC Comics gained the license to adapt the works of Edgar Rice Burroughs, they managed to adapt the first Pellucidar book, with Len Wein scripting, and various artists such as Mike Kaluta and Murphy Anderson on art. The adaptation started out Korak, Son of Tarzan #46, then moved to Weird Worlds, where it ran from #1-6.

The 2008 movie Journey to Middle Earth also shares several similarities with the events and locations of the novel, although the film was intended as a loose adaptation of Journey to the Center of the Earth by Jules Verne.

== Legacy ==
Other authors have been inspired by Burroughs' depiction of the strange subterranean world, most notably H.P. Lovecraft whose At the Mountains of Madness was heavily influenced by At the Earth's Core, particularly in the name of the Elder Things' slave race, the Shoggoths. Another and more direct homage to Burroughs' concept is Lin Carter's "Zanthodon" series, beginning with his novel Journey to the Underground World.

Prolific manga artist Shotaro Ishinomori also loosely adapted the book for the final story arc of the original Cyborg 009 manga.

== Sources ==
- Bleiler, Everett (1948). The Checklist of Fantastic Literature. Chicago: Shasta Publishers. p. 66.

Preceded by none	Pellucidar series At the Earth's Core	Succeeded by Pellucidar
