= Pellucidar (novel) =

1923 Book by Edgar Rice Burroughs

- Dust-jacket illustration from first edition of Pellucidar
- Author: Edgar Rice Burroughs
- Illustrator: J. Allen St. John
- Cover artist: J. Allen St. John
- Language: English
- Series: Pellucidar
- Genre: Fantasy
- Publisher: A. C. McClurg
- Publication date: 1915 (serialized); 1923 (hardcover)
- Publication place: United States
- Media type: Print (Hardback)
- Preceded by: At the Earth's Core
- Followed by: Tanar of Pellucidar

Pellucidar is a 1915 fantasy novel by American writer Edgar Rice Burroughs, the second in his series about the fictional "Hollow Earth" land of Pellucidar. It first appeared as a five-part serial in All-Story Weekly from May 1 to 29, 1915. It was first published in book form in hardcover by A. C. McClurg in September, 1923. A map by Burroughs of the Empire of Pellucidar accompanied both the magazine and book versions.

== Plot summary ==
David Innes and his captive, a member of the reptilian Mahar master race of the interior world of Pellucidar, return from the surface world in the Iron Mole invented by his friend and companion in adventure Abner Perry.

Emerging in Pellucidar at an unknown location, David frees his captive. He names the place Greenwich and uses the technology he has brought to begin the systematic exploration and mapping of the unknown land while searching for his lost companions, Abner, Ghak, and Dian the Beautiful. He soon encounters and befriends a new ally, Ja the Mezop of the island country of Anoroc; later he finds Abner, from whom he learns that in his absence the human revolt against the Mahars has not been going well. Along the way, he befriends a mated pair of Hyaenodon that he names Raja and Ranee.

a later printing of Pellucidar

In a parlay with the Mahars, David bargains for information of his love Dian and his enemy Hooja the Sly One, which his foes agree to supply in return for the book containing the Great Secret of Mahar reproduction that David stole and hid in the previous novel. David undertakes to recover it, only to find that Hooja has been there before him and claimed Dian as his own reward of the Mahars!

Now he has to track down and defeat the sly one before resuming the human war of independence. Ultimately this is accomplished, and with the aid of the resources David has brought from the surface world he and Abner succeed in building a confederacy of human tribes into an "Empire of Pellucidar" that wipes out the Mahar cities and establishes a new human civilization in their place.

== Reception ==
Galaxy reviewer Floyd C. Gale, discussing the 1962 reprint, noted that the novel's "scientific" background was "hard swallowing" but praised the novel, saying "once Burroughs establishes his background, his reader has no time to quibble".

== Adaptation ==
DC Comics began an adaptation of the novel in Weird Worlds #6, mixing it with the ending of At the Earth's Core. It ended in #7.

== Copyright ==
The copyright for this story has expired in the United States, and thus now resides in the public domain there. The text is available via Project Gutenberg.

Preceded by At the Earth's Core	Pellucidar series Pellucidar	Succeeded by Tanar of Pellucidar
