= Pellucidar =

Fictional Hollow Earth invented by Edgar Rice Burroughs

Pellucidar series
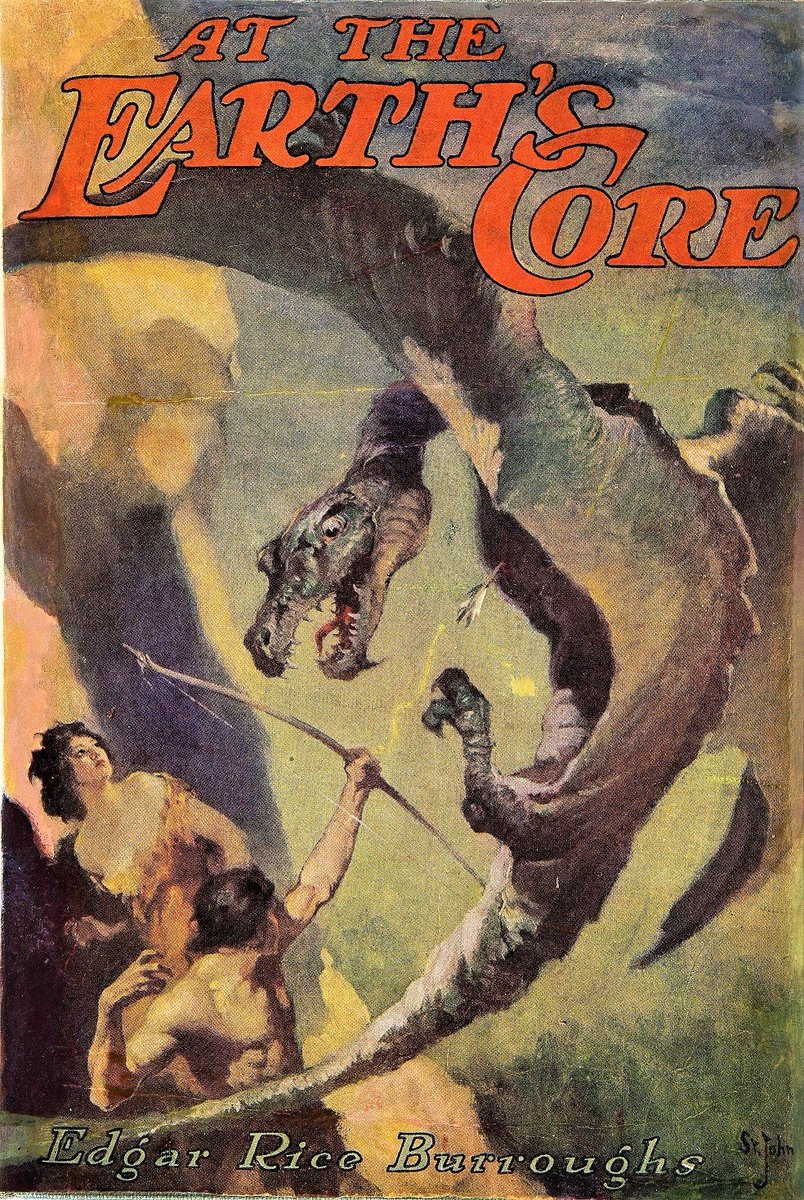
- At the Earth's Core (1914); Pellucidar (1915); Tanar of Pellucidar (1929); Tarzan at the Earth's Core (1929); Back to the Stone Age (1937); Land of Terror (1944); Savage Pellucidar (1963)
- Author: Edgar Rice Burroughs
- Country: United States
- Genre: Adventure novel
- Published: 1914–1963
- No. of books: 7

Pellucidar
- At the Earth's Core location
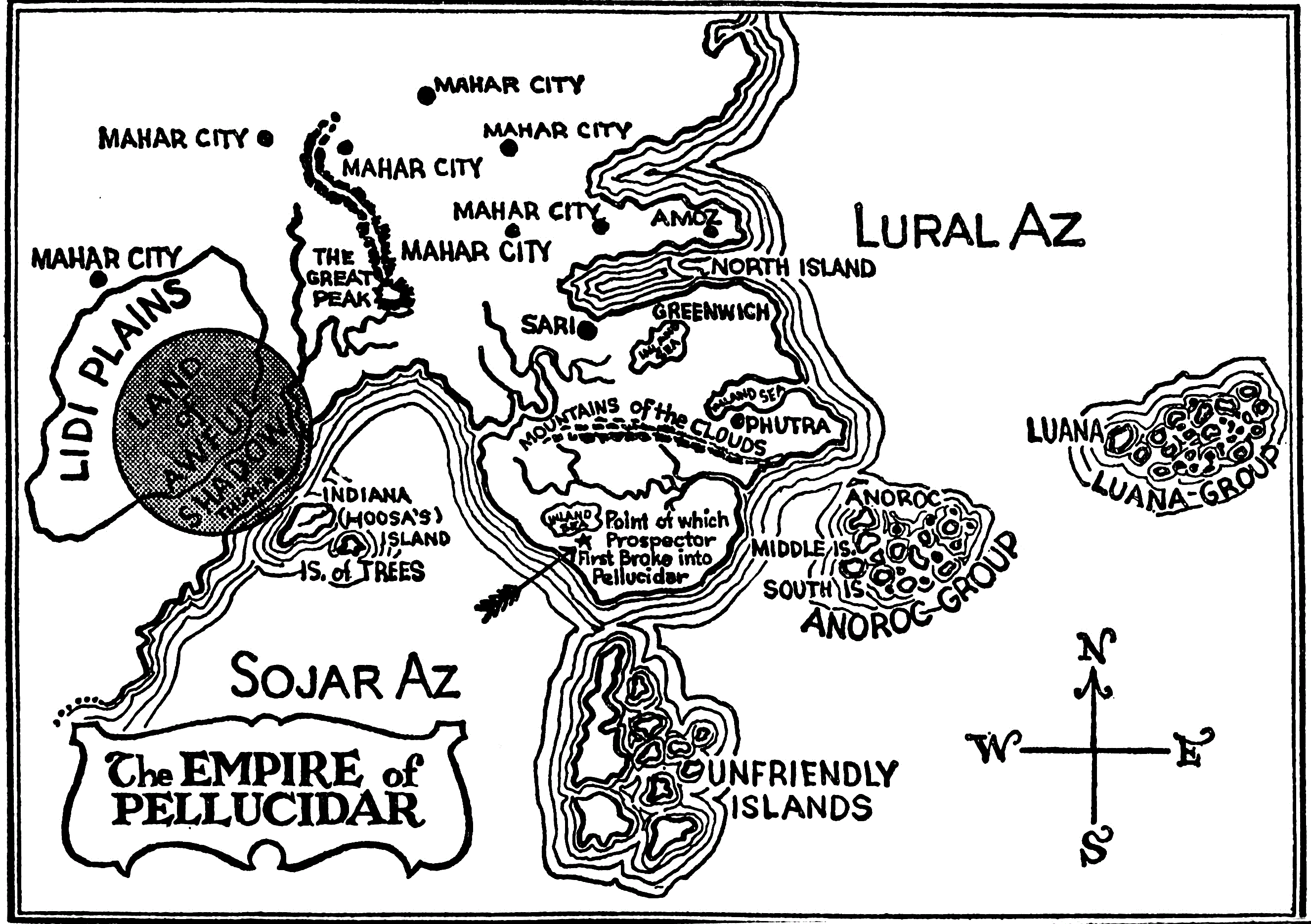
- The original map of Pellucidar from the first edition of Pellucidar (1915).
- Created by: Edgar Rice Burroughs

In-universe information
- Type: Hollow Earth
- Races: Ape-Men; Azarians; Brute-Men; Coripies; Ginaks; Gilacks; Gorbuses; Horbis; Jukans; Korsars; Mahars; Mammoth Men; Manats; Mezops; Sabretooth Men; Sagoths; Tandar; Xexots
- Characters: David Innes; Abner Perry; Dian the Beautiful; Tanar; Jason Gridley; Tarzan

Pellucidar is the fictional internal surface of a Hollow Earth invented by American writer Edgar Rice Burroughs for a series of action adventure stories. In a crossover event, Tarzan, who was also created by Burroughs, visits Pellucidar.

The stories initially involve the adventures of mining heir David Innes and his inventor friend Abner Perry after they use an "iron mole" to burrow 500 miles into the Earth's crust. Later protagonists include indigenous caveman Tanar and additional visitors from the surface world, notably Tarzan, Jason Gridley, and Frederich Wilhelm Eric von Mendeldorf und von Horst.

== Geography ==
In Burroughs' concept, the Earth is a hollow shell with Pellucidar as the internal surface of its shell. Pellucidar is accessible to the surface world via a polar tunnel, allowing passage between the inner and outer worlds through which a rigid airship visits in the fourth book of the series. Although the inner surface of the Earth has a smaller total area than the outer, Pellucidar actually has a greater land area, as its continents mirror the surface world's oceans and its oceans mirror the surface world's continents.

The peculiarities of Pellucidar's geography are caused by the concave curvature of its surface. There is no horizon; the further distant an object is, the higher it appears to be, until it is finally lost in a void of atmospheric haze.

Pellucidar is lit by a miniature sun suspended at the center of the hollow sphere, so it is perpetually overhead and gives a sensation of eternal noon wherever one is in Pellucidar. The sole exception is a region directly under a tiny geostationary moon of the internal sun. As a result, this region is under a perpetual eclipse and is known as the "Land of Awful Shadow". The moon has its own plant life and (presumably) animal life, and either has its own atmosphere or is simply suspended within Pellucidar's. The miniature sun does not change in brightness and never sets. As a result, with no night or seasonal progression, the natives have little concept of time. The events of the series suggest that time is elastic, passing at different rates in different areas of Pellucidar and varying even in single locations. Also, several characters living in Pellucidar who are originally from the outer world appear to age slowly and exhibit considerable longevity. This is known through their interactions with visitors from the outer world, where time passes at a fixed rate.

== Culture ==
Pellucidar is populated by primitive civilizations and prehistoric creatures, including dinosaurs. The region in which Innes and Perry initially find themselves is ruled by the Mahars, a species of intelligent pterosaurs resembling Rhamphorhynchus with vast psychic powers. The Mahars use telekinesis on the neighboring tribes of Stone Age humans as a way of securing their territory. Eventually, two explorers united the tribes in overthrowing the Mahars' reign and establish a human "Empire of Pellucidar" instead.

While the Mahars are the dominant species in the Pellucidar novels, these creatures are usually confined to their handful of cities. Before their downfall, the Mahars used Sagoths (a race of gorilla-men who speak the same language as Tarzan's Mangani) in enforcing their rule over any tribes who disobeyed their orders. Though Burroughs' novels suggest that the Mahars' domain is limited to one relatively small region of Pellucidar, John Eric Holmes' authorized sequel Mahars of Pellucidar indicates there are other areas ruled by Mahars.

Beyond the Mahars' domain exist independent human cultures, many of them at a Stone Age level of development. Technically, more advanced exceptions include the Korsars (corsairs), a maritime raiding society descended from surface-world Barbary pirates, and the Xexots, an indigenous Bronze Age civilization. All of the human inhabitants in Pellucidar share a common worldwide language.

== Wildlife ==
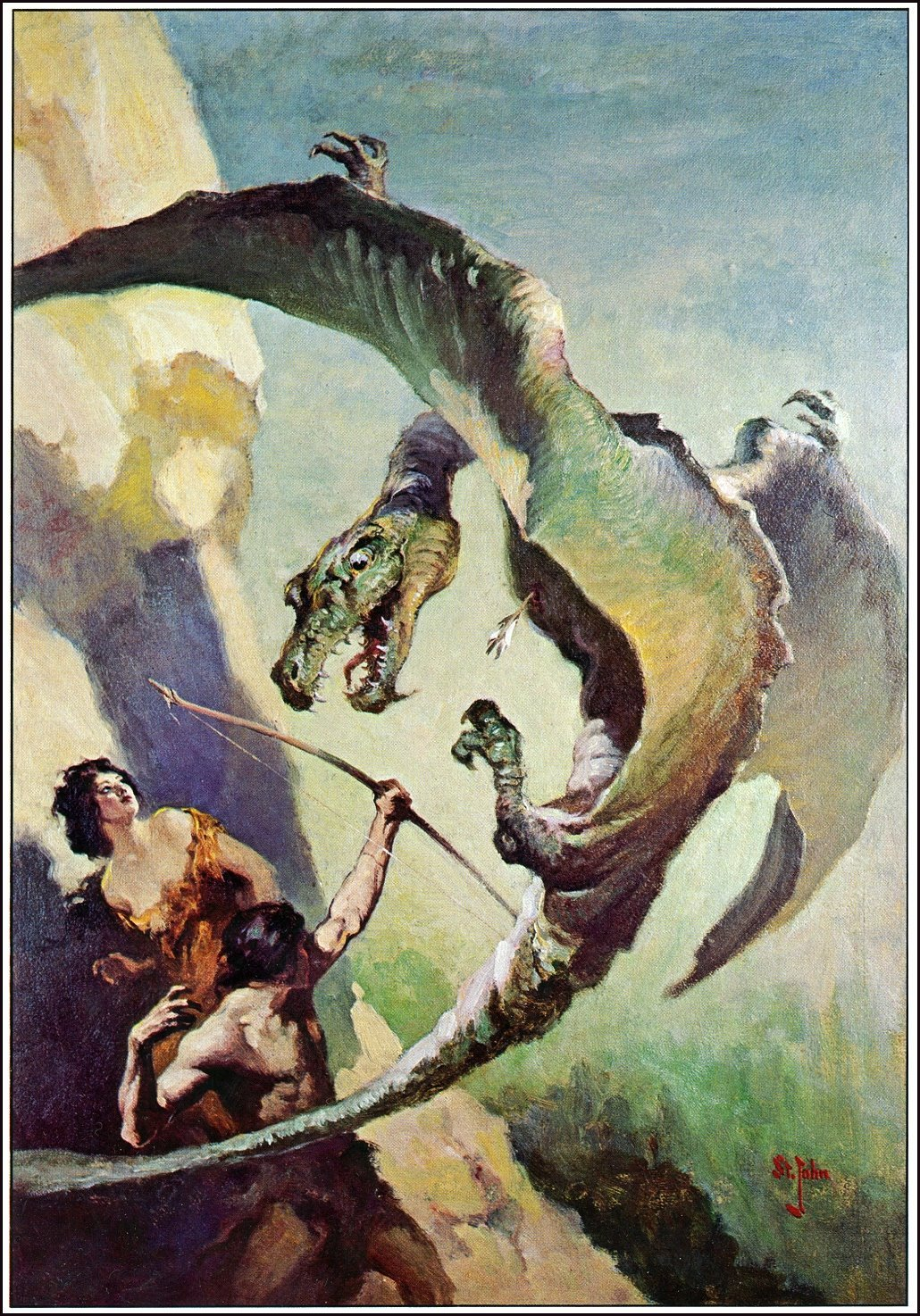
Painting of a "thipdar" for the cover of At the Earth's Core (1922), by J. Allen St. John

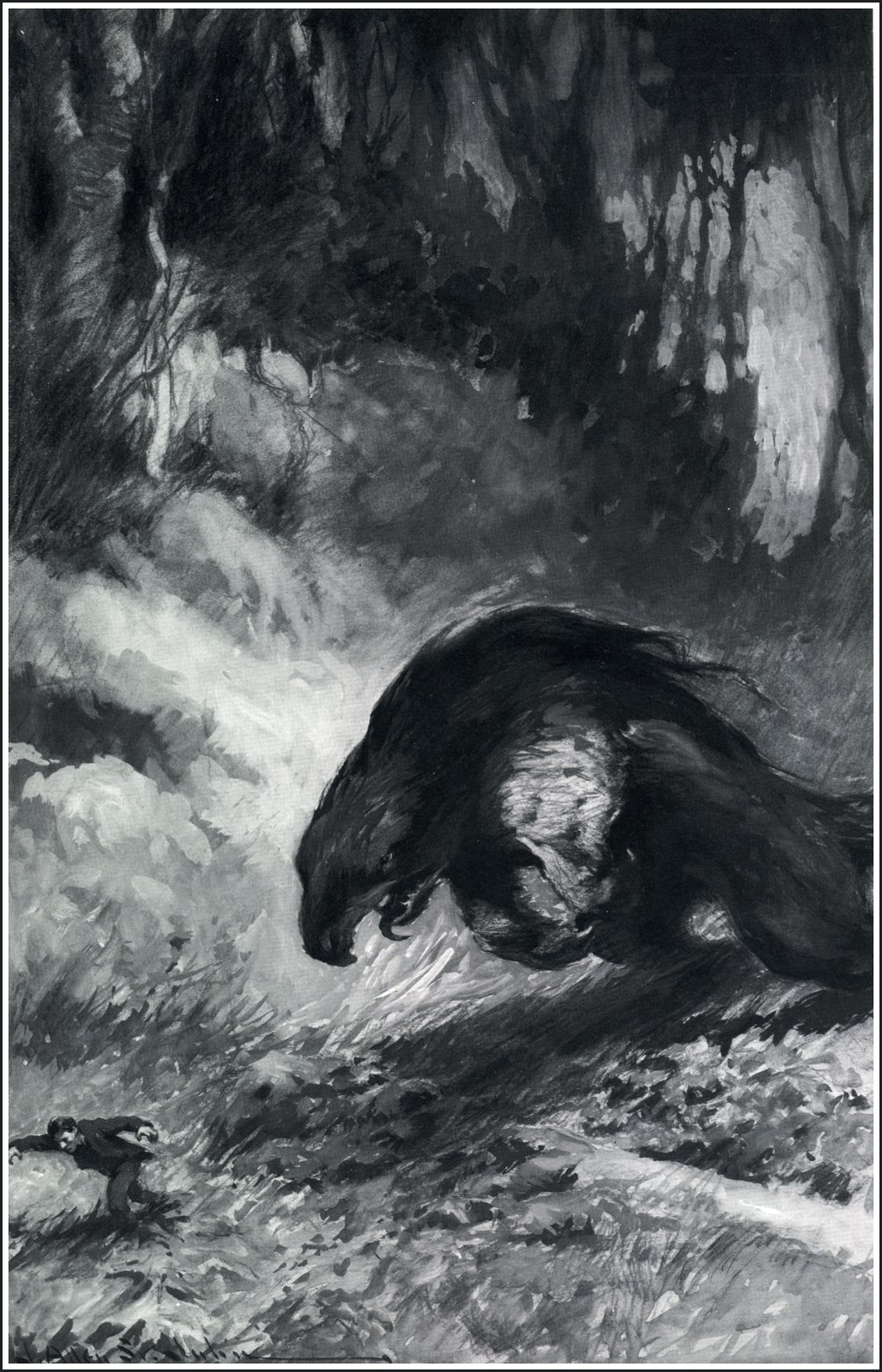
Illustration of a "dyryth" from At the Earth's Core (1922), by J. Allen St. John

Various animals reside in Pellucidar. Many of Pellucidar's fauna consist of prehistoric creatures, which are extinct on the surface world. However, some animals are creations of Edgar Rice Burroughs himself. They are listed below by outer world name (if known), Pellucidarian name (if known), and the novel in which they first appear, along with any relevant comments.

- Allosaurus — Pellucidarian name unknown.
- Ant Bear — An elephant-sized orycteropodid (which the Aardvark is a part of) which preys on the Giant Ants. It has no outer world equivalent and its Pellucidarian name is unknown.
- Antelopes — Pellucidarian name unknown. One antelope species resembles a common eland with spiral horns curved to the back of their ears. It first appeared in At the Earth's Core.
- Apatosaurus — Pellucidarian name unknown.
- Archaeopteryx — Pellucidarian name unknown. It first appeared in Tarzan at the Earth's Core.
- Archelon (Tola) — It first appeared in At the Earth's Core.
- Aurochs (Thag) — It first appeared in At the Earth's Core.
- Aztarag — A sea creature which is nicknamed the "Tiger of the Sea". The Pellucidarian name for an unidentified outer world equivalent.
- Brachiosaurus — Pellucidarian name inknown.
- Cave bear (Ryth) — It first appeared in At the Earth's Core.
- Cave hyena — Pellucidarian name unknown. It first appeared in Pellucidar.
- Cave lion (Ta-ho) — It first appeared in At the Earth's Core.
- Deinotherium — Pellucidarian name unknown. It first appeared in Tarzan at the Earth's Core.
- Dimetrodon — Pellucidarian name unknown.
- Dimorphodon — Pellucidarian name unknown.
- Diplodocus (Lidi) — It first appeared in At the Earth's Core.
- Dire wolf (Codon)
- Giant Ants — No outer world equivalent. Pellucidarian name unknown. They are six feet long and are preyed upon by the Ant Bears.
- Goats — They are domesticated by the Ape-Men. They first appeared in At the Earth's Core.
- Gomphotherium — Pellucidarian name unknown.
- Hyaenodon (Jalok) — A dog-like carnivore which is not related to either hyenas or wolves. They have been referred to as Wolfdogs and can be domesticated by the Ape-Men. In Pellucidar David domesticates two of them. It first appeared in At the Earth's Core.
- Hydrophidian — A giant sea snake that is designated by Burroughs. Neither the actual outer world or Pellucidarian equivalent are known. It first appeared in At the Earth's Core.
- Hyracotherium (Orthopi) — It first appeared in At the Earth's Core.
- Ichthyosaurus (Azdyryth) — It first appeared in At the Earth's Core.
- Iguanodon — Pellucidarian name unknown.
- Labyrinthodont (Sithic) — A giant carnivorous amphibian. It first appeared in At the Earth's Core.
- Mastodon (Maj) — It first appeared in Tanar of Pellucidar.
- Megacerops (identified by its synonym Brontotherium) — Pellucidarian name unknown.
- Megaloceros — Pellucidarian name unknown. It first appeared in Pellucidar.
- Megatherium (Dyryth) — It first appeared in At the Earth's Core.
- Pareiasaurus (Gorobor) — Giant lizard-like reptiles which serve as the Horibs' mode of transportation, as they are the fastest creatures in Pellucidar. They first appeared in Tarzan at the Earth's Core.
- Phorusrhacos (Dyal) — It first appeared in Tarzan at the Earth's Core.
- Plesiosaurus (Tandoraz, Ta-ho-az) — The two Pellucidarian names refer to large and small varieties. It first appeared in At the Earth's Core.
- Polacanthus — Pellucidarian name unknown.
- Protoceratops — Pellucidarian name unknown.
- Pteranodon (Thipdar) — It first appeared in At the Earth's Core. They are sometimes used as the pets and guard animals of the Mahars.
- Pterodactylus (Thipdar) — It first appeared in At the Earth's Core.
- Rhamphorhynchus (Mahar) — An oversized species of intelligent pterosaurs. It first appeared in At the Earth's Core.
- Sharks — The sharks of Pellucidar are larger than normal sharks. It was never mentioned if these sharks are either Megalodon, Carcharodon hubbeli, or any other related prehistoric sharks.
- Smilodon (Tarag) — It first appeared in At the Earth's Core.
- Snakes — Venomous vipers which the characters use to make poisoned arrows. They first appeared in At the Earth's Core.
- Stegosaurus (Dyrodor) — A carnivorous variety that able to manipulate its back plates to allow it to glide (unlike a real Stegosaurus).
- Styracosaurus — Pellucidarian name unknown.
- Tapir — Pellucidarian name unknown.
- Trachodon — Pellucidarian name unknown.
- Triceratops (Gyor) — An ill-tempered dinosaur. They are often hunted by Horibs.
- Trodon — Pellucidarian name for a creature with no outer world equivalent. The Trodon are dragon-like flying reptiles with pouches similar to those of kangaroos. Not to be confused with the Troodon, an actual dinosaur. It first appeared in Back to the Stone Age where it carried Von Horst to its nest in the crater of a dead volcano.
- Troodon — Pellucidarian name unknown.
- Tylosaurus — Pellucidarian name unknown.
- Tyrannosaurus (Zarith) — The Tyrannosaurus are one of the dominant predators in Pellucidar. Von Horst and La-Ja encountered a juvenile specimen the Forest of Death, and was about to devour a Gorbus, a member of a weird, cruel, albino race. Von Horst was able to kill the beast. La-Ja informs him that adult zarith feed on the giant Bos, the aurochs, and on the mighty mammoth.
- Velociraptor — Pellucidarian name unknown.
- Whales (referred to as "Herbivorous Cetaceans" by Perry) — The whales of Pellucidar weigh around four to five pounds, are vegetarian and brightly colored, and reside in bodies of fresh water instead of salt water, as whales do in the outer world. They first appeared in At the Earth's Core.
- Woolly mammoth (Tandor) — It first appeared in At the Earth's Core. Some woolly mammoths are used as mounts by a tribe of natives called the Mammoth Men.
- Woolly rhinoceros (Sadok) — It first appeared in At the Earth's Core.

== Races and tribes ==
Pellucidar is also inhabited by enclaves of various non-human or semi-human races one of whom are the stone age humans of the inner world. Among the known races and tribes in Pellucidar are:

- Ape-Men — A race of black-skinned creatures with prehensile tails, receding foreheads, long arms, and short legs who are arboreal in nature. They are known for domesticating goats and Hyaenodons.
- Azarians — A race of 7 ft. primitive man-eating giants with ugly faces and yellow tusk-like teeth.
- Beast-Men — Also called Brute-Men, see below.
- Bison Men — Also known as Ganaks, see below.
- Brute-Men — A peaceful 7 ft. race of ape-like farmers. They are also called Beast-Men, and sometimes called "Gorilla-Sheep" for the sheep-like appearance of their faces which go with the bull-like neck and fangs of a gorilla.
- Coripies — A subterranean race of 5 ft. eyeless carrion-eaters. They are also known as the Buried People.
- Ganaks — A race of squat stocky humanoids with long brown hair, long horns, and tails with brushy tufts at the end; they are also called the Bison Men. Despite being herbivorous, the Ganaks sometimes capture humans and sacrifice them in a morbid ritual.
- Gilaks — A tribe of Pellucidarian humans with enhanced homing instincts that is on the level of the Stone Age. They are sometimes slaves to the Mahars and their servants the Sagoths.
- Gorbuses — A subterranean race of cannibalistic albinos with long white tusks, who are apparently resurrected surface-world serial killers that are confined here as their punishment.
- Horibs — A race of ferocious Cotylosaurs-riding reptile men with snake-like heads, lizard-like bodies, pointed ears, and two sharp horns. The Horibs are known to hunt humans and Gyor (Triceratops).
- Jukans — An eccentric race of creatures who have short-cropped hairs and flabby mouths.
- Korsars — A tribe of humans who are the descendants of Barbary pirates. Their ancestors discovered Pellucidar and have been unable to travel back to the surface. They live in the kingdom of Korsar, which is across the Sea of Korsar.
- Mahars — The master race in Pellucidar who resemble humanoid Rhamphorhynchus. They enslave the Stone Age Humans of Pellucidar with the help of their servants, the Sagoths. They are also deaf, but have developed a form of “musical” entertainment based on motion. Their guard animals are Pteranodons.
- Mammoth Men — A tribe of cave-dwelling natives who use woolly mammoths as their mounts. They reside in the Ja-Ru region of Pellucidar.
- Manats — A tribe who live on one side of the Island of Tandar and often fight with the Tandar.
- Mezops — A race of seafaring islanders, fishermen, and hunters who are similar to the Native Americans.
- Sabertooth Men — A race of cannibalistic black-skinned man-eating creatures with prehensile tails and dagger-like tusks. The Sabertooth Men live in a volcanic crater near Kali and have a monkey-like language.
- Sagoths — The brown-furred gorilla-like servants of the Mahars who are lighter in build than a gorilla. Their language is similar to the Mangani.
- Tandar — A tribe who live on the Island of Tandar and often fight with the Manats.
- Xexots — A tribe of yellow-skinned humans whose culture is based on the Bronze Age. The Xexots reside in walled cities. The male and female Xexots wear nothing on their torsos. The children and other younger Xexots never wear clothes. Also, the priests are distinguished by their hideous masks and long leather robes.

== Novels ==
1. At the Earth's Core (1914)
2. Pellucidar (1915)
3. Tanar of Pellucidar (1929)
4. Tarzan at the Earth's Core (1929-1930)
5. Back to the Stone Age (1937)
6. Land of Terror (1944)
7. Savage Pellucidar (1963)

== Sequels by John Eric Holmes ==
John Eric Holmes's Mahars of Pellucidar was a sequel to Burroughs' Pellucidar novels authorized by the Burroughs estate. Publication of Holmes' follow-up novel, Red Axe of Pellucidar, reportedly ready for print in 1980, was reportedly blocked by the estate, and only saw print much later in a limited private edition.

1. Mahars of Pellucidar (1976)
2. Red Axe of Pellucidar (1993)

== In other media ==
DC Comics published a comic book adaptation of At the Earth's Core that ran in Korak, Son of Tarzan #46, then moved to Weird Worlds #1–5, then continued with an adaptation of Pellucidar in #6–7. Another Pellucidar story appeared in Tarzan Family #66. Dark Horse Comics reprinted this in trade paperback in 2017.

Pellucidar has appeared in one movie adaptation. The first novel was filmed as At the Earth's Core (1976), directed by Kevin Connor with Doug McClure as David Innes and Peter Cushing as Abner Perry.

Pellucidar appears in the Tarzan, Lord of the Jungle episode "Tarzan at the Earth's Core".

The 1996 pilot of the TV series Tarzan: The Epic Adventures also features Pellucidar, as well as the character Jana from the novel Tarzan at the Earth's Core. This story also features a race of Mahars who are able to transform into humanoid form. Also, in the 1996 novelization of Tarzan: The Epic Adventures by R. A. Salvatore, based on the teleplay for the pilot of the series, Pellucidar is featured in the later part of the story. The story is inspired by The Return of Tarzan and Tarzan at the Earth's Core.

Pellucidar appears in a few episodes of the Disney cartoon series The Legend of Tarzan, loosely inspired by Tarzan at the Earth's Core. In the show, however, Pellucidar is merely described as being a region below Africa where dinosaurs still live. None of the characteristics of it described in the novels are seen and the Mahars, Sagoths, Horibs, prehistoric mammals, stone age humans, and characters are not seen in this version of the inner world. In the episode "Tarzan and the Hidden World", Tarzan leads Professor Porter into Pellucidar so he can become famous before his rival, Professor Philander, who has also arrived in Africa. Professor Porter accidentally steals an egg from a T-rex and the dinosaur retaliates by chasing them. Philander's photographic proof of Pellucidar is ruined by a monkey who took photos with his camera. Pellucidar is mentioned again in "Tarzan and the Beast from Below". The episode revolves around some Velociraptors which escaped from Pellucidar and scare Terk.

Pellucidar is revisited by Tarzan and is the central location of the Dark Horse Comics crossover Tarzan vs. Predator: At the Earth's Core, where Tarzan faces off against the alien Predators in Pellucidar.

Pellucidar appears in the final episode of Tarzan and Jane along with King Kong.

== Influence ==
A tribute story, "Maureen Birnbaum at the Earth's Core", appeared in George Alec Effinger's Maureen Birnbaum, Barbarian Swordsperson.

Pellucidar was the major inspiration for Lin Carter's Zanthodon novels of the late 1970s and early 1980s, set in the vast cavern of Zanthodon beneath the Sahara desert.

The Hollow Earth milieu of Skartaris in the Warlord series of comic books by Mike Grell, published from 1976 to 1989, is essentially a translation of Pellucidar into the graphic medium, with the admixture of magic and elements of the Atlantis myth.

The hollow interior of Earth seen in the 2008 Asylum film Journey to the Center of the Earth bears some similarity to Pellucidar, although the film was intended as a film adaptation of a novel by Jules Verne.

The Hollow World of the fictional Dungeons & Dragons setting of Mystara shares many concepts from Pellucidar, such as the polar openings, the central sun, the floating moons, and the primitive cultures living in the internal surface.

In James Blaylock's The Digging Leviathan (1984), a pair of rival scientific teams compete to reach Pellucidar. However, the story concludes before their goal is attained. Blaylock's Zeuglodon revisits the Pellucidar theme, when a group of children attempt to rescue Giles Peach, one of the characters traveling to Pellucidar in The Digging Leviathan.

In Robert A. Heinlein's Number of the Beast, the protagonists visit an inside-out world in their continua craft and discuss whether they have reached Pellucidar.

In John Crowley's Little, Big (1981), a drug named Pellucidar is mentioned and appears to have an exhilarating and even aphrodisiac effect.

During the initial explorations of Lechuguilla Cave in the late 1980s, a chamber was named "Pellucidar" in honor of these stories.

In Philip José Farmer's "Riders of the Purple Wage", there is a concept known as "the Pellucidar Breakthrough".

In Roderick Gordon's Tunnels series, the Garden of the Second Sun is strongly based on Pellucidar.

The Hollow Earth concept was used by Vladimir Obruchev in his novel Plutonia, published in 1924, also inhabited by ancient life forms. Due to his scientific and geology career, Obruchev was not a fan of the Hollow Earth concept. However, Obruchev did use his novel to describe Pleistocene, Jurassic, and Carboniferous fauna.

== See also ==
- At the Earth's Core (1976 movie)
- Tarzan: The Epic Adventures (1996/1997 TV series)
- Hollow Earth
- Subterranean fiction
