= Tanar of Pellucidar =

1928 Book by Edgar Rice Burroughs

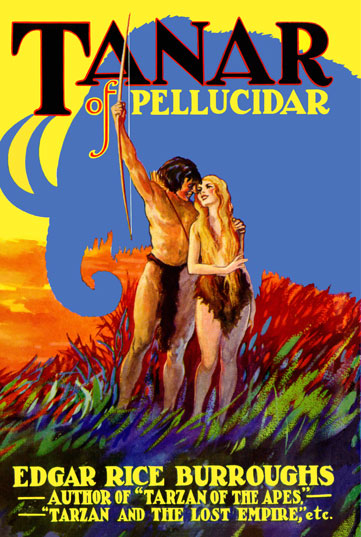
- Dust-jacket illustration of Tanar of Pellucidar
- Author: Edgar Rice Burroughs
- Illustrator: Paul F. Berdanier
- Cover artist: Paul F. Berdanier
- Language: English
- Series: Pellucidar series
- Genre: Adventure
- Publisher: Metropolitan Books
- Publication date: 1930
- Publication place: United States
- Media type: Print (Hardback)
- Pages: 312
- Preceded by: Pellucidar
- Followed by: Tarzan at the Earth's Core

Tanar of Pellucidar is a novel by American writer Edgar Rice Burroughs, the third in his series set in the interior world of Pellucidar. It first appeared as a six-part serial in The Blue Book Magazine from March–August 1929. It was first published in book form in hardcover by Metropolitan Books in May 1930.

== Plot summary ==
First paperback edition of Tanar of Pellucidar

The author's friend Jason Gridley is experimenting with a new radio frequency he dubs the Gridley Wave, via which he picks up a transmission sent by scientist Abner Perry, from the interior world of Pellucidar at the Earth's core, a realm discovered by the latter and his friend David Innes many years before inhabited by prehistoric creatures. There Innes and Perry have established an Empire of Pellucidar, actually a confederation of tribes, and attempted with mixed success to modernize the stone-age natives. Lately things have not gone well, and Innes is currently held captive in an enemy realm. Perry transmits a lengthy account of how this has come about, as reported by Innes's native comrade in arms Tanar, and appeals for aid from the outer world.

Tanar's narrative comprises the bulk of the novel. Innes had led an army to the relief of the member tribe of Thuria and the remnants of the Empire's former foes, the reptilian Mahars. Both had been attacked by a previously unknown people, the Korsars (corsairs), the scourge of the internal seas. These, it is eventually learned, are the descendants of outer world Moorish pirates who had penetrated Pellucidar centuries before through a natural polar opening connecting the outer and inner worlds. The empire's forces succeed in repulsing the Korsars, but the raiders retain as hostage Tanar, son of Innes’ ally Ghak of Sari. They hope to trade him for the secret of the empire's superior weaponry. Leaving his forces to construct ships to counter the enemy fleet, Innes and his comrade Ja of Anoroc set out alone to rescue Tanar, guided by their own prisoner, the Korsar Fitt.

On the enemy flagship Tanar is interrogated by the Cid, leader of the Korsars, and his ugly henchman Bohar the Bloody. The young warrior also encounters Stellara, supposedly the Cid's daughter, who attempts to intercede on behalf of Tanar and his fellow captives. A storm destroys the ship, and the crew takes to the lifeboats, leaving Tanar and Stellara adrift on the wreckage. Stellara confides to him that she is not really a Korsar, as her mother Allara was stolen by the Cid from the native island of Amiocap and she bears a birthmark proving she is actually the daughter of Fedol, her mother's former mate. Eventually the derelict ship drifts to Amiocap itself, but the island's suspicious inhabitants take the two for Korsar spies and imprison them in the village of Lar. Escaping, they by chance encounter Fedol, who recognizes Stellara by her birthmark and gives them refuge in his own village of Peraht. But Bohar's group of Korsars attacks Peraht and kidnaps Stellara, while Tanar falls prey to the Coripies, a cannibalistic subterranean race. Escaping again, Tanar kills Bohar and frees Stellara, to whom he avows his love. Their joy is short-lived, as she is then abducted by Jude of the nearby island of Hime, who had shared Tanar's captivity among the Coripies. Tanar pursues them to Hime, where they are overtaken by Bohar's crew. Seeing Tanar with Gura, a girl of Hime who has developed a crush on him, Stellara rejects him and reassumes her former role among the Korsars;

Tanar and Gura are taken in chains across the ocean to the Korsar city. There Tanar finds himself a fellow prisoner with David Innes and Ja of Anoroc, whose quest to succor him has miscarried. The three feign acquiescence to the Cid's demand they manufacture modern firearms for him, and so are given greater liberty. Meanwhile, Gura has discovered that Stellara, despite her jealous anger, still loves Tanar, and lets Tanar know. The party plans its escape and flees north with the reconciled Stellara. After confirming the existence of the polar opening they turn south again, bound for Sari, only to encounter a large party of pursuing Korsars, at which they split up in an attempt to ensure some at least can carry word back to the empire. Stellara, Tanar and Innes are recaptured, and the latter two each confined solitarily in lightless, snake-infested cells. Tanar, in his cell, eventually locates the opening through which the snakes enter, widens it, and achieves freedom. He locates Stellara in a heated faceoff with Bulf, the Korsar to whom the Cid has promised her; she swears to kill him and herself both rather than submit. Tanar intervenes and dispatches Bulf. He and his lover then leave the city in Korsar guise, and after many perils return to Sari, where they find Ja and Gura to have arrived safely as well.

After hearing the complete transmission, Jason Gridley pledges to lead an expedition to Pellucidar through the polar opening and rescue David Innes, thus setting the stage for the sequel Tarzan at the Earth's Core, a cross-over novel linking Burroughs’ Pellucidar and Tarzan series.

== Copyright ==
The copyright for this story has expired in Australia and in Canada, and thus now resides in the public domain there. The text is available via Project Gutenberg Australia and Faded Page, Canada. As the magazine version was published in 1929, it is now in the public domain in the United States.

Preceded by Pellucidar	Pellucidar series Tanar of Pellucidar	Succeeded by Tarzan at the Earth's Core
