= Land of Terror =

1944 Book by Edgar Rice Burroughs

- Dust-jacket illustration for Land of Terror
- Author: Edgar Rice Burroughs
- Language: English
- Series: Pellucidar
- Genre: Fantasy
- Publication date: 1944
- Publication place: United States
- Media type: Print (hardback)
- Preceded by: Back to the Stone Age
- Followed by: Savage Pellucidar

Land of Terror is a 1944 fantasy novel by American writer Edgar Rice Burroughs, the sixth in his series about the fictional "Hollow Earth" land of Pellucidar. It is the penultimate novel in the series and the last to be published during Burrough's lifetime. Unlike most of the other books in the Pellucidar series, this novel was never serially published in any magazine because it was rejected by all of Burroughs's usual publishers.

== Plot summary ==
The novel relates the adventures of David Innes on his return from Lo-Har to Sari in the wake of the events of Back to the Stone Age.
It is divided into five adventures:

- The Oog Women (chapters 1-4)
- Among the Jukans (chapters 5-15)
- With the Azar giants (chapters 16-18)
- Captured by the giant Ants (chapters 19-21)
- On the Floating Island of Ruva (chapters 22-28)

== Copyright ==
The copyright for this story has expired in Australia, and thus now resides in the public domain there. The text is available via Project Gutenberg Australia.

| Preceded by Back to the Stone Age | Pellucidar series Land of Terror | Succeeded by Savage Pellucidar |
