= Roy Krenkel =

American illustrator

- Born: Roy Gerald Krenkel; July 11, 1918
- Died: February 24, 1983 (aged 64)
- Area: Artist
- Pseudonym: RGK

Roy Gerald Krenkel (July 11, 1918 – February 24, 1983), who often signed his work RGK, was an American illustrator who specialized in fantasy and historical drawings and paintings for books, magazines and comic books.

== Influences and study ==
Krenkel was born July 11, 1918. His artwork revealed the strong influence of artist Norman Lindsay, in addition to Franklin Booth, Joseph Clement Coll and J. Allen St. John. In 1939, he was attending Cooper Union's Art School. Before World War II he studied with George Bridgman at the Art Students League of New York. During the War he served as a Private in the U.S. Army in the Philippines. His enlistment papers of January 23, 1942, record him as living in Queens, as having graduated from high school, and as single, without dependents, employed as an actor.

"Food for Thought" (Incredible Science-Fiction #32) by Al Williamson with Roy Krenkel

After the War, Krenkel attended Burne Hogarth's classes at the Cartoonists and Illustrators School, which became the School of Visual Arts. There he met a group of young cartoonists, including Joe Orlando, Frank Frazetta and Al Williamson. Frazetta noted, "I met Roy Krenkel back in 1949 or 1950, and he has never ceased to be a constant source of inspiration to me—a truly conscientious artist who will not tolerate incompetence."

Krenkel sometimes collaborated with Frazetta and Williamson on pages the trio drew for EC Comics particularly in Weird Science, Weird Fantasy and Weird Science-Fantasy. His splash page contribution to Williamson's "Food for Thought" (Incredible Science Fiction 32, November–December 1955), a highly detailed alien landscape, is often regarded as a peak achievement in comic book illustration. Krenkel only drew one solo story for EC, the unsigned "Time to Leave" (Incredible Science Fiction 31, September–October 1955), displaying a futuristic cityscape of architectural splendors. Krenkel inked many of Williamson's comic stories for Marvel and American Comics Group in the 1950s as well.

He was known for regarding his own work as disposable and unimportant.

== Magazines and paperbacks ==
Krenkel provided illustrations to several science fiction magazines. The writer Harry Harrison recalled, "Krenkel was a master penciler. I know. When he shared a studio with me and Wally Wood, I inked one of his illustrations for Marvel Science Fiction magazine. The influence of fine artists Norman Lindsay and Alma Tadema can be seen in his work."

His work includes 23 paperback book cover paintings as well as frontispieces for Edgar Rice Burroughs and other fantasy writers published by Donald A. Wollheim at Ace Books. During the late 1960s, he created cover paintings for DAW Books and Lancer Books. When Lancer revived Robert E. Howard's creation Conan the Barbarian, with revisions by L. Sprague de Camp, Krenkel was cited by cover artist Frazetta as a consultant. He also created preliminary roughs which Frazetta modified and used when he painted covers for Warren Publishing's Creepy and Eerie. Krenkel drew one-page "Creepy's Loathsome Lore" and "Eerie's Monster Gallery" stories as well as rough layouts and inks for "H2O World" with collaborator Al Williamson.

During the 1970s, he illustrated both covers and interiors for Howard's The Sowers of the Thunder and The Road of Azrael, published by Donald M. Grant. It was at this time Krenkel created seven special paintings for a limited edition portfolio illustrating the Seven Wonders of the Ancient World. He also contributed to several science fiction fanzines, including Richard A. Lupoff's Xero, the Burroughs-oriented ERBdom and Amra, devoted to the works of Howard.

Danton Burroughs, the grandson of Edgar Rice Burroughs, commented, "Roy Krenkel was a key factor in the 1960s revival of my grandfather's writings. Krenkel's illustrations forever secured his position as one of the all-time great Edgar Rice Burroughs illustrators."

Following his death, Krenkel's friends Archie Goodwin and Al Williamson created the story "Relic", published in Epic Illustrated #27, as a tribute to him.

== Awards ==
In 1963, Krenkel won the Hugo Award for Best Professional Artist.

== Works illustrated ==
- Great Cities of the Ancient World (1972, Doubleday) by L. Sprague de Camp
- Cities & Scenes from the Ancient World (1974, Owlswick Press). Hardcover of RGK drawings
- The Seven Wonders of the Ancient World by Roy G. Krenkel (1975, Christopher Enterprises). Signed/Numbered Limited Edition of 1000 Portfolios - 7 Prints in each
- Swordsmen and Saurians: From the Mesozoic to Barsoom (1989, Eclipse Books) Introduction by W Stout. Soft/hardcover of RGK drawings
- RGK: The Art of Roy G. Krenkel (2005, Vanguard) by J. David Spurlock. Soft/hardcover of RGK drawings
