= J. Allen St. John =

American author, artist and illustrator (1872-1957)

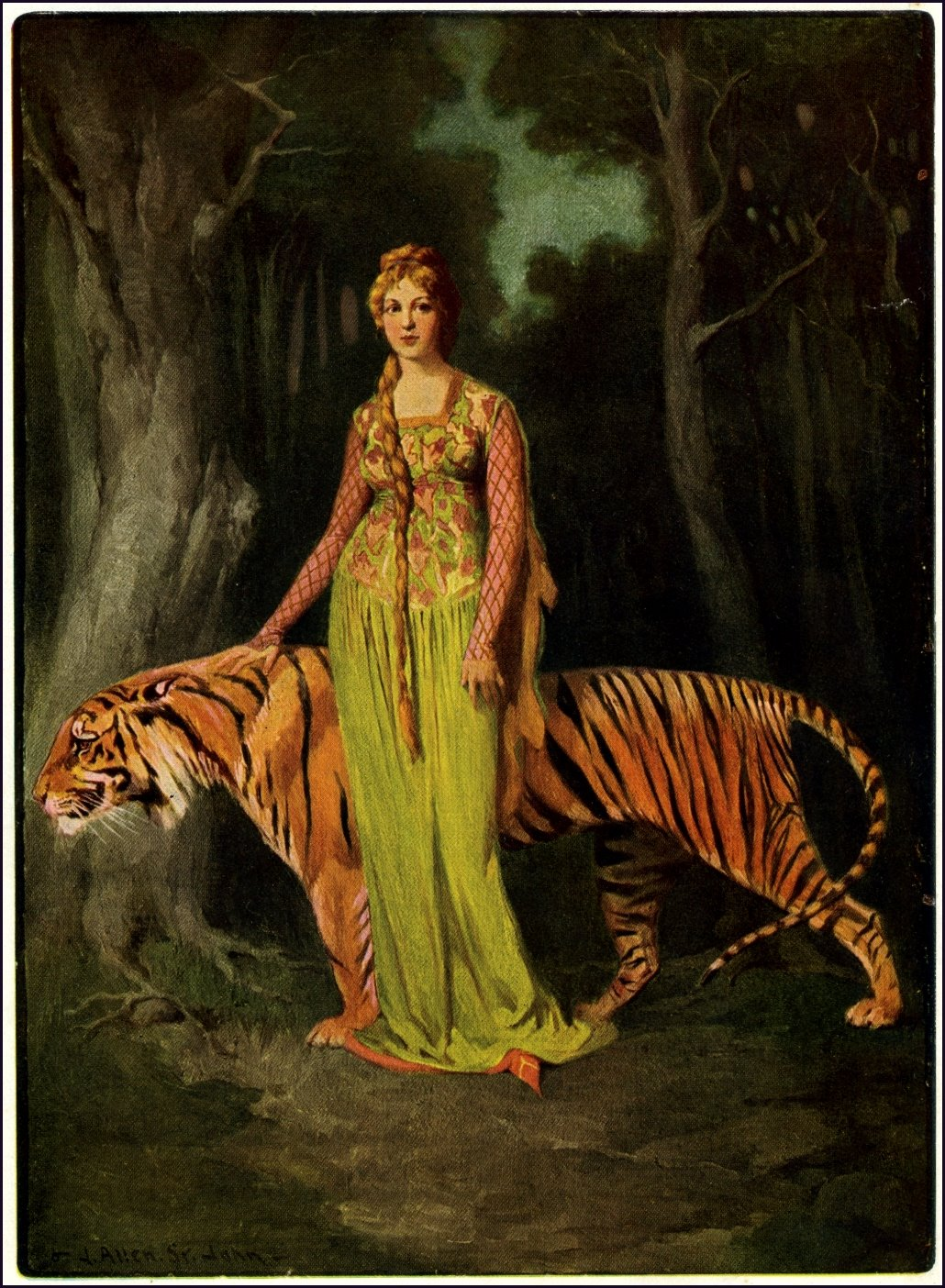
Frontispiece to 1905 edition of The Face in the Pool, written and illustrated by J. Allen St. John, published by A.C. McClurg & Co.

James Allen St. John (October 1, 1872 – May 23, 1957) was an American author, artist and illustrator. He is especially remembered for his illustrations for the novels of Edgar Rice Burroughs, although he illustrated works of many types. He taught at the Chicago Art Institute and with the American Academy of Art. He is considered by many to be 'The Godfather of Modern Fantasy Art'. His most famous disciples were Roy Krenkel and Frank Frazetta, the latter of whom has also been styled as the grandmaster of the Genre.

St. John was born in Chicago. His grandfather Hilliard Hely had graduated from Trinity College Dublin and was a portrait painter; his mother Susan Hely studied at the Art Institute of Chicago, the Ecole des Beaux-Arts in Paris and the National Academy of Design in New York, before opening a portrait studio.

St. John's artistic career began in 1898. He studied at the Art Students League of New York. The league included William Merritt Chase, F.V. Du Mond, George de Forest Brush, H. Siddons Mowbray, Carol Beckwith and Kenyan Cox. This was followed by his first commercial relationship with the New York Herald. During this period he spent time in Paris from 1906 to 1908 at the Académie Julian, then moved to Chicago around 1912 and would eventually live at Tree Studios art colony until his death. By this time, He had already produced his best-known work for this publisher back in 1905, The Face in the Pool, which he had both written and illustrated.

While in Chicago he became close friends with artist Louis Grell. Here he began his work with the publisher A.C. McClurg & Co., where he was contracted to illustrate Burrough’s The Beasts of Tarzan in 1916.

During WWI he created military recruitment posters and Liberty Bonds.

His work was also published in Amazing Stories and Fantastic Adventures magazines.

== Teaching ==
St. John had taught at the New York School of Art in the 1890s. In 1917 he began to teach at the Art Institute of Chicago; in later years he taught at the Businessmen's Art Association in Chicago and the American Academy of Art in Chicago.

== Publications ==
St. John’s illustrations appeared in many of Burrough’s works, including The Moon Maid (1926), The Master Mind of Mars (c1928), Tarzan and the Golden Lion, Tarzan and the Jewels of Opar, Thuvia: Maid of Mars, and Warlord of Mars.

His art work also appeared in works by Edith Ogden Harrison (The Lady of the Snows, 1912), Harold Bell Wright (The Re-Creation of Brian Kent, 1919), George Washington Ogden (Claim Number One, 1922), and Clarence Edward Mulford (Bring Me His Ears, 1922).

In the 1920s his work was published in several magazines including Colliers, The Rotarian, and Liberty; in later decades he was published in Boy's World, Amazing Stories, Fantastic Adventures, Other Worlds, and Mystic Magazine.

== Family life ==
He married Ellen May Munger on November 11, 1905.
