= Bessie Toner =

American actress

Elizabeth "Bessie" Toner (1885-1951) was a motion picture and theater actress in the early 20th century.

== Theater ==
Toner was married to actor Harry Childs by 1904. They were in the play The Sign of the Cross which toured beginning in the fall of 1904.

She was in the cast of The College Widow, a comedy satire of college life, produced by George Ade. The theatrical presentation was performed at the McDonough Theater in Oakland, California in November 1906. Louise Rutter appeared in the title role.

The Henry Wilson Savage Company, with the troupe of The College Widow, arrived in Portland, Maine by boat on August 24, 1906. The comedy was given in Portland before audiences at the Jefferson Theater. It also was staged in Kennebec County, Maine, at the Opera House. The stock company's travels took them west to Fresno, California and Winnipeg, Manitoba, in addition to Oakland.

In August 1908 she replaced Laura Nelson Hall in the role of Pamela, in a production of Girls at Daly's Theater on Broadway. A Clyde Fitch farce, the comedy made the run of the Shubert Theater chain. It was presented in La Crosse, Wisconsin in October 1908 prior to an engagement in St. Louis, Missouri.

Toner acted at the Union Square (New York City) Theatre of Benjamin Franklin Keith in Tricked in April 1913. She was joined on stage by actor Albert Gran.

== Motion Pictures ==
Toner made The Broken Toy, a two-reel heart interest drama with Violet Mersereau, in 1915. The movie is about a dancer who marries a millionaire and fears that he will no longer love her if she loses her ability to dance.

She plays a bar maid in the National Film Corporation of America movie Tarzan of the Apes (film) (1918). Filmed at Griffith Park, the production took six months to complete. Elmo Lincoln and Enid Markey are the leading actors in the cast.

Toner's other screen credits are for The Turn of the Tide (1914), Human Hearts (1914), The Millionaire Engineer (1915), An All Around Mistake (1915), and The Romance of Tarzan (1918).

With the advent of radio and motion picture sound, Toner established a successful second career in her later years as a voice teacher.

== Personal life ==
Elizabeth Toner married S. Russell Chesley, a businessman and socialite in 1914. She had two sons, Harry Childs Jr., from her first marriage, and Russell Chesley Jr., from her second. She moved with her family to Los Angeles in 1918 to pursue her acting career. Her grandson, Russell H. Chesley, is an entertainment industry executive and motion picture writer and producer
