= Admiral Bristol =

Admiral Bristol may refer to:

- Augustus Hervey, 3rd Earl of Bristol (1724–1779), British admiral and politician
- Arthur L. Bristol, Jr. (1886–1942), vice admiral in the U.S. Navy
- Mark Lambert Bristol (1868–1939), rear admiral in the U.S. Navy
