= Kathleen Kirkham =

American actress

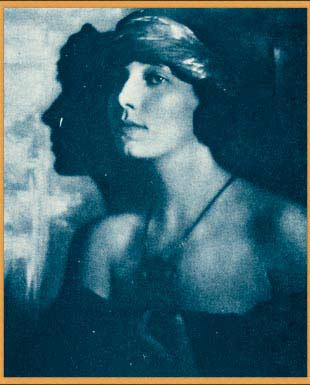
- Publicity photo of Kirkham from Who's Who on the Screen (1920)
- Born: Kathleen Kirkham; April 15, 1895; Menominee, Michigan, U.S.
- Died: November 7, 1961 (aged 66); Santa Barbara, California, U.S.
- Resting place: Hollywood Forever Cemetery
- Years active: 1904–1926
- Spouse: William H. Woodruff (m. 1917; died 1947)

Kathleen Kirkham Woodruff (April 15, 1895 – November 7, 1961) was an American actress on stage and in silent films.

== Career ==
Kathleen Kirkham was born on April 15, 1895, to Mrs. L.B. Kirkham, who was a stage actress prior to her marriage.

Kirkham began her stage career at the age of nine in Menominee. She was the leading lady, playwright, producer, and manager. When her family moved to Los Angeles she acted in plays in Burbank, California. At the time it was a center of theatrical life. She was featured in productions such as The Virginian and The Squaw Man, with actor Dustin Farnum.

The Kangaroos, a play produced by Frank Egan, debuted at the Little Theater (Helen Hayes Theatre) on July 20, 1921. Neely Edwards starred with Kirkham, who was cast as a tall woman who was in love with a shrimp aviator, played by Edwards. Kirkham was in a one-act thriller, The Retake, which was staged at the California Theater in August 1921. The play entertained those who also came to see Betty Compson in the film For Those We Love (1921). Kirkham's co-stars were Phil Ryder and Arthur Clare. In August 1925 Kirkham was in a production of Redemption at the Potboiler Art Theater in Los Angeles.

Kirkham was blonde and considered one of the best-dressed actresses. In most of her films she appears in fifteen to eighteen changes of clothing. Kirkham became widely known after the release of The Eyes of the World (1915). Based on a novel by Harold Bell Wright, it was one of the highly regarded films of 1915. In the drama Kirkham plays the part of Mrs Taine, The Age.

In July 1920 Kirkham vacationed at Balboa Beach, California, and read books and stories as a prelude to selecting material for motion pictures to be produced by her own film company. It was then being organized.

Kirkham is in the cast of the screen version of The White Moth (1924). Written by Izola Forrester, the movie was produced by First National Pictures. Barbara La Marr and Ben Lyon are among the featured players in a melodrama that is set in both New York City and Paris, France.

Kirkham returned to movies in 1925 following a two-year absence. Her first effort was in the role of Beatrice Selignac in Sackcloth and Scarlet (1925), a film produced by Henry King. She played the companion of Mary Brian in A Regular Fellow (1925), a Paramount Pictures comedy release.

== Legal action ==
In 1924 Kirkham sued the William Fox vaudeville company for failure to pay $750 it owed her as an employee. Another $350 was requested for a motion picture wardrobe which she had purchased. Fox countered Kirkham's action by asserting that the actress had asked for, and was granted, rescission from her contract, before performing the services specified by it. Kirkham was granted a full judgment against Fox, but the company asked for a rehearing in September 1924.

== Later years and death ==
In July 1934 Kirkham was working as a teller at Security-First National Bank in southern California. The 1940 census lists her and her husband as living at 1135 South Windsor Boulevard in Los Angeles.

Kathleen Kirkham died in Santa Barbara, California, on November 7, 1961. She is buried at Hollywood Forever Cemetery. At the time of her death, Kirkham was working as a cook.

== Partial filmography ==
- The Clean Gun (1917)
- The Devil's Assistant (1917)
- A Modern Musketeer (1918)
- A Diplomatic Mission (1918)
- Tarzan of the Apes (1918) - Alice Clayton - Lady Greystoke
- For Husbands Only (1918)
- He Comes Up Smiling (1918)
- The Romance of Tarzan (1918)
- Arizona (1918)
- The Married Virgin (1918)
- Josselyn's Wife (1919)
- The Master Man (1919)
- The Beauty Market (1919)
- The Beloved Cheater (1919)
- The Gay Lord Quex (1919)
- Her Five-Foot Highness (1920)
- When Dawn Came (1920)
- Number 99 (1920)
- Dollar for Dollar (1920)
- The Little 'Fraid Lady (1920)
- Parlor, Bedroom and Bath (1920)
- Her Five-Foot Highness (1920)
- Beau Revel (1921)
- Nobody's Kid (1921)
- The Innocent Cheat (1921)
- The Sky Pilot (1921)
- The Foolish Matrons (1921)
- Pilgrims of the Night (1921)
- The Adventures of Tarzan (1921)
- One Eighth Apache (1922)
- Back to Yellow Jacket (1922)
- The Bolted Door (1923)
- Other Men's Daughters (1923)
- The Lonely Road (1923)
- The White Moth (1924)
- Her Honor, the Governor (1926)
- The Isle of Retribution (1926)
