= Tarzan of the Apes (1918 film) =

1918 film directed by Scott Sidney

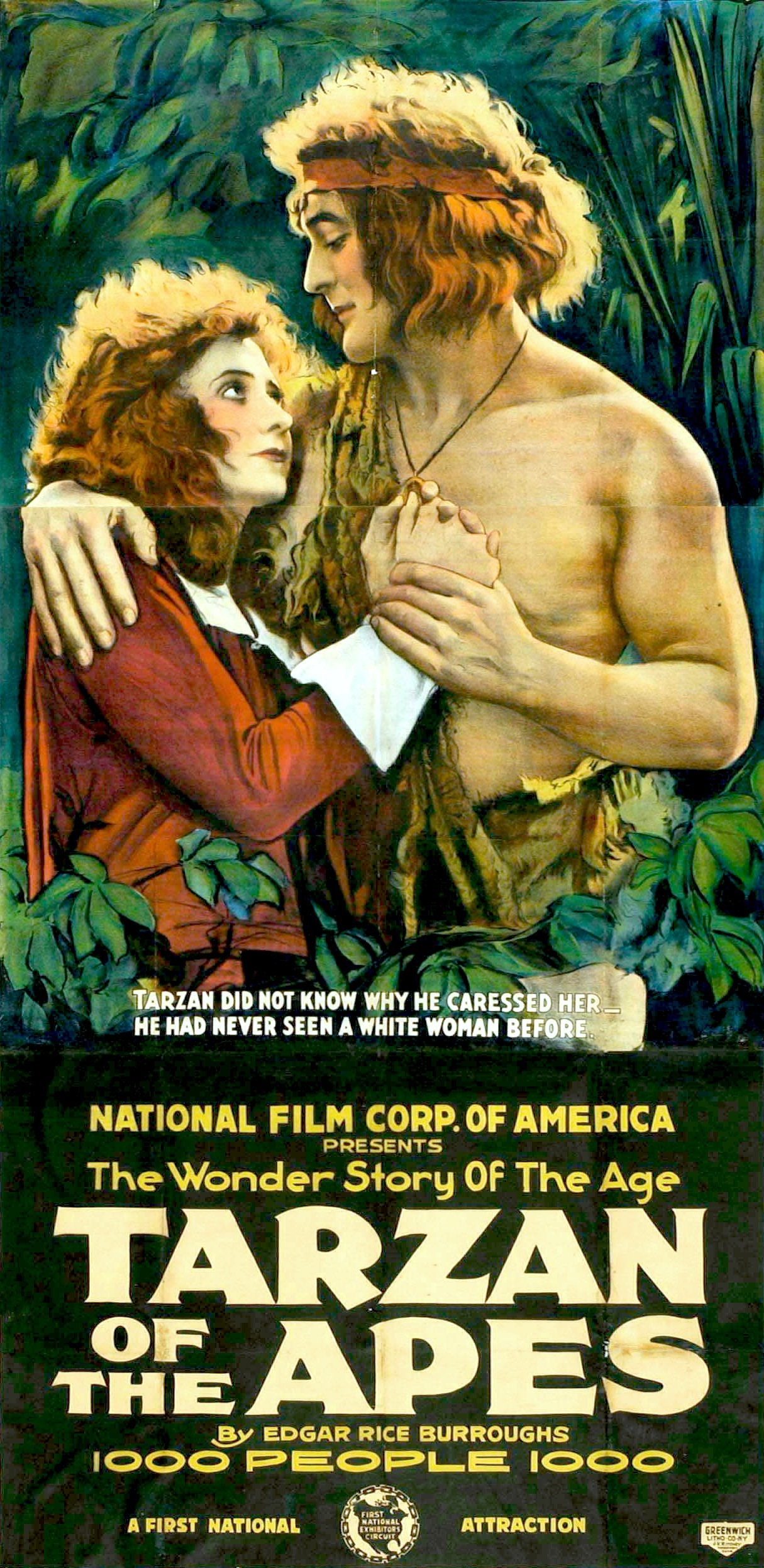
- Theatrical release three-sheet poster
- Directed by: Scott Sidney
- Written by: Fred Miller and Lois Weber (adaptation)
- Based on: Tarzan of the Apes by Edgar Rice Burroughs
- Produced by: William Parsons
- Starring: Elmo Lincoln; Enid Markey; George B. French; Gordon Griffith
- Cinematography: Enrique Juan Vallejo
- Edited by: Isadore Bernstein
- Production company: National Film Corporation of America
- Distributed by: First National
- Release dates: January 27, 1918 (Broadway, New York)
- Running time: Originally: 120+ min, Available: 61 min
- Country: United States
- Language: Silent (English intertitles)
- Box office: $1.5 million

Tarzan of the Apes is a 1918 American action/adventure silent film directed by Scott Sidney starring Elmo Lincoln, Enid Markey, George B. French and Gordon Griffith.

It was the first Tarzan film ever made and is based on Edgar Rice Burroughs' original 1912 novel Tarzan of the Apes. The film adapts only the first part of the novel, the remainder becoming the basis for the sequel, The Romance of Tarzan. The film is considered the most faithful to the novel of all the film adaptations. Its most notable plot change is the introduction of the character Binns and his role in bringing the Porters to Africa; the novel brought them there through the improbable coincidence of a second mutiny.

The role of Tarzan was given to Gordon Griffith, one of the best child actors of the time, and to Elmo Lincoln, an actor who specialized in "strong man" roles. Enid Markey was the first Jane. Especially for Griffith and Lincoln the film represented a huge personal success, which gave them the opportunity to shoot other important films and guaranteed their presence in three sequels: The Romance of Tarzan (1918), The Son of Tarzan (1920), and The Adventures of Tarzan (1921).

== Plot ==
Tarzan of the Apes (1918)

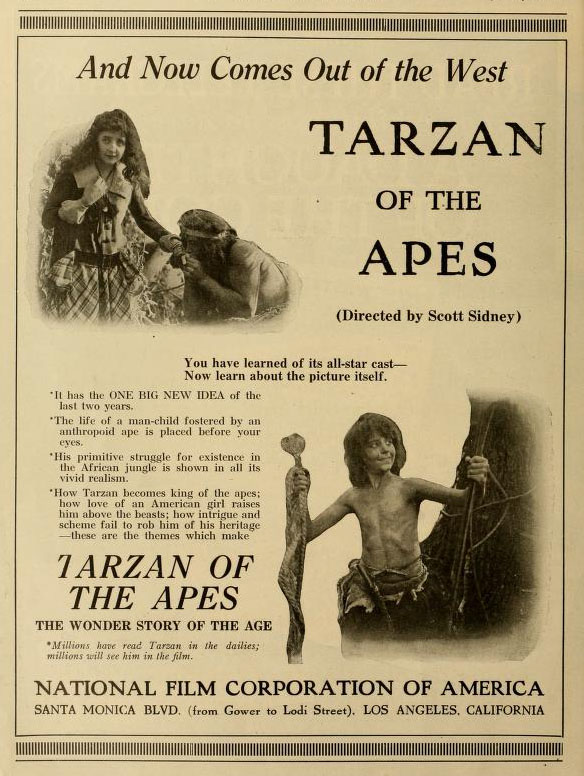
Advertisement (1918)

John and Alice Clayton, Lord and Lady Greystoke, are passengers on the Fuwalda, a ship bound for Africa. When the vessel is taken over by mutineers the sailor Binns saves them from being murdered, but they are marooned on the tropical coast. After their deaths their infant son is adopted by Kala, an ape, who raises him as her own. The young Tarzan grows to maturity among the apes, becoming their king. Binns, returning to find the Claytons after ten years’ captivity among the Arabs, discovers the ape man and travels to England to report his survival to his family. An expedition led by scientist Professor Porter is launched to investigate. Meanwhile, Kala has been killed by a native, who is killed in turn by the now-adult Tarzan. The villagers kidnap Porter's daughter Jane; Tarzan rescues and romances her, and she comes to accept his love.

== Cast ==
- Elmo Lincoln as Tarzan
- Enid Markey as Jane Porter
- True Boardman as John Clayton, Lord Greystoke
- Kathleen Kirkham as Alice Clayton, Lady Greystoke
- George B. French as Binns, a sailor
- Gordon Griffith as Tarzan, younger
- Colin Kenny as William Cecil Clayton
- Thomas Jefferson as Professor Porter
- Bessie Toner as Bar Maid
- Jack Wilson as Captain of the Fuwalda
- Louis Morrison as Innkeeper
- Eugene Pallette
- Fred L. Wilson
- Madame Sul-Te-Wan as Esmeralda (Jane's Maid)(uncredited)
- Stellan Windrow as Tarzan (stunt sequences, uncredited)

== Production ==
Burroughs sold the film rights to William Parson for $5,000 plus stock worth $50,000 plus 10% of the gross, in a period when film rights were normally sold only for $100 to $500, with rights eventually reverting to Burroughs.

Tarzan of the Apes was filmed in 1917 in Morgan City, Louisiana, utilizing Louisiana swamps as a stand-in for the African jungle.

A large portion of Griffith's role as young Tarzan is played in the nude, making Tarzan of the Apes one of the first films to feature a named actor in a nude scene. Most shots featuring Griffith in the nude are framed to hide his genitals, with the exception of one shot in which his penis is briefly visible. The film also includes brief scenes of female toplessness.

For the adult version of Tarzan, Stellan Windrow was first cast in the role and filmed a number of the film's stunt sequences involving swinging through trees. Due to his enlistment to fight in the First World War, Windrow was forced to withdraw from the film and Lincoln was cast to replace him. However, most of Windrow's stunt sequences were retained in the final film.

== Reception ==
Like many American films of the time, Tarzan of the Apes was subject to cuts by city and state film censorship boards. For showing in Chicago, its Board of Censors cut: "in Reel 1, the captain shooting man and his falling, two scenes of men with captain being shot and falling, striking man on head, Reel 3, scene of boy being frightened by lion and jumping up showing his sex, woman standing over kettle showing breasts, Reel 5, first two scenes of maid on man's lap in closet, three choking scenes, Reel 7, two closeups of Negro leering at woman and four scenes where he carries her off."
