= American Pluck =

1925 film

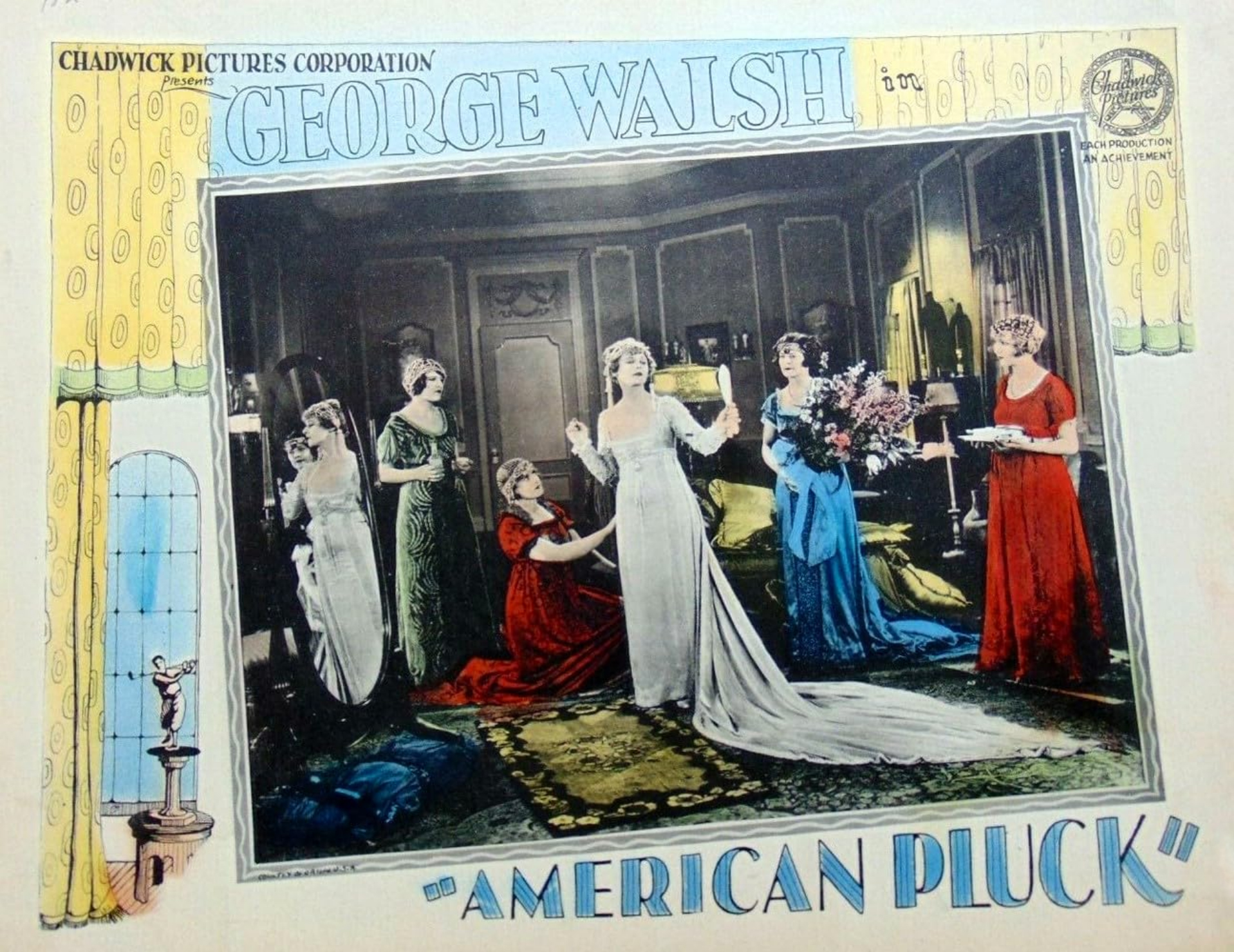
- Lobby card
- Directed by: Richard Stanton
- Written by: Ralph Spence
- Based on: Blaze Derringer by Eugene P. Lyle
- Produced by: Chadwick Pictures
- Starring: George Walsh; Wanda Hawley
- Cinematography: H. Lyman Broening; George Baxter
- Edited by: Sam Zimbalist
- Distributed by: Film Booking Offices of America(FBO)
- Release date: 12 September 1925
- Running time: 56 minutes
- Country: United States
- Language: Silent (English intertitles)

American Pluck is a 1925 American silent action comedy film directed by Richard Stanton. American Pluck was Stanton's last film. It stars George Walsh and Wanda Hawley. It was produced by I. E. Chadwick Productions and distributed by Film Booking Offices of America.

== Plot ==
As described in a film magazine reviews, Blaze Derringer is expelled from college for his wild exploits. His father casts him out, advising him not to return unless he has earned $5,000 by his own efforts within a year. He engages in a prize fight and again meets the girl he had previously rescued from a cabaret fight. She is Princess Alicia of Bargonia and he returns to her country with her. There he thwarts Count Verensky, who has plotted to win her throne. Blaze rescues her from her abductors and wins a wife and a throne.

== Cast ==
- George Walsh as Blaze Derringer
- Wanda Hawley as Princess Alicia
- Sidney De Gray as Count Birkhaff
- Frank Leigh as Count Verensky
- Thomas Wilson as Jefferson Lee
- Leo White as Lord Raleigh
- Dan Mason as American Consul

== Preservation ==
A print of American Pluck survives in a private collection.
