= The Mating =

The Mating may refer to:

- The Mating, a 1915 silent film starring Bessie Barriscale, Lew Cody, and Enid Markey, about a country girl going to college and falling in love
- The Mating, a 1918 silent film starring Gladys Leslie and Herbert Rawlinson, about the daughter of an inventor meeting a trouble-plagued novelist
