= Andy Briggs =

English author and screenwriter (born 1972)

- Born: Andrew Briggs; 27 September 1972 (age 54); Prescot, Lancashire, England
- Occupations: Author and Screenwriter
- Relatives: Peter Briggs (brother)
- Writing career
- Pen name: M.G. Cole (for the DCI Garrick book series)
- Period: 1991–present
- Notable works: Hero.com; Villain.net
- Website: andybriggs.co.uk

Andrew Briggs (born 27 September 1972) is an English author and screenwriter. He wrote the Hero.com series and the Villain.net young adult novels, which are due to be developed into a television series.

Briggs career began as an uncredited writer working on story development for Highlander: The Series in 1991. Since then he has worked alone and with his brother Peter Briggs on a number of projects, including the Stan Lee and Robert Evans Paramount Pictures project Foreverman. More recent television work has included story development for the Sci-Fi Channel, BKN Kids and Disney XD.

In the mid-2000s he did some writing for comics, and began to develop his Hero.com/Villain.net series of young adult novels. This led to a new series of young adult Tarzan novels.

Briggs has acknowledged Gordon Boshell's Captain Cobwebb books as an early influence. He would often go to places to experience how it feels.

== Credits ==
=== TV & film ===
- Passage of the Four (aka Screaming Night) (2002 film): writer
- Rise of the Gargoyles (2009 TV film): writer
- Ghost Town (2009 TV film): writer
- Dark Relic (2010 TV film): writer
- Blake: Double Identity (2011 TV Series): head writer
- The Philadelphia Experiment (2012 TV film): writer
- Legendary (2013): writer and executive producer
- Kong: King of the Apes (2016 TV Series): writer (season 1 episode 8: "Bionic Arms Race")
- Crowhurst (2017 feature film): writer
- Redcon-1 (2018 feature film): special thanks
- Supervized (2019 feature film): writer
- The Bastard King (2020 film): narrator
- A Conspiracy Classic - The Making of the Philadelphia Experiment (2020 documentary): himself
- King of Shadows (2021 film): writer
- Karate (2025 TV series): head writer

=== Comics ===
- Kong: King of Skull Island (2007–2008) ISBN 978-1-905692-34-7
- Ritual (2009) ISBN 978-1-905692-33-0
- DinoCorps (2012) ISBN 978-1905692804
- Ritual 2: The Resurrection (2015) ISBN 978-1909276536
- Madison Dark (2018) ISBN 978-1912700233
- MEAT (2018) ISBN 978-1912700257
- Cold War (2019) ISBN 978-1912700271

=== Novels ===
- Hero.com
  - Rise of the Heroes (June 2008)
  - Virus Attack (October 2008)
  - Crisis Point (July 2009)
  - Chaos Effect (March 2010)
- Villain.net
  - Council of Evil (June 2008)
  - Dark Hunter (October 2008)
  - Power Surge (July 2009)
  - Collision course (March 2010)

- Ritual (Note: Co-written with Steve Horvath.) (July 2009) ISBN 978-1905692330
- Tarzan:
  - The Greystoke Legacy (June 2011) ISBN 978-0-571-27238-9
  - The Jungle Warrior (July 2012) ISBN 978-0-571-27353-9
  - The Savage Lands (February 2013) ISBN 978-0-571-27353-9
- Edge:
  - Warrior Number One (November 2011) ISBN 978-1-4451-0707-3
- Project X:
  - Reign of the Practari (April 2015) ISBN 978-0-19-831045-7
  - Steam Pirates (April 2015) ISBN 978-0-19-831046-4
- How to be an International Spy: Your Training Manual, Should You Choose to Accept it (September 2015) ISBN 978-1743607725
- Spy Quest - Polybius: The Urban Legend (November 2015) ISBN 978-0993283109
- CTRL+S (November 2019) ISBN 978-1409184652
- Marlow (November 2020) ISBN 979-8555934215
- The Majestic Files:
  - Epicenter (December 2020) ISBN 979-8699480371
  - Chem (March 2021) ISBN 979-8715274915
  - Phantom Land (August 2022) ISBN 979-8846132702
  - Point Nemo (August 2022) ISBN 979-8846130869
  - Trigger Effect (June 2025) ISBN 979-8290319223
  - The Carrier (January 2027)
- Drone Racer (August 2022) ISBN 979-8843786168
- The Inventory:
  - Iron Fist (August 2022) ISBN 979-8846115996
  - Gravity (August 2022) ISBN 979-8846119109
  - Black Knight (August 2022) ISBN 979-8846122642
  - Winter Storm (August 2022) ISBN 979-8846125179
- Terror Tales of the West Country (Note: He only wrote one of the short stories.) (October 2022) ISBN 978-1845832087
- Monsterville (October 2023) ISBN 978-1915860729

==== As M.G. Cole ====
- DCI Garrick:
  - Slaughter of Innocents (March 2021) ISBN 979-8727355893
  - Murder is Skin Deep (April 2021) ISBN 979-8732789065
  - The Dead Will Talk (May 2021) ISBN 979-8511387291
  - Dead Man's Game (October 2021) ISBN 979-8490635215
  - Cleansing Fires (July 2022) ISBN 979-8842228447
  - The Dead Don't Pay (December 2022) ISBN 979-8371371881
  - A Murder of Lies (August 2023) ISBN 979-8857146422
  - Siren's Call (August 2024) ISBN 979-8336293326
  - A Degree of Murder (August 2025) ISBN 979-8298799768
  - The White Horse (January 2026) ISBN 979-8245398174
  - Killing on Command (January 2027)

=== Picture books ===
- Tinch (May 2022) ISBN 978-1914926921
- Monster Knights (September 2022) ISBN 978-1915387417
