= Hero.com =

Novel series by Andy Briggs

Hero.com is a series of superhero novels by English screenwriter, graphic novelist, and author Andy Briggs. The novels are published through Oxford University Press in the United Kingdom and various other publishers in other countries.

The novels follow the exploits of four friends, Toby, Pete, Emily and Lorna. While surfing the internet, they discover the Hero.com website, and that they can temporarily download superpowers from the internet to use in the real world.

A spinoff series, Villain.net, soon followed. This series follows school bully Jake Hunter who discovers he has the ability to download villainous superpowers from the internet, leading to a scheme for world domination.

== Fictional plot synopsis ==
Toby, Pete, Emily and Lorna are four friends who stumble onto a website called Hero.com, which features nameless icons in a variety of superhero poses. The friends discover that when they click on an icon, they can temporarily download superpowers from the internet to use in the real world.

Around the same time, school bully Jake Hunter finds himself introduced to Villain.net, a website that allows him to download villainous powers for him to use in the real world.

Through these chance online discoveries, this quartet of friends and loner will respectively start down parallel but separate paths within a whole new side of their world that almost no one in it knows about, but even with the accessible powers from their respective websites, they will face challenging events, each one proving harder then the last.

== Books ==
Publishers
Country	Publisher
UK	Oxford University Press
USA	Walker Books
Australia	Oxford University Press
Canada	Oxford University Press
South Africa	Oxford University Press
Germany	Arena Books
Thailand	Bright Kids
Czech Republic	Computer Press
Romania	Rao Books
Bulgaria	Egmont
English Audio	W.F. Howes

=== Hero.com and Villain.net ===
==== Rise of the Heroes ====
Toby, Pete, Lorna, and Emily are just average kids—until they stumble upon a website called "Hero.com" that allows them to download powers that turn them into superheroes. At first, having the ability to fly, teleport, and shoot lasers from their eyes seems wonderful. But once the supervillain, Doc Tempest, kidnaps Toby and Lorna’s mom, everything takes a darker turn.

Now the heroes must band together and use their newly acquired skills—from super-strength to invisibility—to not only rescue their mom, but also doing the typical superhero activities like fighting evil and trying to save the world from total destruction.

The foursome soon figure out that "Villain.net" is out there too, recruiting teens for the dark side.

==== Virus Attack ====
Archfiends Basilisk and the Worm have thought of a plan so cunning it will strike fear into the heart of the bravest superhero. Combining their dastardly skills, they will infect Hero.com with a virus potent enough to cripple it and ultimately end in the destruction of the Hero HQ. Toby, Lorna, Pete and Emily are tasked to stop them. Hard enough at the best of times, but particularly tricky once Hero.com is on the blink and their superhero powers keep fluctuating. And when Pete is kidnapped and cryogenically frozen by the vile villains, things start going from bad to worse, which can cause their friendships to be torn apart soon. Another superpowered adventure from a master of pen and plot!

==== Crisis Point ====
The Hero Foundation is a shadow of its former self and Lord Eon - the most terrible supervillain ever - is still at large. Worse, he has hatched a plan to tear apart time. Toby and his superhero friends should be able to stop him . . . but Pete has woken from his coma a different person and Lorna has disappeared. In the titanic struggle that will follow, friendships will be tested and superhero powers and trusts are strained to the limit as time runs out for the world . . . literally . . .

==== Chaos Effect ====
Toby just wants to be a hero and stop the fiendish, schizophrenic cyborg, Nanomite, from turning all life into a synthesized world. But life keeps getting in the way. His sister has gone AWOL, his friend is obsessed with correcting his best mate who is a villain and a new, annoying, pair of downloaders are stealing all the limelight. How big or small does a problem have to be for them to take care of it? With civilization on the brink of disaster-which heroes will save the day?

===== Relationships in Hero.com =====
Throughout the series the characters of the two series lives have entwined. Lorna has dated Jake Hunter. A love triangle has developed between Emily, Pete and Toby. Emily now seems to be leaning towards Pete. And a new girl called Jen now fancies Toby.

Toby - Fancied Emily but eventually developed a crush on Jen (book 3 & 4)

Pete - Has always had a crush on Emily resulting in conflict between him and Toby, eventually Toby went for someone else leaving Pete and Emily. The conflict caused him to grow more villainous and was featured more heavily in the Villain.net books after book 2.

Emily - She initially is unsure whether she preferred Toby or Pete originally but is now leaning towards Pete.

Lorna - Has a crush on and Dates Jake Hunter (from Villain.Net). She appears less and less in the Hero.com books after book 2 and begins appearing more in the Villain.net books as she grows closer to Jake.

Jake Hunter - Has a crush on Lorna, but, is unsure how to react when he discovers that she and her friends are heroes (Book 2). His appearances in the Hero.com books are relatively minor, but he is mentioned a lot by Lorna.

=== Villain.net ===
==== Council of Evil ====
School bully Jake Hunter receives a mysterious email inviting him to join a scheme for world domination. With unlimited power and wealth at his fingertips, how can he resist? But to get it he has to become an arch-criminal, entangled in a plan that threatens the planet. And that could just be a step too far ... 'Council of Evil' is the first book in the action packed new anti-series 'VILLAIN.NET' - the perfect antidote to the series 'HERO.COM', also by screenwriter Andy Briggs.

==== Dark Hunter ====
Jake Hunter was once an ordinary schoolboy with a computer. Until he discovered Villain.net. Now he is an extraordinary schoolboy with a dark side, a bad attitude and an addiction to the villainous powers he can download from the website. And when Jake Hunter - aka the Hunter - breaks out of prison, he has one thing on his mind: revenge. He is going to get his family back, avenge himself on hero Psych, who has wiped all memory of him from their minds, and then destroy heroes and villains. But both the Hero Foundation and the Council of Evil have other plans for the vilest villain the world has ever seen. Both sides want him. Who will get him?

==== Power Surge ====
Schoolboy supervillain, Jake Hunter, has taken his seat on the Council of Evil. Now he will live his dream - exact revenge on the cruel world. But the cruel world has other plans, and they come in the shape of the Hero Foundation. Jake's not scared of the Hero Foundation. He even has a plan to turn it to the dark side. Until it gets a new member - Jake's own sister. Is he really so villainous as try to get her out of the way?

==== Collision Course ====
With the mightiest of superpowers almost within his grasp, being betrayed by almost every person he knows, Jake Hunter is on the edge of true villainous greatness, defeating most of the Council of Evil with ease. Nobody will be able to stop him from toppling the Foundation and Council of Evil once and for all, except for the possibility of every super plus enforcers ready to rumble. But the Dark Hunter is playing a high-stakes game with the world. He needs it to stop the moon. So, how far will he go to complete his plans? And who will he sacrifice for the ultimate power?

Relationships in Villain.Net

Jake - Fancies Lorna, started to fancy Orsina (book 4) but soon pulled away.

Lorna - Fancies Jake, dates him, breaks up with him, makes-up with him. (Disappeared from the Hero.com books after Book 2 and started appearing in the Villain. Net books from book 3.)

Orsina - First appeared in book 4 and fancied Jake.

Chameleon - Jake's nemesis, they are constantly trying to kill each other and their loved ones. Chameleon appeared in the early Hero.com books as a mentor figure to Toby, but they lost contact as Chameleon grows more obsessed with defeating Jake.
