= Other Men's Daughters (1923 film) =

1923 film

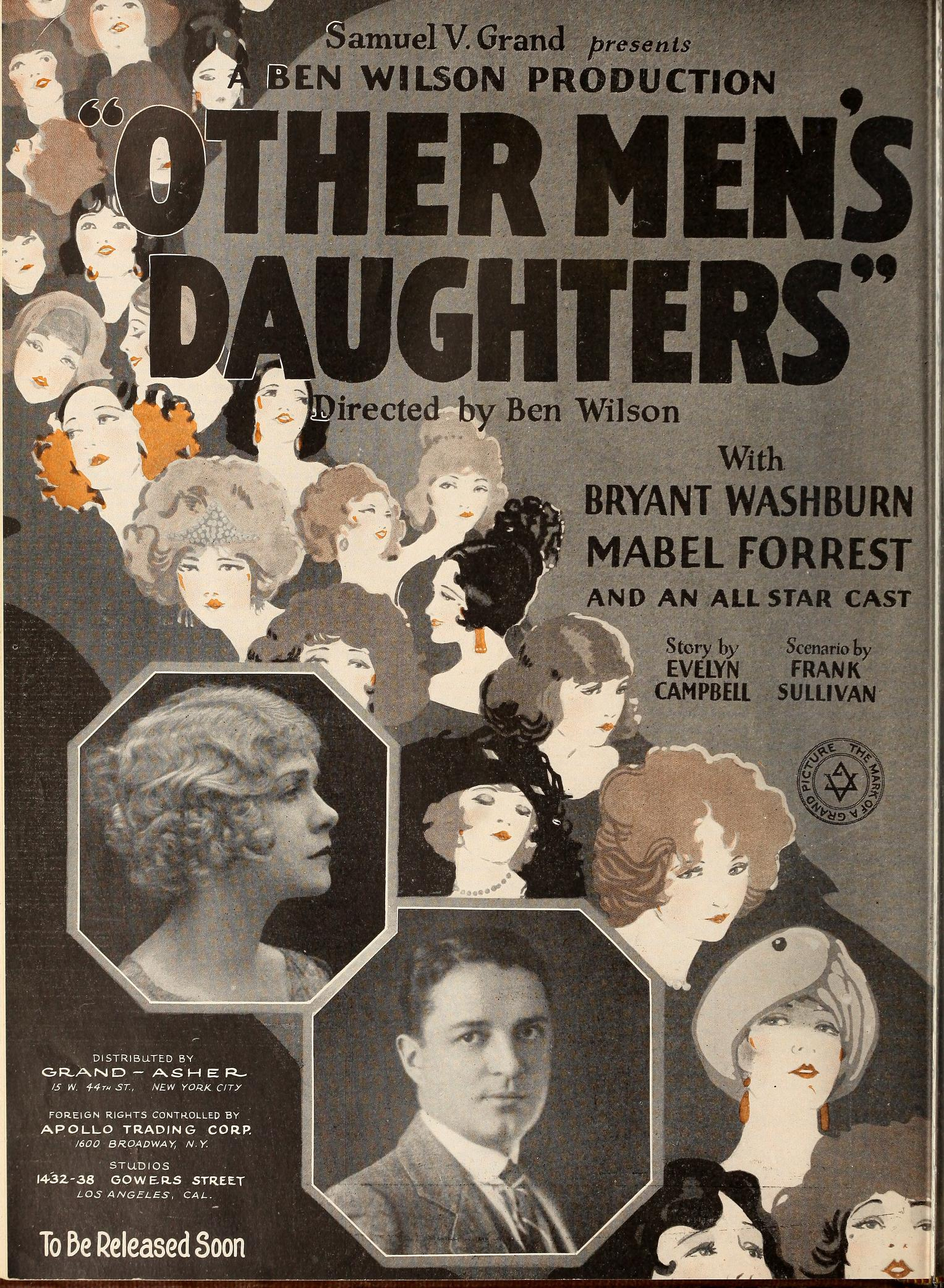
- Lobby card
- Directed by: Ben F. Wilson
- Written by: Evelyn Campbell; Frank Sullivan
- Produced by: Ben F. Wilson
- Starring: Bryant Washburn; Kathleen Kirkham; Wheeler Oakman
- Cinematography: Edward Linden; Jack Stevens
- Production company: Bryant Washburn Productions
- Distributed by: Grand Asher Distributing Corporation
- Release date: October 1923
- Running time: 60 minutes
- Country: United States
- Language: Silent (English intertitles)

Other Men's Daughters is a 1923 American silent drama film directed by Ben F. Wilson and starring Mabel Forrest, Bryant Washburn, Kathleen Kirkham, and Wheeler Oakman.

== Plot ==
As described in a film magazine review, Dorothy Kane is severely disciplined by her stern father who, however, is very unconventional when he visits the city. The young woman revolts and leaves her country home. She meets the Alaska Kid, who introduces her to Lottie Bird, a fast living woman and a close acquaintance of Mr. Kane. Lottie plans a festive gathering, but when father and daughter meet unexpectedly in Lottie and the Kid's presence, he first raises a ruction about Dorothy for breaking into this lively society. Dorothy then counters sharply and strongly denounces her father for his cheating ways. She has fallen in love with the Alaska Kid and matters are patched up with her father's reformation.

== Cast ==
- Bryant Washburn as Alaska Kid
- Mabel Forrest as Dorothy Kane
- Kathleen Kirkham as Lottie Bird
- Wheeler Oakman as 'Winnie'
- Sidney De Gray as Mr. Kane
- Martha Franklin as Mrs. Kane
- Roscoe Karns as Hubert
- William H. Turner as President of the Board
- Ben Wilson Jr. as Page

== Bibliography ==
- Connelly, Robert B. The Silents: Silent Feature Films, 1910-36, Volume 40, Issue 2. December Press, 1998.
- Munden, Kenneth White. The American Film Institute Catalog of Motion Pictures Produced in the United States, Part 1. University of California Press, 1997.
