= Beau Revel =

1921 film

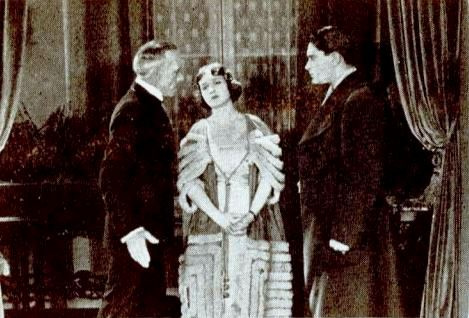
- Still with Lewis Stone, Florence Vidor, and Lloyd Hughes
- Directed by: John Griffith Wray
- Screenplay by: Luther Reed; Louis Joseph Vance
- Produced by: Thomas H. Ince
- Starring: Lewis Stone; Florence Vidor; Lloyd Hughes; Kathleen Kirkham; Dick Ryan; Harland Tucker
- Cinematography: Henry Sharp
- Production company: Thomas H. Ince Corporation
- Distributed by: Paramount Pictures
- Release date: March 20, 1921
- Running time: 69 minutes
- Country: United States
- Language: Silent (English intertitles)

Beau Revel is a 1921 American silent drama film directed by John Griffith Wray and written by Luther Reed and Louis Joseph Vance. The film stars Lewis Stone, Florence Vidor, Lloyd Hughes, Kathleen Kirkham, Dick Ryan, and Harland Tucker. The film was released on March 20, 1921, by Paramount Pictures.

== Cast ==
- Lewis Stone as Lawrence 'Beau' Revel
- Florence Vidor as Betty Lee
- Lloyd Hughes as Dick Revel
- Kathleen Kirkham as Alice Lathom
- Dick Ryan as Rossiter Wade
- Harland Tucker as Will Phyfe
- William Conklin as Fred Lathom
- Lydia Yeamans Titus as 'chronic' aunt
- William Musgrave as Bert Lee, the profligate brother
- Joe Campbell as Butler

== Preservation status ==
This film survives in the UCLA Film & Television Archive and the Library of Congress and in a European archive.
