= USS Breckinridge =

Wickes-class destroyer

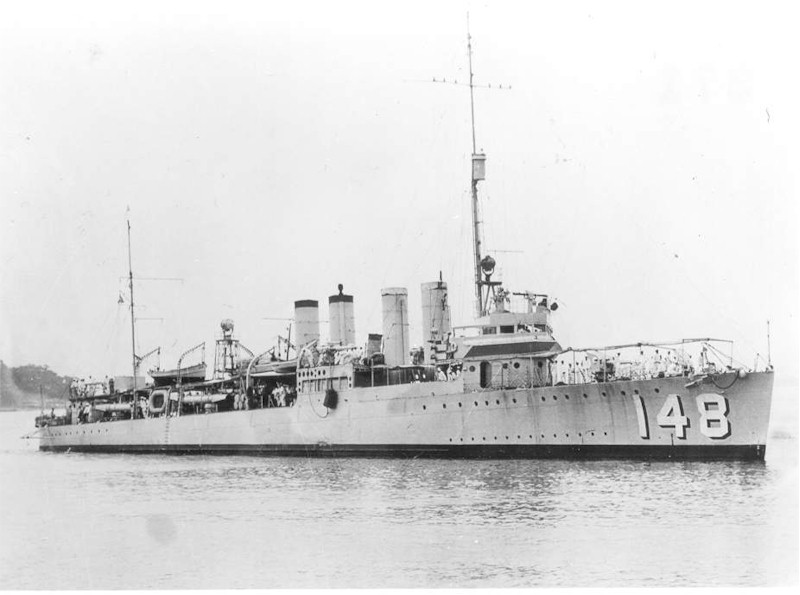
- USS Breckinridge

History

United States
- Name: Breckinridge
- Namesake: Joseph Cabell Breckinridge, Jr.
- Builder: William Cramp & Sons, Philadelphia
- Cost: $1,447,415.47 (hull & machinery)
- Yard number: 463
- Laid down: 11 March 1918
- Launched: 17 August 1918
- Commissioned: 27 February 1919
- Decommissioned: 30 June 1922
- Identification: DD-148
- Recommissioned: May 1930
- Decommissioned: September 1936
- Recommissioned: September 1939
- Decommissioned: 30 November 1945
- Reclassified: AG-112, 30 June 1945
- Stricken: 19 December 1945
- Fate: Sold for scrapping, 31 October 1946

General characteristics
- Class & type: Wickes-class destroyer
- Displacement: 1,154 tons
- Length: 314 ft 5 in (95.8 m)
- Beam: 31 ft 8 in (9.7 m)
- Draft: 9 ft 0 in (2.7 m)
- Speed: 35 knots (65 km/h)
- Complement: 122 officers and enlisted
- Armament: 4 × 4 in (102 mm) guns; 2 × 3 in (76 mm) guns; 12 × 21 in (533 mm) torpedo tubes

USS Breckinridge (DD–148) was a Wickes-class destroyer in the United States Navy during World War II, later reclassified as AG-112. She was named for Ensign Joseph Breckinridge.

== History ==
Breckinridge was launched on 17 August 1918 by William Cramp & Sons Ship and Engine Building Company, Philadelphia, sponsored by Miss Genevieve Dudley Breckinridge, a niece of Ensign Breckinridge. The ship was commissioned on 27 February 1919, Commander Arthur L. Bristol in command.

Breckinridge joined the Destroyer Force, Atlantic Fleet operating off Guantanamo Bay, Cuba. She was employed along the east coast principally in the development and tests of sonar devices until placed out of commission in reserve at Philadelphia on 30 June 1922. Recommissioned in May 1930, Breckinridge served with the Scouting Force United States Fleet, along the east coast until late in 1932. She sailed for the Pacific where she served with the Scouting Force from Alaska to Pearl Harbor. In May 1936 she was assigned to Training Squadron 10 and operated along the east coast and in Cuban waters until September 1936 when she was placed out of commission in reserve. After three years out of commission at Philadelphia, she was recommissioned in September 1939 and served with Division 66, Atlantic Squadron, on the Neutrality Patrol. In December 1940 she was assigned to the Inshore Patrol Station, Panama Canal Zone. Subsequent to May 1941 Breckinridge was based at Key West, Florida, patrolling and conducting underwater experiments and scheduled exercises.

Breckinridge operated under Commander, Caribbean Sea Frontier, on patrol and escort duties until December 1943 when she was assigned to the Atlantic Fleet. She joined TG 21.13, a hunter-killer group on 14 January 1944 for mid-Atlantic anti submarine sweeps. Returning to Norfolk 27 February after an uneventful operation, TG 21.13 was dissolved and Breckinridge proceeded to Boston for overhaul. On 22 March 1944 she returned to Norfolk and reported to TF 6 to escort a convoy across the Atlantic. Departing on 24 March 1944, the convoy reached the Mediterranean Sea with no interference. However, on the night of 11/12 April numerous German aircraft attacked the convoy inflicting damage to Holder.

Breckinridge returned to Boston on 11 May 1944. On 27 May she reported for duty to Commander, Caribbean Sea Frontier, and operated in the vicinity of Guantanamo Bay, Cuba, until 7 February 1945 when she returned to duty with the Atlantic Fleet. After undergoing overhaul at Boston Navy Yard between 10 February and 31 March she commenced operations at New London, Connecticut, as flagship of Destroyer Division 54.

== Fate ==
On 30 June 1945 Breckinridge was reclassified a miscellaneous auxiliary AG-112. After a short conversion period at the New York Navy Yard Annex, Bayonne, New Jersey. She sailed for the Pacific, reaching San Diego on 21 August. On 24 August she reported to Commander, Carrier Division 12, for duty as plane guard and escort vessel. Breckinridge operated in that capacity until decommissioned on 30 November 1945. She was sold for scrap on 31 October 1946.

== Awards ==
Breckinridge received one battle star for her World War II service.

== See also ==
- Bride 13 (1920)
