= Her Five-Foot Highness =

1920 film

- Directed by: Harry L. Franklin
- Screenplay by: Hal Hoadley
- Story by: Tarkington Baker
- Starring: Edith Roberts; Virginia Ware; Ogden Crane; Harold Miller; Stanhope Wheatcroft; Kathleen Kirkham
- Cinematography: Roy H. Klaffki
- Production company: Universal Film Manufacturing Company
- Distributed by: Universal Film Manufacturing Company
- Release date: April 1920
- Running time: 50 minutes
- Country: United States
- Language: English

Her Five-Foot Highness is a 1920 American silent western drama film directed by Harry L. Franklin and written by Hal Hoadley from a story by Tarkington Baker. The film stars Edith Roberts, Virginia Ware, Ogden Crane, Harold Miller, Stanhope Wheatcroft and Kathleen Kirkham. The film was released in April 1920, by Universal Film Manufacturing Company.

== Cast ==
- Edith Roberts as Ellen
- Virginia Ware as Lady Harriet
- Ogden Crane as Lesley Saunders
- Harold Miller as Sir Gerald Knowlton
- Stanhope Wheatcroft as Lord Pomeroy
- Kathleen Kirkham as Lady Clara
- Rudolph Christians as Solicitor
- Hugh Saxon as English Butler
- Leota Lorraine as Chorus Girl
- Tom London as Slim Higgins
- Henry Woodward as Williams

== Preservation ==
Her Five-Foot Highness is currently presumed lost. In February of 2021, the film was cited by the National Film Preservation Board on their Lost U.S. Silent Feature Films list.
