= Good-By Girls! =

1923 film directed by Jerome Storm

- Directed by: Jerome Storm
- Written by: Joseph F. Poland
- Produced by: William Fox
- Starring: William Russell; Carmel Myers; Tom Wilson
- Cinematography: Joseph H. August
- Production company: Fox Film Corporation
- Distributed by: Fox Film Corporation
- Release date: March 11, 1923
- Running time: 50 minutes
- Country: United States
- Languages: Silent; English intertitles

Good-By Girls! or Goodbye Girls is a 1923 American silent comedy mystery film directed by Jerome Storm and starring William Russell, Carmel Myers and Tom Wilson.

== Plot ==
While staying at a country house, author Vance McPhee gets drawn in a series of adventures concerning a strongbox.

== Cast ==
- William Russell as Vance McPhee
- Carmel Myers as Florence Brown
- Tom Wilson as Jordan
- Kate Price as Sarah
- Robert Klein as Batista

== Bibliography ==
- Solomon, Aubrey. The Fox Film Corporation, 1915-1935: A History and Filmography. McFarland, 2011.
