= Richard Stanton =

American actor

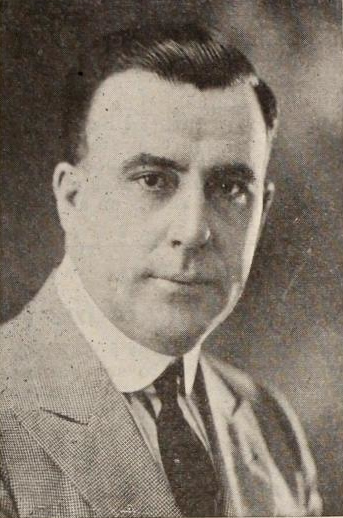
- Stanton in 1919
- Born: October 8, 1876; Iowa, United States
- Died: May 22, 1956 (aged 79); Los Angeles, California, United States
- Occupations: Actor, film director
- Years active: 1911–1925

Richard Stanton (October 8, 1876 – May 22, 1956) was an American actor and director of the silent era. He appeared in 68 films between 1911 and 1916. He also directed 57 films between 1914 and 1925. He was born in Iowa and died in Los Angeles, California.

Stanton was described as a "handsome, musical fellow", but was also a capable pugilist, demonstrating his boxing skills to two other fighters he worked with in a film.

== Selected filmography ==
- In the Secret Service (1913)
- The Wasp (1915)
- Graft (1915)
- The Yankee Way (1917)
- One Touch of Sin (1917)
- The Spy (1917)
- Cheating the Public (1918)
- Rough and Ready (1918)
- The Caillaux Case (1918)
- Bride 13 (1920)
- The Face at Your Window (1920)
- McGuire of the Mounted (1923)
- American Pluck (1925)
