= Bride 13 =

1920 film

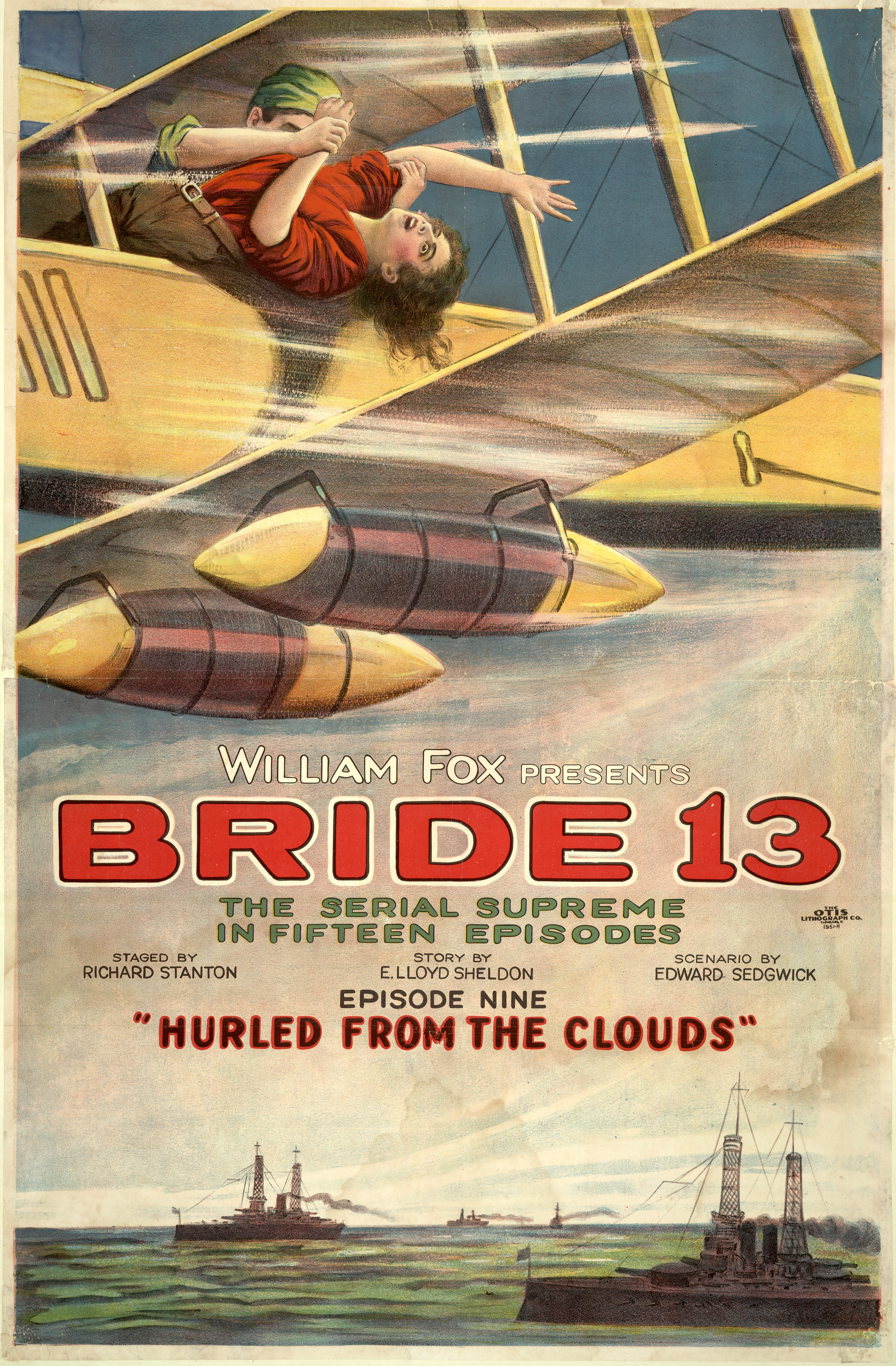
- Film poster
- Directed by: Richard Stanton
- Written by: Edward Sedgwick; E. Lloyd Sheldon
- Produced by: William Fox
- Starring: Marguerite Clayton; John B. O'Brien
- Distributed by: Fox Film Corporation
- Release date: September 10, 1920
- Running time: 15 episodes
- Country: United States
- Language: Silent (English intertitles)
- Budget: $1.25 million

Bride 13 is a 1920 American silent adventure thriller film serial directed by Richard Stanton, and the first film serial made by Fox. It is considered to be a lost film. Bride 13 was promoted as romantic film.

== Plot ==
A band of pirates operating from a submarine off the U.S. coast cause depredations, and thirteen young and beautiful brides from wealthy families disappear and are held for ransom for millions of dollars, requiring the assistance of the Department of Justice and the U.S. Navy.

== Cast ==
- Marguerite Clayton as Bride 13
- John B. O'Brien as Lt. Bob Norton
- Gretchen Hartman as Zara
- Arthur Earle
- Lyster Chambers as Stephen Winthrop
- Mary Christensen
- Justine Holland as Bride 2
- Dorothy Langley as Bride 1
- Mary Ellen Capers as Bride 8
- Martha McKay as Bride 5
- Helen Johnson as Bride 6
- Leona Clayton as Bride 4
- Florence Mills as Bride 9
- W. E. Lawrence (as William Lawrence)

== Production ==
Aiming to give the American public a sense of the importance of its warships and their operations, the U.S. Navy assisted in the production of the film by making its ships available. In addition to film of warships underway, scenes were filmed on board the destroyer USS Breckinridge (DD-148) and submarine USS R-1, and on seaplanes from the squadron assigned to the USS Shawmut (CM-4).

== Promotion ==
From an ad for the film:

Do you want to be thrilled as you never have been thrilled since as a boy or girl you first read Jules Verne, Dumas, Poe or Conan Doyle?
If you do, don't miss the first or any succeeding episodes of BRIDE 13. Beginning with the abduction for ransom of wealthy brides by a cutthroat band of submarine pirates from Tripoli, carrying you from palatial homes to the sun-scorched sands of Northern Africa. Bride 13 piles crisis upon crisis, climax upon climax, thrill upon thrill.
Each episode leaves you feeling that you could not endure the excitement of another reel, yet in tremendous suspense to know what happens next.
So stupendous is the situation created by the plot of Bride 13 that it could only be solved by the most powerful actor in the world!
OUR NAVY, with its dreadnoughts, destroyers, submarines, seaplanes, blimps, officers and men, is one of the most important actors in Bride 13, through the special courtesy of the Government.
The fierce combats on sea and land, the pursuits by sea, air and land, and hundreds of other incidents are made absolutely realistic because enacted by genuine naval officers, sailors and marines."

== Chapter titles ==
1. Snatched from the Altar
2. The Pirate's Fangs
3. The Craft of Despair#The Vulture's Prey
4. The Torture Chamber
5. The Tarantula's Trail
6. Tongues of Flame
7. Entombed
8. Hurled from the Clouds
9. The Cavern of Terror
10. Greyhounds of the Sea
11. The Creeping Peril
12. Reefs of Treachery
13. The Fiendish Tribesmen
14. Thundering Vengeance

== See also ==
- List of film serials
- List of film serials by studio
- List of lost films
