= Ham and Eggs at the Front =

1927 film by Roy Del Ruth

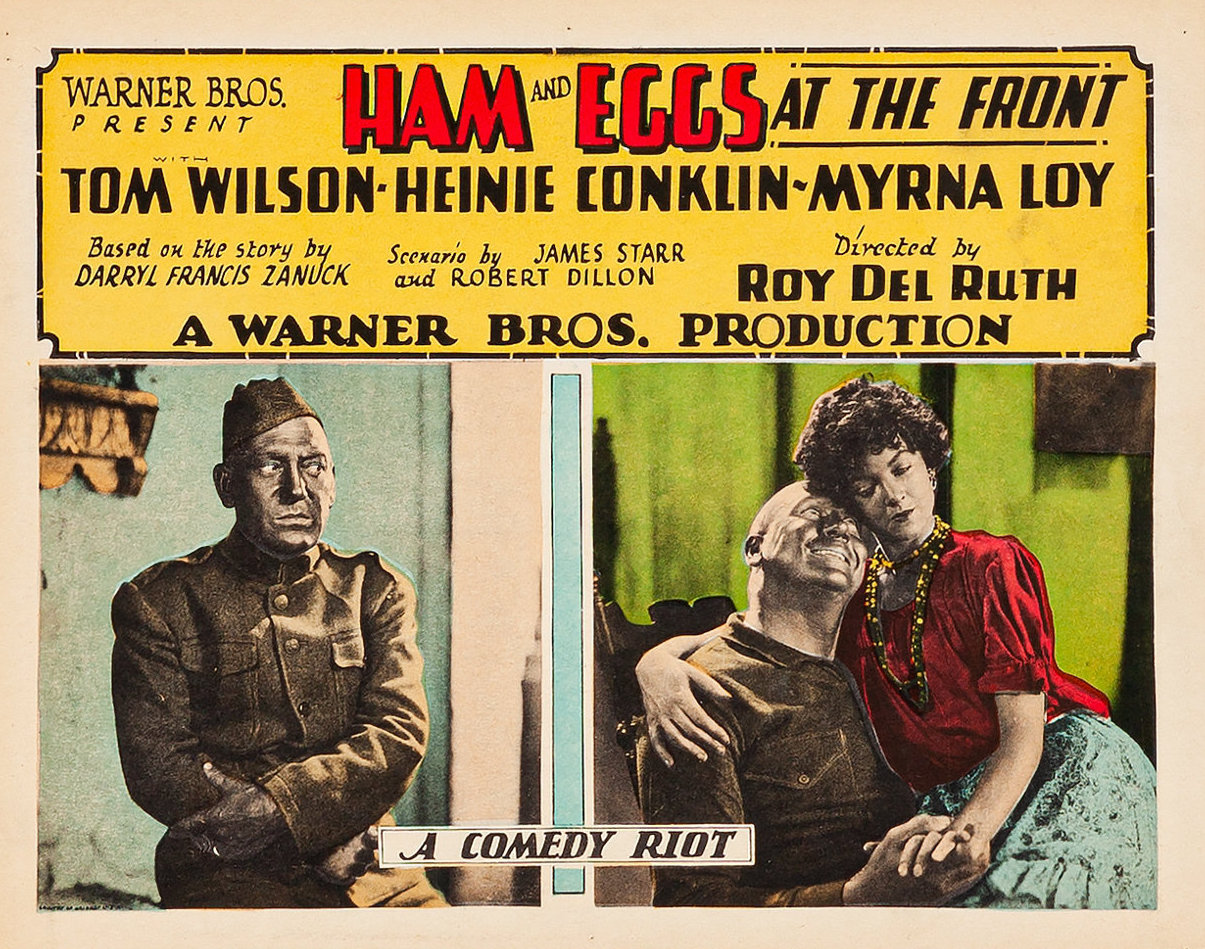
- Lobby card
- Directed by: Roy Del Ruth
- Written by: Robert Dillon; James A. Star
- Story by: Darryl F. Zanuck
- Produced by: Darryl F. Zanuck
- Starring: Tom Wilson; Heinie Conklin; Myrna Loy
- Cinematography: Charles G. Clarke
- Production company: Warner Bros.
- Distributed by: Warner Bros.
- Release date: December 24, 1927
- Running time: 60 minutes
- Country: United States
- Languages: Sound (Synchronized) (English intertitles)

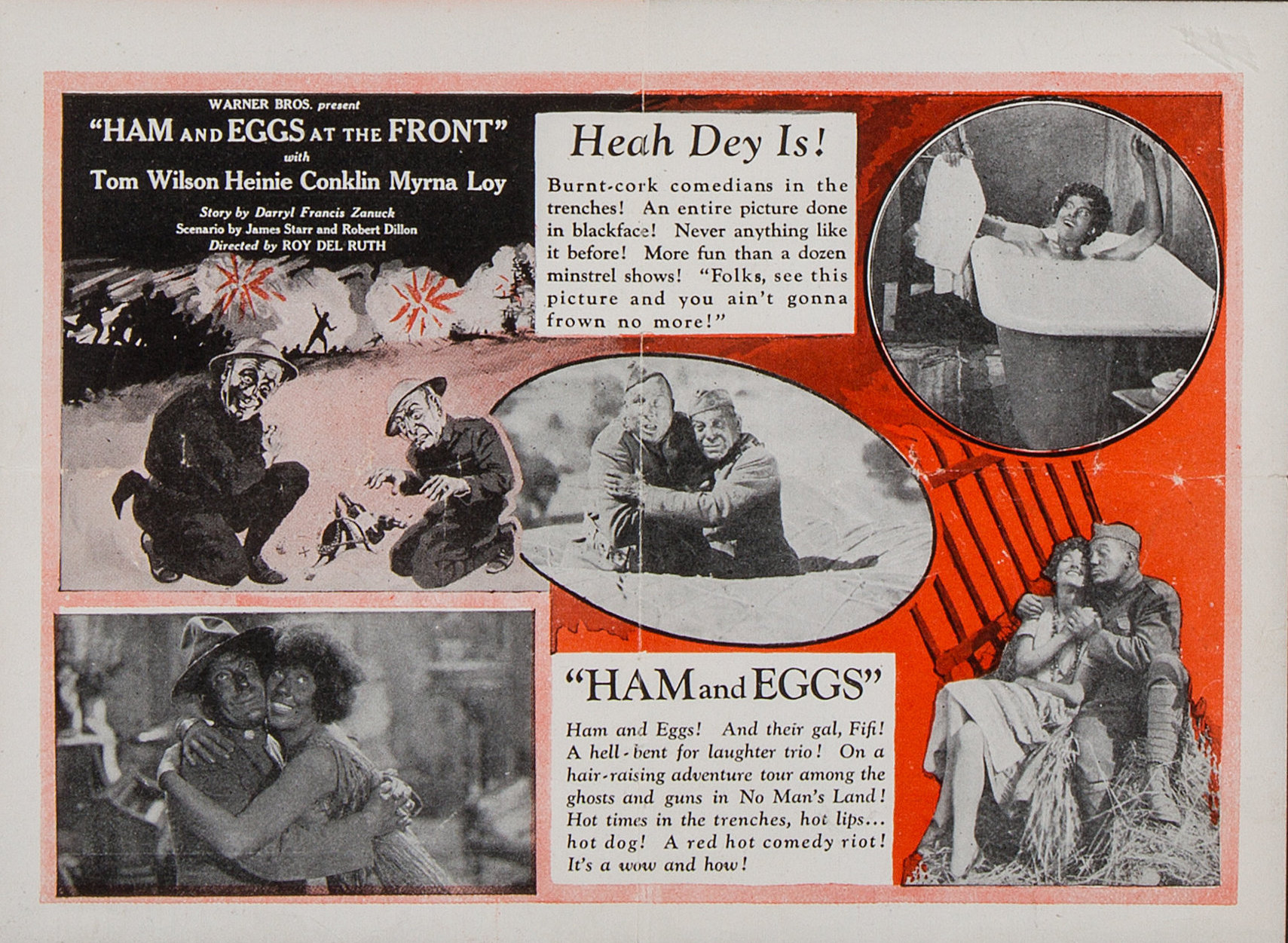
Inside a pamphlet discussing the film.

Ham and Eggs at the Front is a 1927 American synchronized sound comedy film directed by Roy Del Ruth and starring Tom Wilson, Heinie Conklin and Myrna Loy—all in blackface. While the film has no audible dialog, it was released with a synchronized musical score with sound effects using the Vitaphone sound-on-disc process. Long thought to be a lost film, a print was screened at the Pordenone Silent Film Festival in 2021 courtesy of the Cineteca Italiana.

== Plot ==
Ham and Eggs, two spirited privates in an "all-colored" U.S. Army regiment, become friends during training at a Georgia army camp. Sharing everything from lucky rabbit's feet to mess kit "corn willie" and bets on African golf, the duo bumble their way through army life.

Shipped overseas during World War I, Ham and Eggs are stationed in a small French village—unaware that the seemingly sleepy town is a nest of espionage. The local inn is operated by von Friml, a German spy posing as an innkeeper. Hoping to extract information about the size of the "colored" regiment, von Friml enlists the help of his alluring assistant Fifi, a flirtatious and mysterious waitress.

Fifi quickly catches the attention of both Ham and Eggs. When she invites Eggs to visit her that night, he arrives to find Ham already cozily installed and trying his own luck. The two settle into a comic standoff to see who can outlast the other. Their romantic rivalry is cut short by the arrival of a military policeman. Sent by the U.S. secret service to investigate the inn's suspicious activity, the MP arrests none of them—but grows suspicious of Fifi and places her under guard.

Ham and Eggs are reluctantly assigned to watch Fifi until their superior arrives. They're given strict orders: if Fifi does not reveal von Friml's whereabouts within five minutes, they are to shoot her. Fearing her feminine wiles more than the consequences of disobedience, the men beg off—but orders are orders.

Inside, Fifi does her best to beguile the guards into letting her escape. Although tempted, Ham and Eggs resist—until Fifi disappears through a trapdoor. In the process of searching for her, they accidentally uncover a coded message detailing enemy plans. Their discovery earns them a swift promotion to secret service duty.

Their first mission as operatives is to locate a clandestine wireless station operating from a castle set within a graveyard. The assignment quickly turns into a fright-night farce. Von Friml, alerted to their approach, stages a spooky spectacle using a skeleton, successfully scaring the nervous soldiers away. They report back in failure and are reassigned to their old unit.

Soon after, their regiment is sent to the front lines. Amid the chaos of trench warfare, Ham is wounded during a charge and Eggs heroically carries him to safety. During recovery behind the lines, the two go for a quiet walk—unknowingly lying down on a deflated observation balloon.

Without warning, the balloon inflates and lifts the hapless pair into the sky. Tether lines snap, and soon they are drifting above the battlefield. In a panic, Ham and Eggs fumble with parachutes as the balloon begins to leak. Their comic descent becomes heroic when Ham lands in a tree overlooking von Friml's hidden wireless station. He knocks out the spy just as pursuing soldiers arrive, securing yet another accidental victory.

The Armistice is signed. Ham and Eggs return home as decorated veterans, proud of their service. But when they go to visit their old sweetheart, they find she has married a flashy “big shine man” during their absence. Eggs sighs, “Well, you still got your Eggs.” To which Ham replies, “But you-all ain’t got no sax appeal!”

== Cast ==
- Tom Wilson as Ham
- Heinie Conklin as Eggs
- Myrna Loy as Fifi
- William Irving as von Friml
- Noah Young as Sergeant
- Louise Fazenda as Cally Brown
- Tom Kennedy as Lazarus

== See also ==
- List of early sound feature films (1926–1929)
