= Cheating the Public =

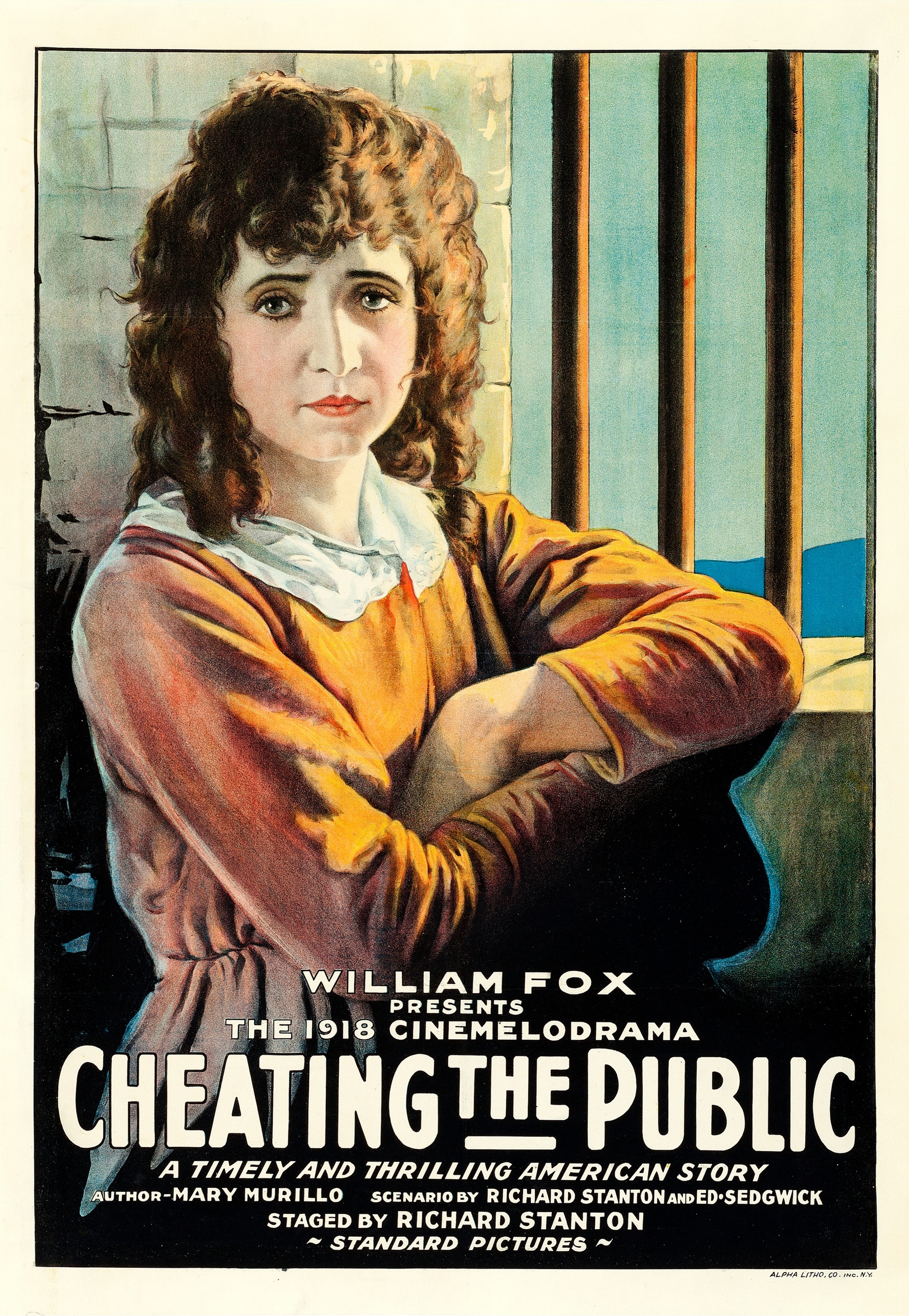
- Directed by: Richard Stanton
- Written by: Mary Murillo (story); Richard Stanton; Edward Sedgwick
- Produced by: William Fox
- Starring: Enid Markey; Ralph Lewis; Bertram Grassby
- Cinematography: Devereaux Jennings
- Production company: Fox Film Corporation
- Distributed by: Fox Film Corporation
- Release date: January 20, 1918
- Running time: 70 minutes
- Country: United States
- Languages: Silent; English intertitles

Cheating the Public is a 1918 American silent drama film directed by Richard Stanton and starring Enid Markey, Ralph Lewis and Bertram Grassby.

== Cast ==
- Enid Markey as Mary Garvin
- Ralph Lewis as John Dowling
- Bertram Grassby as Chester Dowling
- Tom Wilson as 'Bull' Thompson
- Edward Peil Sr. as Mary's Attorney
- Charles Edler as Martin
- Wanda Hawley as Grace Martin
- Carrie Clark Ward as Mrs. O'Toole
- Fanny Midgley as Mary's Mother
- Frankie Lee as Frankie Garvin
- Barbara Conley as Bobby
- James Titus as The Judge
- Henry Peal as The District Attorney
- Joseph Hartley as The Twelfth Juror
- James Morgan as Warden
- Arthur Glynn as The Governor
- James P. McNeill as Dowling's Butler
- Arthur Shilling as Dowling's Secretary
- Fritz von Hardenberg as Factory Inspector

== Preservation ==
The film is now lost.

== Bibliography ==
- Solomon, Aubrey. The Fox Film Corporation, 1915-1935: A History and Filmography. McFarland, 2011.
