= Peter Briggs (screenwriter) =

English cinematographer and screenwriter (born 1965)

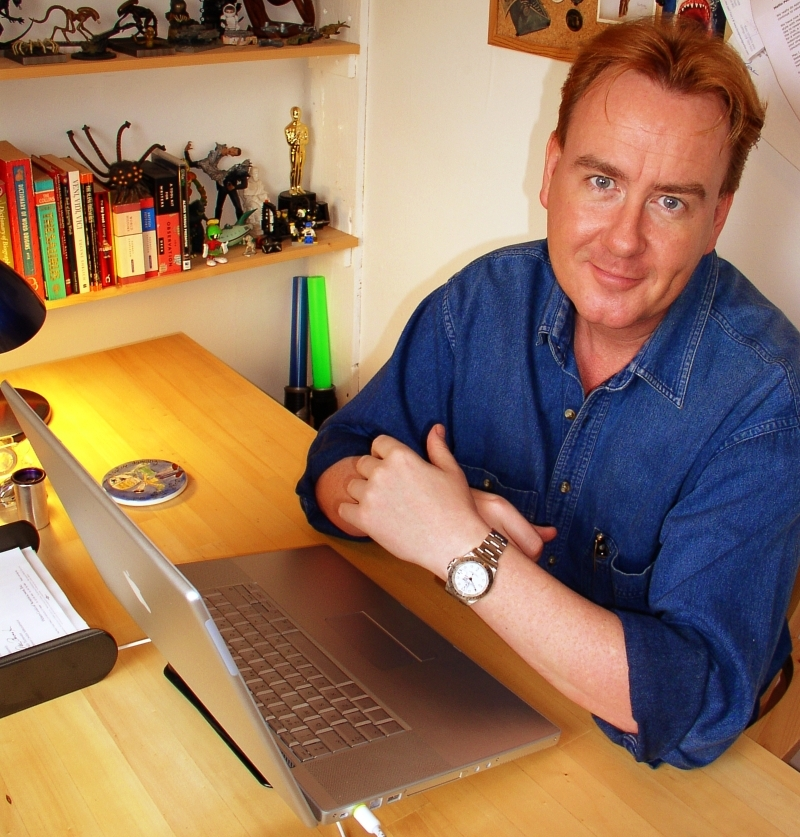
- Peter Briggs in London in 2004.
- Born: 12 December 1965 (age 60); Whiston, Merseyside, England
- Occupation: Cinematographer • screenwriter
- Years active: 1991–present
- Known for: Hellboy
- Relatives: Andy Briggs (brother)

Peter Briggs (born 12 December 1965) is an English cinematographer and screenwriter. Although he has worked in the motion picture industry for more than 30 years, he is best known for the film Hellboy. His films draw heavily on sources as diverse as weird fiction, fantasy, and war.

== Film career ==
A former cinematographer, the British-born screenwriter developed fantasy-genre material for Paramount Pictures in the UK in the early part of his career. Briggs wrote a screenplay for Alien vs. Predator in 1991, which sold to 20th Century Fox. The project languished in development hell for many years until a version was brought to the screen in 2004. Briggs' draft was cited as an example of strong action writing in Chris Gore's book The 50 Greatest Movies Never Made. Briggs scripted the 2004 film Hellboy, sharing story credit with director Guillermo del Toro. He has contributed material to motion picture projects for companies as diverse as Touchstone Pictures, New Line Cinema, and Miramax.

== Television career ==
Briggs contributed an episode, "Heist Society", to the first season of the 2015 rebooted ITV Studios show Thunderbirds Are Go, produced by Weta Workshop and Pukeko Pictures. Briggs explained the collaboration came from the two-month period he spent in New Zealand working on the still in-development movie Panzer 88 with Weta Workshop and was due to his lifetime love of Gerry Anderson shows.
