= Tarzan: The Greystoke Legacy =

2011 novel by Andy Briggs

- Author: Andy Briggs
- Language: English
- Series: Tarzan series
- Genre: Adventure novel
- Publisher: Faber and Faber; Open Road Media
- Publication date: 2011 (United Kingdom); 2012 (United States)
- Publication place: United Kingdom; United States
- Media type: Print (trade paper); Kindle (Amazon.uk, Amazon.com)
- Pages: 283
- ISBN: 978-0-571-27238-9 (UK); 978-1-4532-7107-0 (US)
- Preceded by: The Adventures of Tarzan (2006)
- Followed by: Tarzan: The Jungle Warrior (2012)

Tarzan: The Greystoke Legacy is a 2011 young adult novel by Andy Briggs that reboots the Tarzan book series to the present day. The novel was published in the United Kingdom by Faber and Faber, and in the United States by Open Road Media. It has also been distributed in Canada.

== Background ==
The novel is set in the present day Democratic Republic of the Congo. Tarzan is around the age of 18, and can speak some English due to time he spent with the now-deceased D'Arnot (a French UN Peacekeeper).Jane Porter is a teenage girl in the jungle with her father Archibald "Archie", who had to abandon his medical practice after his wife's gambling and debts to loan sharks broke up the family. Archie hopes that the profits from illegal logging will allow him to pay off the debt, enabling him to return to America with Jane.

The third main character is Robbie, a boy the same age as Jane, who ran away from America because he believes he is wanted for murdering the man who killed Robbie's sister.

== Sequels ==
- Tarzan: The Jungle Warrior (ISBN 978-0-571-27353-9 (UK), ISBN 978-1-4532-7108-7 (US), July 2012) 100th anniversary of Tarzan of the Apes.
- Tarzan: The Savage Lands (ISBN 978-0-571-29732-0 (UK), ISBN 978-1-4804-0014-6 (US), February 2013)

Preceded by The Adventures of Tarzan	Tarzan series The Greystoke Legacy	Succeeded by Tarzan: The Jungle Warrior (2012)
