= Enid Markey =

American actress (1894–1981)

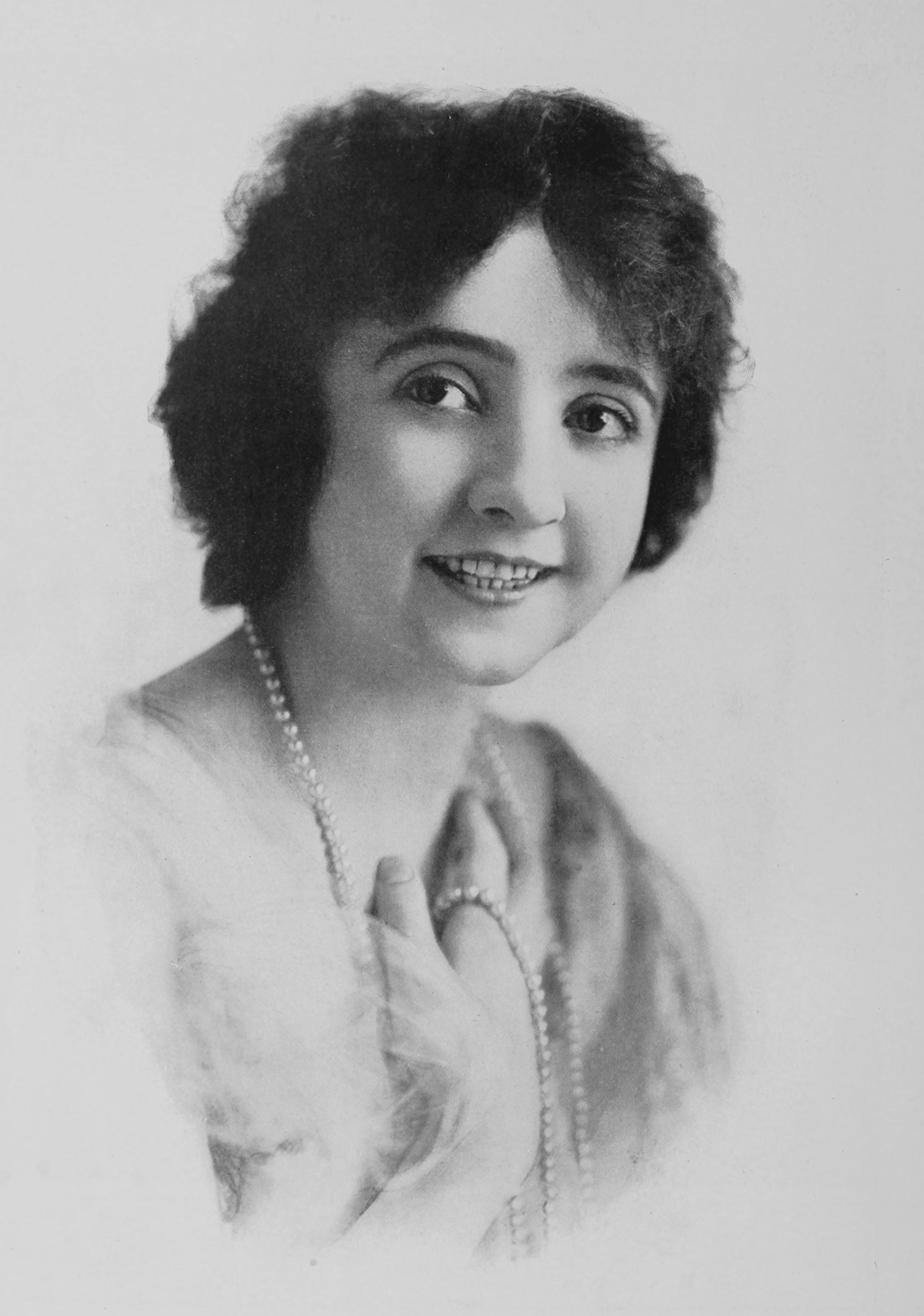
- Markey in 1916
- Born: February 22, 1894; Dillon, Colorado
- Died: November 15, 1981 (aged 87); Bay Shore, New York, U.S.
- Occupation: Actress
- Years active: 1911–1968

Enid Markey (February 22, 1894 – November 15, 1981) was an American theatre, film, radio, and television actress, whose career spanned over 50 years, extending from the early 1900s to the late 1960s. In movies, she was the first performer to portray the fictional character Jane, Tarzan's "jungle" companion and later his wife. Markey performed as Jane twice in 1918, costarring with Elmo Lincoln in the films Tarzan of The Apes and The Romance of Tarzan.

== Early years ==
Markey was born in Dillon, Colorado. Her education came in boarding school in Denver.

== Career ==
Markey acted on stage and in vaudeville before turning to movies. Her first film role was in The Fortunes of War (1911). During the production of The Wrath of the Gods (1914), Markey, a "leading lady with the New York Motion Picture Company", was "badly injured" during the production. During her scene in which the lava flow destroys the village, she was surrounded by smoke and fumes, and was nearly asphyxiated, but had recovered by May 1914.

After Markey made the first two Tarzan films, she turned to acting on stage, saying "I really wanted to learn how to act." She acted in 29 Broadway plays, beginning with Up in Mabel's Room (1919) and ending with What Did We Do Wrong? (1967).

During the 1950s and 1960s, she appeared in several television series including Alfred Hitchcock Presents, The Adventures of Ozzie and Harriet and The Defenders.

In 1963, she guest-starred as Mrs. Mendelbright, Barney Fife's landlady on The Andy Griffith Show in the episode "Up in Barney's Room." Later, in 1966, she appeared as Grandma Pyle on Gomer Pyle, U.S.M.C. in the episode "Grandma Pyle: Fortune Teller." She also had two appearances in The Adventures of Ozzie and Harriet.

In the 1960-1961 season, Markey had a regular role as Aunt Violet Flower in the sitcom Bringing Up Buddy, co-starring Frank Aletter and Doro Merande. Markey and Merande played spinster aunts who provide a home for their bachelor nephew, stockbroker Buddy Flower, played by Aletter.

Her last appearance was in The Boston Strangler (1968).

== Personal life ==
Markey married American Can Company executive George W. Cobb in 1942. He died in 1948.

== Death ==
While visiting friends in Long Island, New York on November 13, 1981, Markey suffered a heart attack and was admitted to South Side Hospital in Bay Shore, New York, where she died two days later at age 87.

== Partial filmography ==
- The Battle of Gettysburg (1913)
- Shorty's Sacrifice (1914, short) - Ethel Somners
- The Wrath of the Gods (1914)
- The Cup of Life (1915) - Ruth Fiske
- The Darkening Trail (1915) - Ruby McGraw
- The Mating (1915) - Daisy Arnold
- The Iron Strain (1915) - Octavia Van Ness
- Between Men (1915) - Lina Hampdon
- Aloha Oe (1915) - Kalaniweo
- The Despoiler (1915) - Sylvia Damien
- Civilization (1915) - Katheryn Haldemann
- The Conqueror (1916) - Viva Madison
- The No-Good Guy (1916) - Lucia Andrada
- The Phantom (1916) - Avice Bereton
- The Captive God (1916) - Lolomi
- Shell 43 (1916) - Adrienne von Altman
- Lieutenant Danny, U.S.A. (1916) - Ysobel Ventura
- Jim Grimsby's Boy (1916) - Bill Grimsby
- The Devil's Double (1916) - Naomi Tarleton
- Blood Will Tell (1917) - Nora North
- The Yankee Way (1917) - Princess Alexia
- The Curse of Eve (1917) - Eva Stanley
- The Zeppelin's Last Raid (1917) - The girl
- Cheating the Public (1918) - Mary Garvin
- Tarzan of the Apes (1918) - Jane Porter
- Six Shooter Andy (1918) - Susan Allenby
- The Romance of Tarzan (1918) - Jane
- Mother, I Need You (1918)
- Sink or Swim (1920) - Princess Alexia
- Snafu (1945) - Aunt Emily
- The Naked City (1948) - Mrs. Hylton
- Take One False Step (1949) - Clara
- Alfred Hitchcock Presents (1956) (Season 1 Episode 35 "The Legacy") - Cecilia Smithson
- The Boston Strangler (1968) - Edna
