= The Romance of Tarzan =

1918 film by Wilfred Lucas

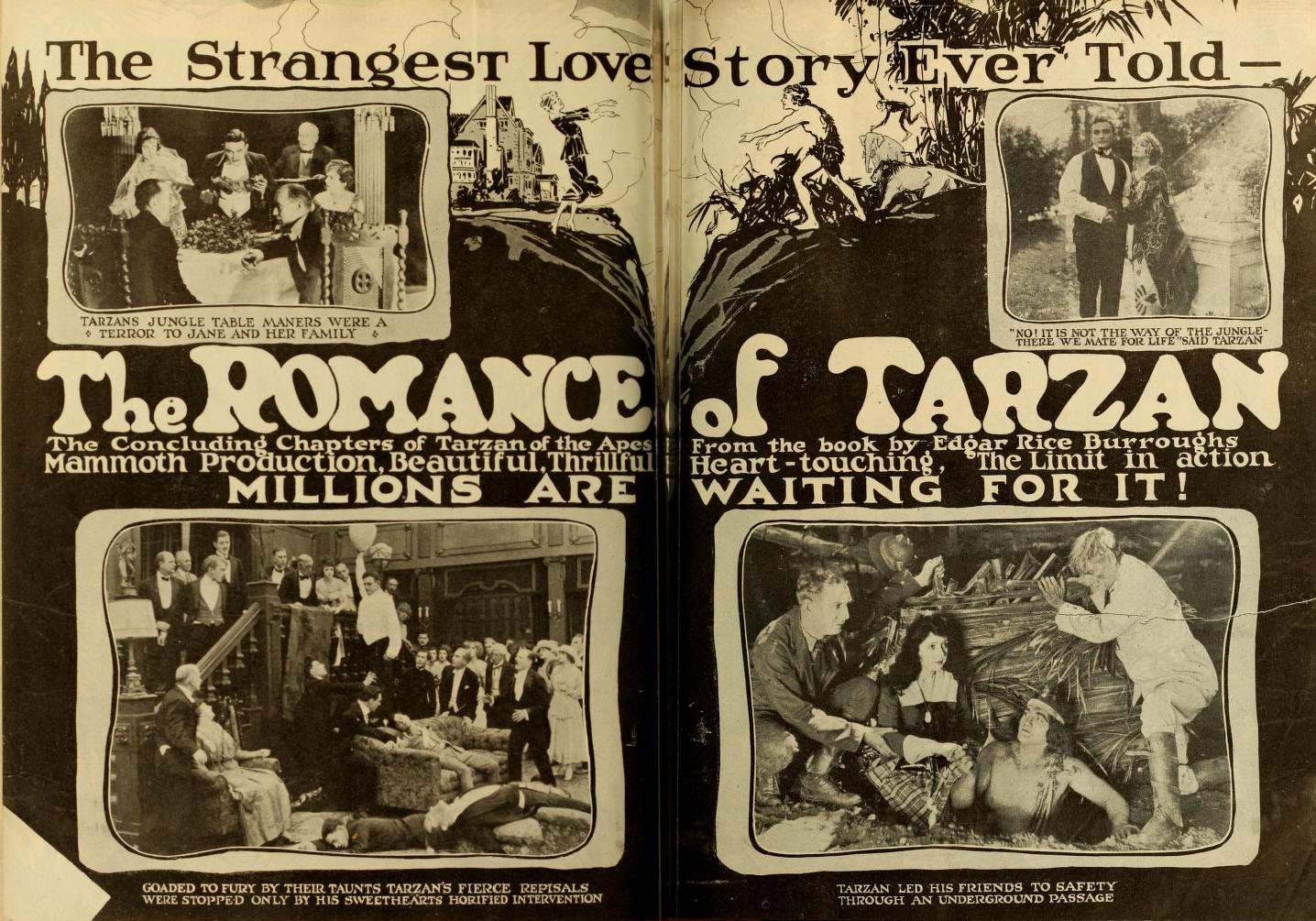
- Advertisement (1918)
- Directed by: Wilfred Lucas
- Written by: Bess Meredyth; Wilfred Lucas
- Based on: Tarzan of the Apes by Edgar Rice Burroughs
- Produced by: William Parsons; Isadore Bernstein ("Supervised")
- Starring: Elmo Lincoln; Enid Markey; Thomas Jefferson; Cleo Madison
- Cinematography: Harry Vallejo
- Edited by: C. R. Wallace
- Distributed by: National Film Corporation of America
- Release date: September 16, 1918
- Running time: 96 min
- Country: United States
- Language: Silent (English intertitles)

The Romance of Tarzan is a 1918 American silent action adventure film directed by Wilfred Lucas starring Elmo Lincoln, Enid Markey, Thomas Jefferson, and Cleo Madison. The movie was the second Tarzan movie ever made, and is based on Edgar Rice Burroughs' original 1912 novel Tarzan of the Apes. It adapts only the second part of the novel, the earlier portion having been the basis for the preceding film Tarzan of the Apes (1918). Less popular than its predecessor due to much of the action taking place in the wild west rather than Africa, the film has not been preserved, and no prints of it are known to survive today.

== Plot ==
The film opens with flashbacks from Tarzan of the Apes to establish the back story. The African expedition led by Professor Porter to find Tarzan, the ape-raised heir of Lord Greystoke, has been crowned with success, and Tarzan and Porter's daughter Jane are in love.

The party now prepares to return to civilization when it is attacked by natives and separated from the ape-man. Tarzan's paternal cousin William Cecil Clayton, the current Lord Greystoke, desiring to keep his wealth and title, reports having seen the savages kill Tarzan. Believing him dead, they leave without their charge. But Tarzan has in fact survived, and is eager to be reunited with Jane. Finding his new friends gone he swims out to another boat to follow.

Eventually he reaches the United States, and is landed near the Porters' ranch in San Francisco, California. Tarzan in civilization is like a bull in a china shop, as is demonstrated early in a destructive incident in a dance hall, where his prowess impresses La Belle Odine. Things get back on track when Jane is kidnapped by outlaws, presenting him with the opportunity to rescue her. Jane, however, is cold to him, as Clayton has falsely convinced her he is in love with the other woman. Heartbroken, Tarzan swears off civilization and returns to Africa. Belatedly learning the truth from Odine, Jane follows, and is happily reunited with her lover in the jungle.

== Cast ==
- Elmo Lincoln as Tarzan
- Enid Markey as Jane
- Thomas Jefferson as Professor Porter
- Cleo Madison as the Other Woman, La Belle Odine
- Clyde Benson as Lawyer
- Monte Blue as Juan
- True Boardman as Lord Greystoke
- John Cook as Undetermined Role
- Nigel De Brulier as Priest
- Phil Dunham as Englishman
- George B. French as Binns
- Gordon Griffith as Tarzan As A Boy
- Colin Kenny as Clayton
- Kathleen Kirkham as Lady Greystoke
- Bessie Toner as Undetermined Role

== Reception ==
Like many American films of the time, The Romance of Tarzan was subject to cuts by city and state film censorship boards. For example, the Chicago Board of Censors required a cut, in Reel 2, of Tarzan choking a native with his arm, Reel 4, Tarzan kissing a young woman on her breast, Reel 6, the intertitle "If you will only spare him I will go back and be your slave", a scene showing Tarzan lifting a man off his feet and choking him, and two scenes of Tarzan choking a man.

== See also ==
- List of lost films
