= The Wasp (1915 film) =

1915 film

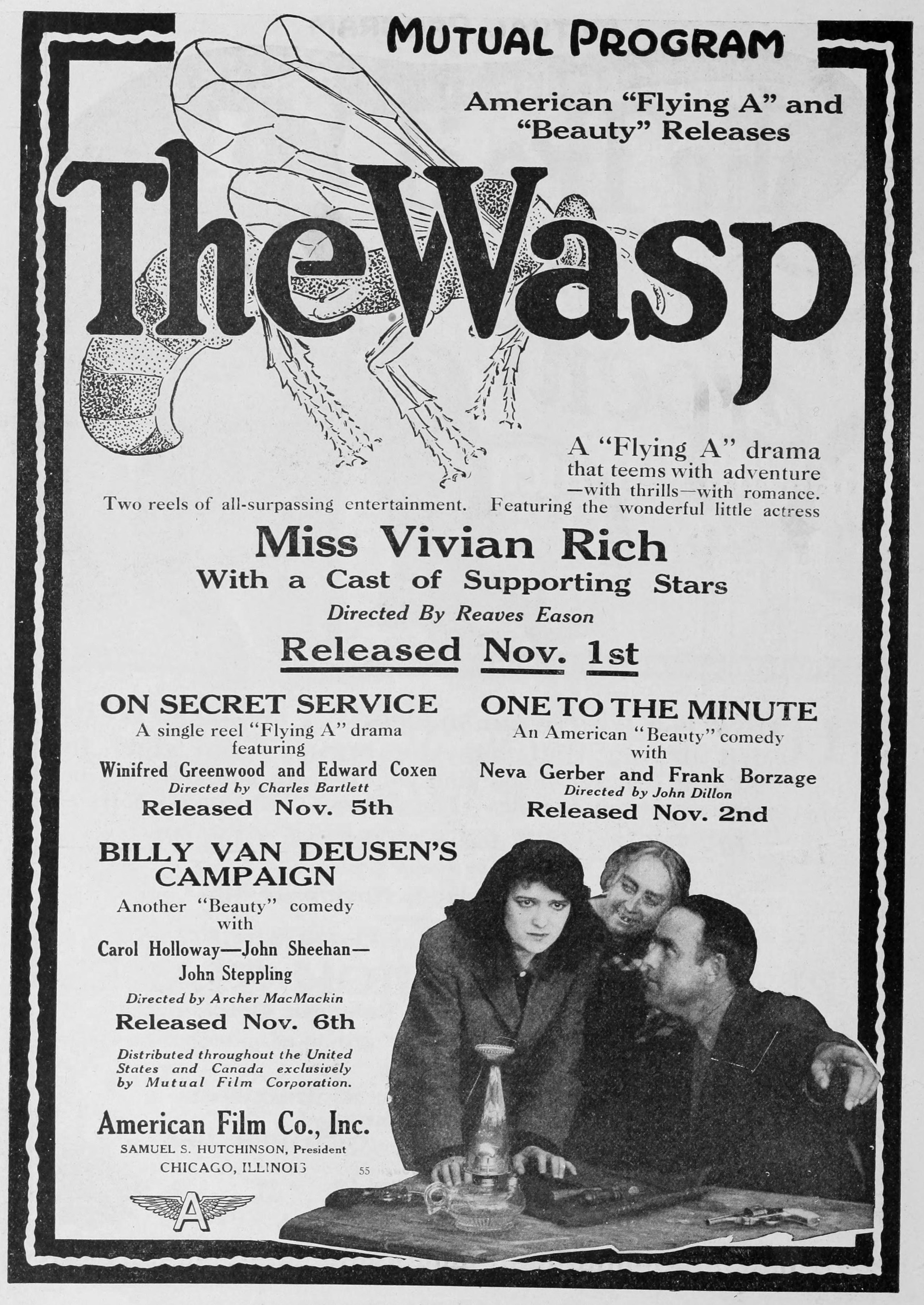
- Magazine advertisement
- Directed by: B. Reeves Eason
- Starring: Hugh Bennett
- Distributed by: Mutual Film Corporation
- Release date: November 1, 1915
- Running time: 2 reels
- Country: United States
- Languages: Silent; English intertitles

The Wasp is a 1915 American short film directed by B. Reeves Eason.

== Cast ==
- Hugh Bennett
- Vivian Rich
- Walter Spencer
- Richard Stanton
- Roy Stewart
