= The White Moth =

1924 film by Maurice Tourneur

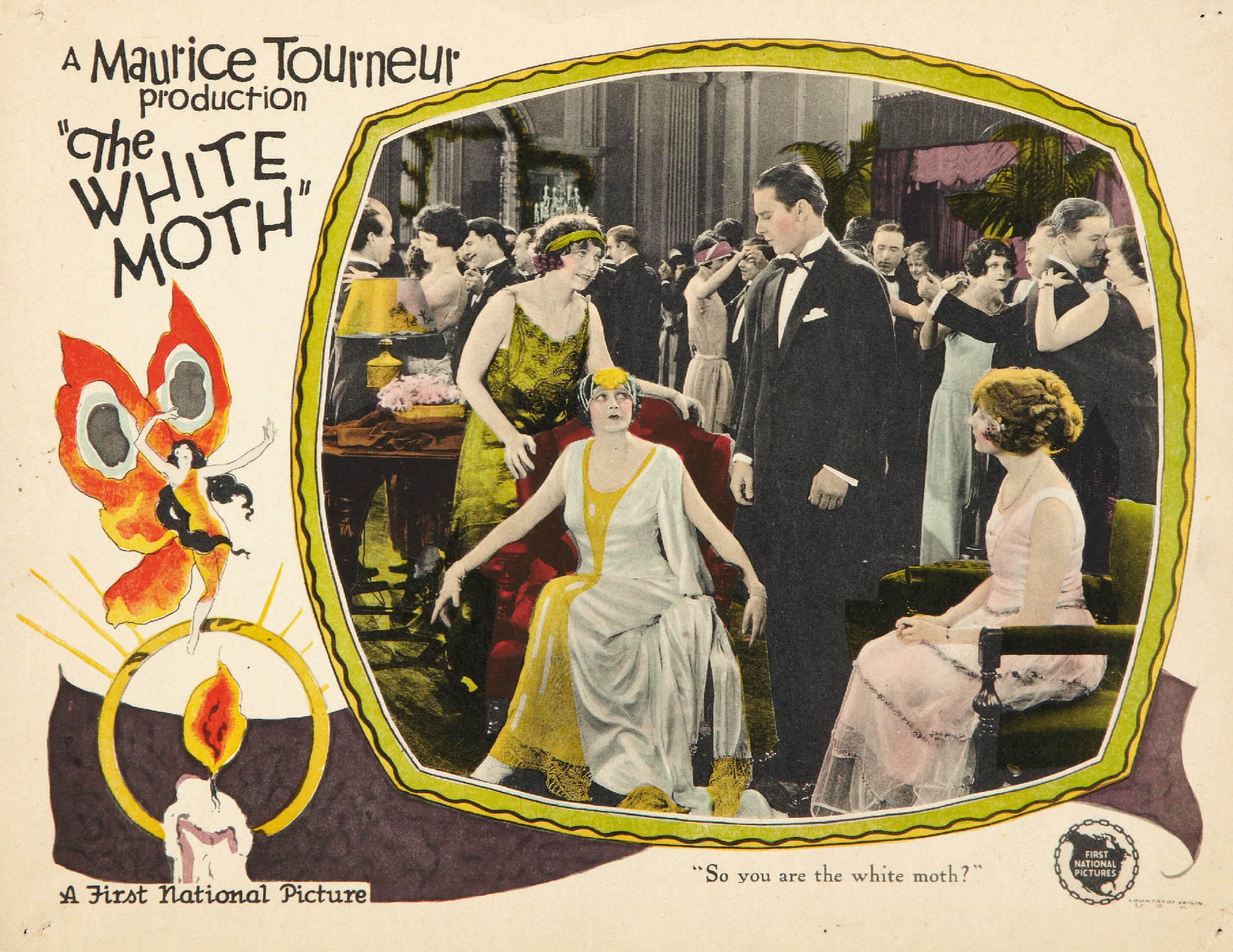
- Lobby card
- Directed by: Maurice Tourneur
- Written by: Barbara La Marr (uncredited); Albert S. Le Vino (adaptation)
- Story by: Izola Forrester
- Produced by: Maurice Tourneur; M. C. Levee
- Starring: Barbara La Marr
- Cinematography: Arthur L. Todd
- Edited by: Frank Lawrence
- Distributed by: First National Pictures
- Release date: May 11, 1924
- Running time: 7 reels
- Country: United States
- Language: Silent (English intertitles)

The White Moth (1924)

The White Moth is a 1924 American silent drama film produced and directed by Maurice Tourneur from a magazine story by Izola Forrester, and distributed by First National Pictures. Barbara La Marr was the female lead supported by a young Ben Lyon.

== Cast ==
- Barbara La Marr as Mona Reid / The White Moth
- Conway Tearle as Vantine Morley
- Charles de Rochefort as Gonzalo Montrez (credited as Charles de Roche)
- Ben Lyon as Douglas Morley
- Edna Murphy as Gwendolyn Dallas
- Josie Sedgwick as Ninon Aurel
- Kathleen Kirkham as Mrs. Delancey
- William Orlamond as Tothnes

== Reception ==
The White Moth had its world premiere on May 3, 1924, at the Lowe's State Theater in Los Angeles.

== Preservation ==
The White Moth survives at the Library of Congress, Museum of Modern Art, and Gosfilmofond in Moscow.
