= The Yankee Way =

1917 film

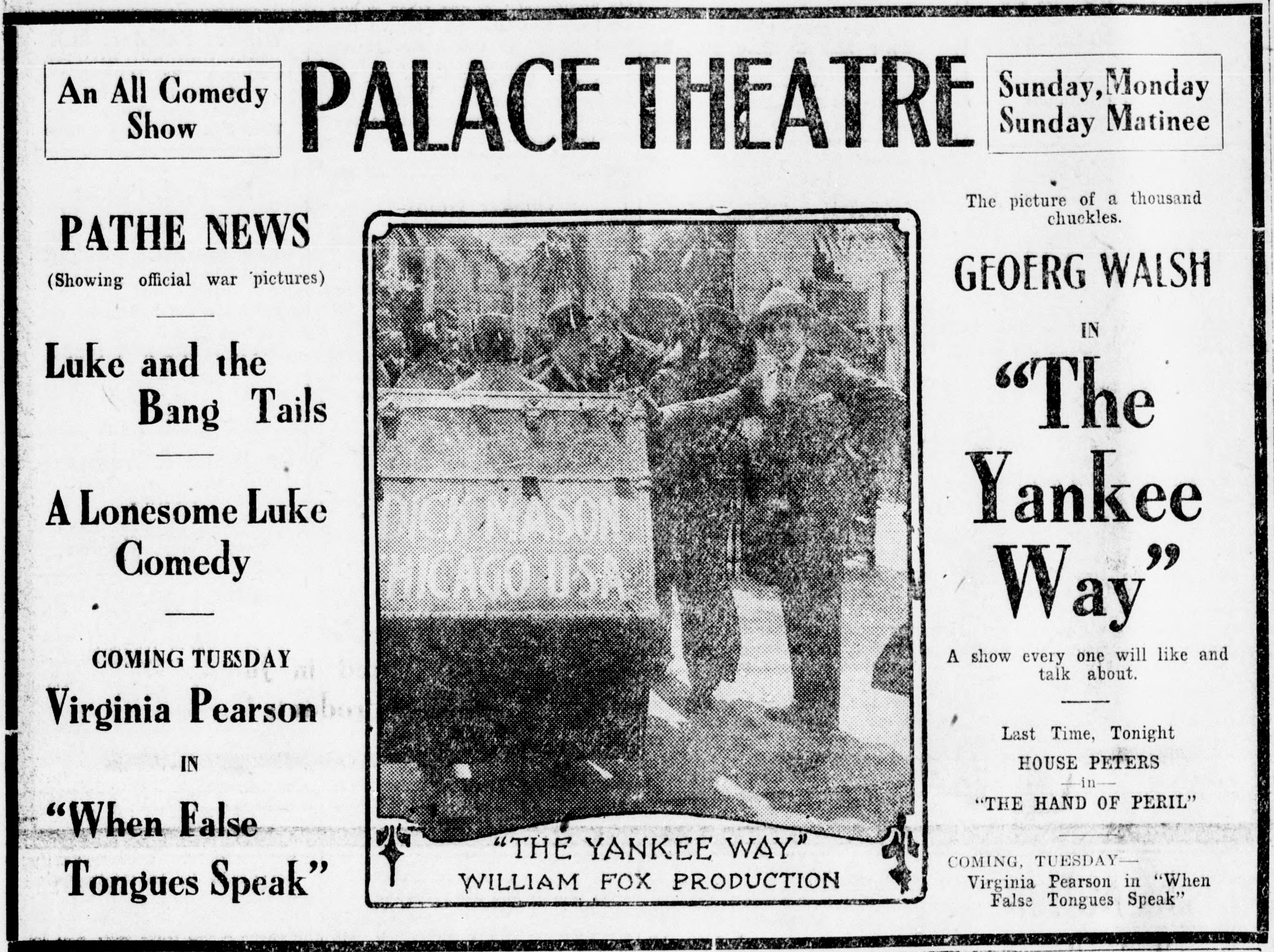
- Newspaper advertisement
- Directed by: Richard Stanton
- Written by: Edward Sedgwick; Ralph H. Spence
- Produced by: William Fox
- Starring: George Walsh; Enid Markey; Joseph J. Dowling
- Production company: Fox Film
- Distributed by: Fox Film
- Release date: September 15, 1917
- Running time: 50 minutes
- Country: United States
- Languages: Silent; English intertitles

The Yankee Way is a 1917 American silent comedy-drama film directed by Richard Stanton and starring George Walsh, Enid Markey and Joseph J. Dowling.

== Cast ==
- George Walsh as Dick Mason
- Enid Markey as Princess Alexia
- Joseph J. Dowling as Colonel Mason
- Charles Edler as 'Coyote' Jones
- James O'Shea as James O'Malley
- Edward Sedgwick as Robert Gillette
- Fritz von Hardenberg as Baron Maravitch
- Edward Cecil as Count Vortsky
- Tom Wilson as George Washington Brown

== Bibliography ==
- Solomon, Aubrey. The Fox Film Corporation, 1915-1935: A History and Filmography. McFarland, 2011.
