= The Mating (1915 film) =

Lost 1915 silent film by Raymond B. West

- Directed by: Raymond B. West
- Written by: C. Gardner Sullivan (scenario)
- Produced by: Thomas H. Ince
- Starring: Bessie Barriscale; Lew Cody; Enid Markey
- Production company: New York Motion Picture Corporation
- Distributed by: Mutual Film
- Release date: July 22, 1915
- Running time: 5 reels (approximately 75 minutes)
- Country: United States
- Languages: Silent film (English intertitles)

The Mating is a 1915 silent film directed by Raymond B. West, starring Bessie Barriscale, Lew Cody, and Enid Markey. It was produced by Thomas H. Ince with the New York Motion Picture Corporation, and was written by both Ince and C. Gardner Sullivan. The film is now believed to be a lost film.

== Plot ==
Doris Willard, a country girl whose father is a local minister, goes off to college for a year, her lifelong dream. She is immediately met with scorn by the other girls at college, leading Doris to feel isolated. In a desperate attempt to get attention, she writes a fake love letter from sports star 'Bullet Dick' Ames in which he asks for her hand in marriage. Then, she plants it where people at the college will surely find it, hoping that the publicity will slingshot her to college stardom. Daisy Arnold, a fellow attendee at the college, finds the letter. She sees through the lie and concocts a scheme to publicly expose Doris' lie.

Daisy sends her own letter to Dick and his sister, Eleanor, inviting them to the college for the upcoming holidays. Daisy's letter explains how Doris is faking a marriage proposal. However, Dick decides to go along with the lie to avoid embarrassing Doris. When the Ameses arrive, Dick tells Daisy and her clique that he is an "old friend" of Doris'. Him and Doris end up actually falling in love, but when he proposes for real, Doris rejects him because she thinks he is only proposing out of pity. Luckily, Eleanor convinces her that Dick's feelings for her are real, and the couple ends up happily together.

== Cast ==
- Bessie Barriscale as Doris Willard
- Lew Cody as 'Bullet Dick' Ames (credited as Lewis J. Cody)
- Enid Markey as Daisy Arnold
- Walt Whitman as Reverend Phelps Willard (credited as Walter Whitman)
- Ida Lewis as Miss Fitch
- Margaret Thompson as Eleanor Ames
- Nona Thomas (featured only in the October 21, 1916 reissue)

Multiple members of the University of Southern California football team appeared in the film as background actors.

== Reception ==
Variety gave The Mating a mixed review on July 16, 1915, but Motion Picture News and Moving Picture World recounted much more positive reactions on July 24 and October 30, respectively.
