= Tom Wilson (actor) =

American actor (1880–1965)

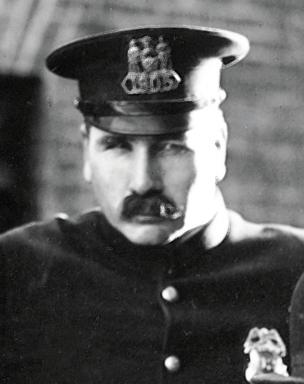
- Wilson as the cop in The Kid, 1921
- Born: August 27, 1880; Helena, Montana, U.S.
- Died: February 19, 1965 (aged 84); Los Angeles, California, U.S.
- Occupation: Actor
- Years active: 1915–1963

Tom Wilson (August 27, 1880 – February 19, 1965) was an American film actor.

== Biography ==
Wilson was born in Helena, Montana, in 1880. Appearing in more than 300 films between 1915 and 1963, Wilson had notable supporting roles in the silent film era, like "The Kindly Officer" in D. W. Griffith's epic Intolerance (1916), the angry policeman in Charlie Chaplin's The Kid (1921), and a boxing coach in Buster Keaton's comedy Battling Butler (1926). After the rise of sound film, he played smaller roles for the rest of his long film career. Wilson died in 1965 in Los Angeles, California.

== Selected filmography ==
- Little Marie (1915)
- The Highbinders (1915)
- The Lucky Transfer (1915)
- The Birth of a Nation (1915)
- Martyrs of the Alamo (1915)
- A Yankee from the West (1915)
- The Half-Breed (1916)
- The Children Pay (1916)
- Intolerance (1916)
- Hell-to-Pay Austin (1916)
- The Americano (1916)
- Pay Me! (1917)
- The Yankee Way (1917)
- Shoulder Arms (1918)
- A Dog's Life (1918)
- Cheating the Public (1918)
- The Bond (1918)
- The Greatest Question (1919)
- A Day's Pleasure (1919)
- Sunnyside (1919)
- The Professor (1919)
- Dinty (1920)
- The Kid (1921)
- Scrap Iron (1921)
- Two Minutes to Go (1921)
- Where Men Are Men (1921)
- Red Hot Romance (1922)
- Reported Missing (1922)
- My Wife's Relations (1922)
- Minnie (1922)
- Good-By Girls! (1923)
- The Remittance Woman (1923)
- Itching Palms (1923)
- The Love Bandit (1924)
- On Time (1924)
- The Heart Buster (1924)
- Fools in the Dark (1924)
- Secrets of the Night (1924)
- His Darker Self (1924)
- What Fools Men (1925)
- California Straight Ahead (1925)
- Manhattan Madness (1925)
- Madame Behave (1925)
- The Best Bad Man (1925)
- The Million Dollar Handicap (1925)
- Seven Days (1925)
- Battling Butler (1926)
- No Control (1927)
- Bring Home the Turkey (1927)
- Ham and Eggs at the Front (1927)
- Riley the Cop (1928)
- Strong Boy (1929)
- Dark Skies (1929)
- Road to Paradise (1930)
- Picture Snatcher (1933)
- Devil's Island (1939)
- Flaxy Martin (1949)
- The Young Philadelphians (1959)
- Critic's Choice (1963)
