= Arthur L. Bristol =

US Navy vice admiral (1886–1942)

Arthur LeRoy Bristol, Jr.
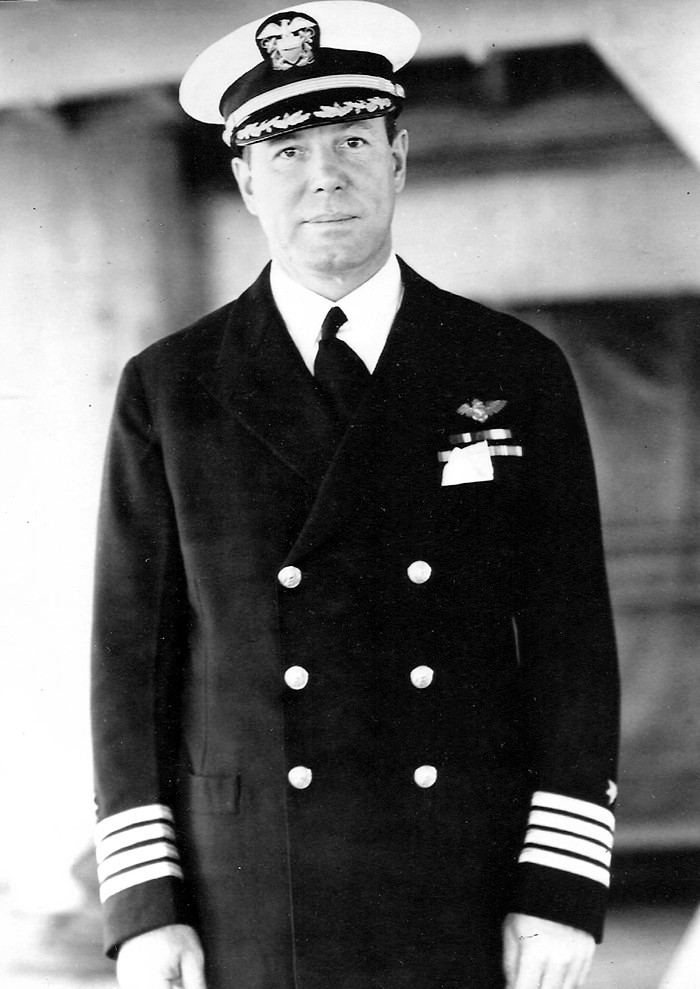
- Born: July 15, 1886; Charleston, South Carolina, U.S.
- Died: April 27, 1942 (aged 55); Argentia, Newfoundland, Canada
- Military career
- Allegiance: United States
- Branch: United States Navy
- Service years: 1906–1942
- Rank: Vice admiral
- Commands: USS Ranger (CV-4); Support Force, U.S. Atlantic Fleet
- Conflicts: World War I World War II
- Awards: Navy Cross; Navy Distinguished Service Medal; Army Distinguished Service Medal

Arthur LeRoy Bristol, Jr. (July 15, 1886 – April 27, 1942) was a vice admiral in the United States Navy, who held important commands during World War I and World War II, and was an early aircraft carrier commander.

== Early life and career ==
Born in Charleston, South Carolina, he entered the United States Naval Academy on September 23, 1902, and graduated with the Class of 1906. After the prescribed two years of sea duty, which he served in the pre-dreadnought USS Illinois (Battleship No. 7), he received his commission as ensign in 1908. Transferred to Mayflower in 1909, he remained in that Presidential yacht until ordered to Berlin, Germany, in January 1912 for a year and one-half as a naval attaché. In June 1913, he returned home to command the new destroyer Cummings (Destroyer No. 44) upon her completion at Bath Iron Works. A year later, he received the concurrent command of Terry (Destroyer No. 25) and the 2nd Division, Reserve Torpedo Flotilla, U.S. Atlantic Fleet. He then briefly commanded Jarvis (Destroyer No. 38).

== World War I ==
Late in 1915, Bristol was assigned the duties of aide and torpedo officer on the staff of Commander, Torpedo Flotilla, Atlantic Fleet and, in the winter of 1916, he became aide and flag secretary to the Commander, Destroyer Force, Atlantic Fleet. In the summer of 1917, soon after the United States entered World War I, he became aide and flag secretary for Commander, Cruiser Force, Atlantic Fleet. After serving in that capacity into the following winter, Bristol was awarded the Navy Cross for his service as flag secretary and acting chief of staff to Commander, Cruiser and Transport Force. While holding that post, he worked closely with Army authorities in the handling of troopship movements.

Later, as flag secretary for the Commander, Cruiser and Transport Force, he earned the Distinguished Service Medal. Going ashore in February 1918, he labored in Washington through the end of World War I and into the spring of 1919 on duty in the Office of the Chief of Naval Operations.

== Russian Civil War ==
Bristol then commanded Breckinridge (DD-148) and Overton (DD-239) in succession, serving in the latter during that ship's operations in the Black Sea during the capitulation of White Russian forces to the Bolsheviks in November 1920. For his services rendered during the evacuation of the Crimea, a grateful Russian Empire government in exile presented him with the Order of St. Stanislav, III Class.

== Assignments during the interwar years ==
Detached from Overton in August 1921, Bristol again served in Washington attached to the Navy General Board and then went to Philadelphia to assist in the decommissioning of destroyers. A course of instruction at the Naval War College in Newport, Rhode Island, occupied him from July 1922 to May 1923, and he next served as an instructor on the staff of that institution from May 1923 to May 1924. Following a brief tour as aide for Commander, Scouting Fleet, he sailed to Rio de Janeiro, Brazil, to join the American naval mission there.

Reporting to the battleship Arizona (BB-39) in February 1927, Bristol served as executive officer of that dreadnought until April of the following year, and then moved to the Naval Air Station (NAS), San Diego, California, for aviation instruction. Following further flight training at NAS, Pensacola, Florida, he was designated a naval aviator and was sent to the Asiatic Fleet, where he served as commanding officer of the seaplane tender Jason (AV-2) and later, as Commander, Aircraft Squadrons, Asiatic Fleet.

Detached in the spring of 1931, he checked in briefly at the Office of Naval Intelligence in Washington before proceeding on to the United Kingdom to become naval attaché in London on October 1, 1931. A brief stop in the Office of the Chief of Naval Operations upon his return from England in the spring of 1934 preceded his traveling to the Newport News Shipbuilding and Dry Dock Co., Newport News, Virginia, as prospective commanding officer of the new aircraft carrier Ranger (CV-4).

== Carrier commander ==
The first commanding officer of the Navy's first aircraft carrier to be built as such from the keel up, Bristol took Ranger to South American waters on shakedown and commanded her thereafter until June 1936, when he became Commanding Officer NAS, San Diego. During the latter tour, he served on the Hepburn Board, participating in the investigations into suitable base sites in the United States and its possessions.

Becoming Commander, Patrol Wing 2, at Pearl Harbor, on July 27, 1939, Bristol was given flag rank on August 1, and, the following summer, became Commander Carrier Division 1. He then served as Commander, Aircraft, Scouting Force (September 18 to October 12, 1940), and as Commander, Patrol Wings, United States Fleet (October 12, 1940, to January 23, 1941) before reporting to the Office of the Chief of Naval Operations on January 25, 1941.

== World War II ==
With increasing American alarm over the course of the Battle of the Atlantic, the Roosevelt administration took steps to aid the British. To help escort convoys across the Atlantic, the Navy established the Support Force, U.S. Atlantic Fleet, and based it at Newport. On March 1, 1941, Rear Admiral Bristol became the Force's first commander. He held this important position throughout the tense, undeclared war with Germany in the summer and autumn of 1941 and through America's entry into the global conflict on December 7, of that year. Designated vice admiral on February 27, 1942, Bristol remained in that important command until he suffered a fatal heart attack at NS Argentia, Newfoundland, on April 27, 1942.

== Namesake ==
The destroyer escort USS Arthur L Bristol (DE-281) was named in honor of Vice Admiral Bristol. She was converted during construction into the high-speed transport USS Arthur L. Bristol (APD-97), and was in commission as such from 1945 to 1946.

The Arthur L. Bristol School, which educated the children of U.S. Navy personnel between 1957 and 1995 at Naval Air Station Argentia, Newfoundland, also was named for Vice Admiral Bristol.
