= The Adventures of Tarzan =

1921 film by Scott Sidney, Robert F. Hill

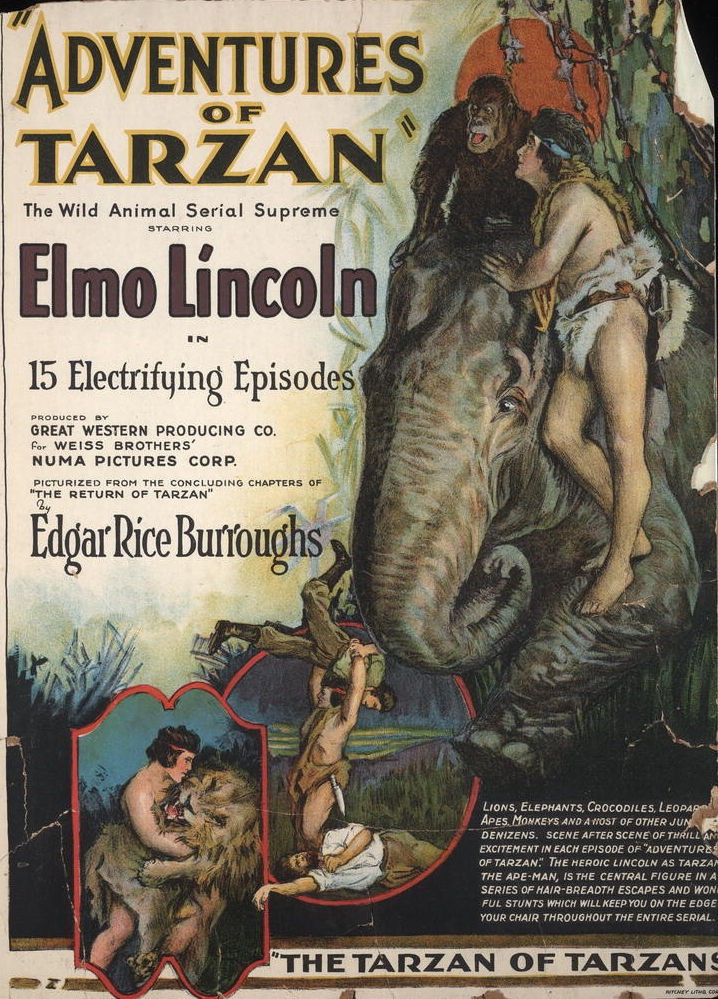
- Directed by: Robert F. Hill; Scott Sidney
- Written by: Robert F. Hill; Lillian Valentine based on novels by Edgar Rice Burroughs
- Produced by: Louis Weiss
- Starring: Elmo Lincoln; Louise Lorraine; Scott Pembroke; Frank Whitson; Lillian Worth
- Production company: Great Western Producing Company
- Distributed by: Numa Pictures Corporation
- Release date: December 1, 1921 (first chapter)
- Running time: 15 chapters
- Country: United States
- Languages: Silent; English Intertitles

The Adventures of Tarzan (1921) is a 15 chapter movie serial which features the third and final appearance of Elmo Lincoln as Tarzan. The serial was produced by Louis Weiss, written by Robert F. Hill and Lillian Valentine (partially based on the novels The Return of Tarzan and Tarzan and the Jewels of Opar by Edgar Rice Burroughs), and directed by Robert F. Hill and Scott Sidney. The first chapter was released on December 1, 1921.

== Plot ==
The Adventures of Tarzan

The serial's prologue features Edgar Rice Burroughs himself.

Tarzan rescues Jane from Arab slave traders after they become marooned in Africa. They return to the cabin where his parents lived before their deaths. Jane is captured by Queen La of Opar, taken to that hidden city, and is to be made a sacrifice. Tarzan rescues her and they escape. Nikolas Rokoff and William Cecil Clayton, the usurper to Tarzan's title of Lord Greystoke, learn that Jane has a map to the city (which contains fabulous riches in exotic jewels), tattooed onto her back. They kidnap her and attempt to loot the city. Tarzan braves many perils, finally rescues Jane, defeats the villains and escapes La's amorous clutches.

== Cast ==
- Elmo Lincoln as Tarzan
- Louise Lorraine as Jane Porter
- Scott Pembroke as William Cecil Clayton, Cousin of Tarzan, Usurper to Title of Lord Greystoke
- Frank Whitson as Nikolas Rokoff, A Villain
- Lillian Worth as Queen La of Opar, A Villainess In Love With Tarzan
- Charles Inslee as Professor Porter, Jane's Father
- Zip Monberg as Monsieur Gernot (credited as George Monberg)
- Charles Gay as Sheik Ben Ali
- Maceo Bruce Sheffield as Chief of Wazini
- Fifi R. Lachoy
- Frank Merrill as Arab Guard
- George B. French
- Gordon Griffith
- Thomas Jefferson

== Production ==
The success of the serial The Son of Tarzan inspired Great Western Producing Company to approach Tarzan's creator Edgar Rice Burroughs about making another Tarzan serial. However, the rights for another Tarzan film were still retained by the Weiss brothers' Numa Pictures Corporation, the makers of the feature film The Revenge of Tarzan. When Numa discovered that Great Western had Elmo Lincoln, the first screen Tarzan, signed to play the lead, they agreed to a deal in which Great Western would produce the film, while Numa would handle distribution. The story was based partially on two of the Tarzan novels, The Return of Tarzan and Tarzan and the Jewels of Opar, with the addition of some new material. The desert scenes were filmed in Arizona.

=== Casting ===
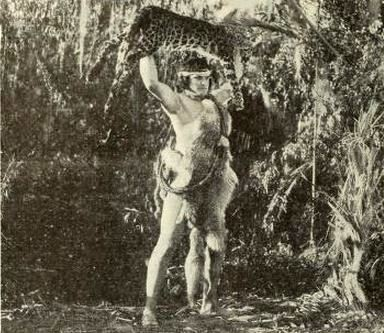
Tarzan holding a leopard's corpse over his head in The Adventures of Tarzan

This serial marked Elmo Lincoln's return to the part of Tarzan, whom he was the first to play, but it was also Lincoln's last time as the character. The serial was advertised as "Censor-proof." Nevertheless, censorship forced the previously bare-chested Lincoln to cover up and wear an over-the-shoulder-styled costume for this production. Louise Lorraine celebrated her sixteenth birthday during production. As advertised, "Joe Martin, famous screen ape, plays a leading part."

Production started January 1 and finished August 13, 1921.

=== Stunts ===
Frank Merrill began doubling Lincoln about halfway through the serial. Lincoln was insured for $150,000, and the insurers were not happy with him doing his own stunts. Seven years later, Merrill was cast as the apeman in Tarzan the Mighty.

== Release ==
For marketing purposes, The Adventures of Tarzan Serial Sales Corporation was formed in New York. The serial sold in half of all available markets without the use of a road man. Within three months of the completion date, it had sold out in most countries world wide. Despite rumours circulated that the serial was not new material, but just a rehash of footage from previous Tarzan films, The Adventures of Tarzan was a successful film and one of the top four attractions of the year. The film was reedited and released with sound effects twice—first in 1928, and a second time in 1935.

== Critical reception ==
The Exhibitors Herald wrote, "Elmo Lincoln as Tarzan is too well known to theater-goers to need further introduction. His red-blooded fights, staged in each episode, will evoke applause from the serial audience." Film Fun Magazine wrote, "There are enough wild animals introduced in each episode to keep the younger generation, which has shown a predilection for the serial form of entertainment, whooping her up."

== Influence ==
The success of the serial inspired a Broadway show, Tarzan of the Apes, but critics attacked it as fit only for film and unsuitable for the stage.

== Survival status ==
The complete fifteen-chapter version has not survived. The version available on DVD is the 1928 ten-chapter rerelease. The ten-chapter version can also be viewed at the Internet Archive. The first thirteen chapters survive in 16mm film at the Niles Essanay Silent Film Archive. The UCLA Film and Television Archive has restored chapter 11: "The Hidden Foe". Silent Era claims that the archive also has prints of the film and 1928 rerelease.

The Library of Congress possesses a window card for the film.

== Original book chapter titles ==
1. Jungle Romance
2. The City of Gold
3. The Sun Death
4. Stalking Death
5. Flames of Hate
6. The Ivory Tomb
7. The Jungle Trap
8. The Tornado
9. Fangs of the Lion
10. The Simoon
11. The Hidden Foe
12. Dynamite Trail
13. The Jungle's Fury
14. Flaming Arrows
15. The Last Adventure

== 1937 film chapter titles ==
1. Tarzan the Boy
2. Tarzan's Revenge
3. Tarzan to the Rescue
4. Tarzan the Fearless
5. Tarzan's Hide-Out
6. Tarzan's Enemies
7. Tarzan Vanishes
8. Tarzan Conquers
9. Tarzan Faces Death
10. Fighting Tarzan
11. Cyclone Tarzan
12. Fangs vs. Tarzan
13. Message from Tarzan

== Novel ==
The Adventures of Tarzan
- Author: Maude Robinson Toombs
- Series: Tarzan (book series)
- Publisher: ERBville Press
- Publication date: 2006 (trade paper); 2008 (hardcover)
- Pages: 158
- ISBN: 978-1-4357-4973-3
- Preceded by: Tarzan the Mighty (2005)
- Followed by: The Greystoke Legacy (2011)

Originally written as a 15-part serial for newspapers in 1921, it was collected and published as a trade paperback (ISBN 978-1-4357-4973-3) by ERBville Press in January 2006. The book became available as a hardcover via Lulu.com in 2008.

=== Chapters ===
1. Jungle Romance
2. The City of Gold
3. The Sun Death
4. Stalking Death
5. Flames of Hate
6. The Ivory Tomb
7. The Jungle Trap
8. The Tornado
9. Fangs of the Lion
10. The Simoon
11. The Slave Market
12. Dynamite Trail
13. The Jungle's Prey
14. The Flaming Arrow
15. The Last Adventure

Preceded by The Dark Heart of Time	Tarzan series The Adventures of Tarzan	Succeeded by Tarzan: The Greystoke Legacy
