= Elmo Lincoln =

American actor (1889–1952)

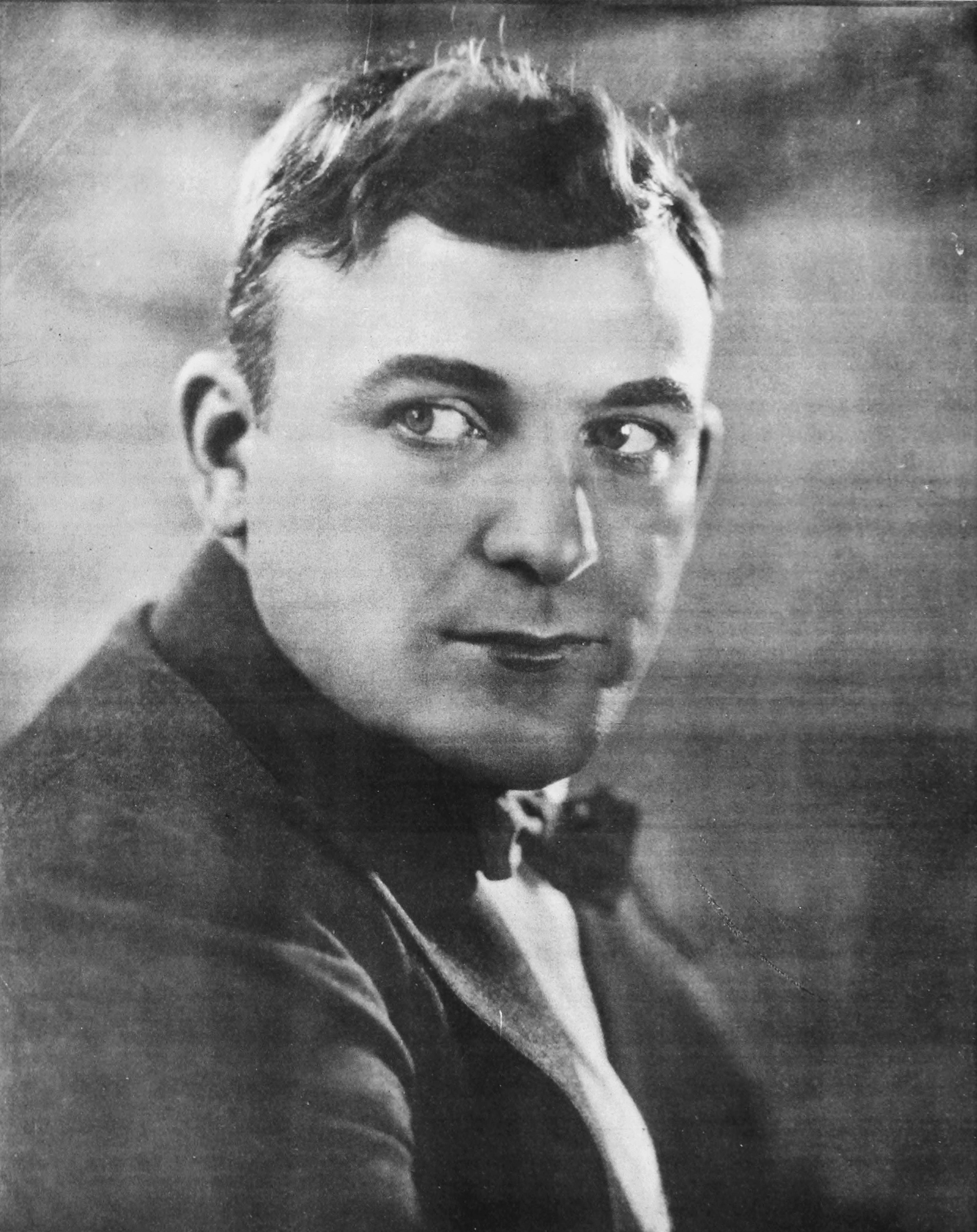
- Lincoln in 1924
- Born: Otto Elmo Linkenhelt; February 6, 1889; Rochester, Indiana, U.S.
- Died: June 27, 1952 (aged 63); Los Angeles, California, U.S.
- Resting place: Hollywood Forever Cemetery
- Occupation: Film actor
- Years active: 1913–1952
- Spouse(s): Sadie Whited (1913–1921); Ida Lee Tanchick (1935–?)

Elmo Lincoln (born Otto Elmo Linkenhelt; February 6, 1889 – June 27, 1952) was an American stage and film actor whose career in motion pictures spanned the silent and sound eras. He performed in over 100 screen productions between 1913 and 1952, and was the first actor to portray on film novelist Edgar Rice Burroughs' fictional "jungle" character Tarzan, initially appearing in that role in the 1918 release Tarzan of the Apes.

== Early years ==
Lincoln was born Otto Elmo Linkenhelt in Rochester, Indiana. He had six siblings, and he left home at 18 to begin a railroad career as a brakeman on a train. He went on to be a boxer, sailor, and stevedore before he became an actor.

== Career ==
Lincoln began acting for director D. W. Griffith, who changed the performer's name. Lincoln's first role was in The Battle of Elderbush Gulch (1914), followed by Judith of Bethula (1914), The Birth of a Nation (1915), and Intolerance (1916).

== Tarzan films ==
Stellan Windrow, who initially portrayed the title character in 1918's Tarzan of the Apes, went into military service five weeks after filming began. Lincoln replaced Windrow, although author Edgar Rice Burroughs objected to the choice. Lincoln became best known for that role. (Gordon Griffith played Tarzan as a child in the same movie). He portrayed the character twice more—in The Romance of Tarzan (also 1918) and in the 1921 serial The Adventures of Tarzan.

Following the end of the silent movie era, Elmo left Hollywood and tried his hand at mining. He also had a salvage business in Salt Lake City. In the late 1930s, he returned to the film industry, most often employed as an extra. He appeared, uncredited, in two Tarzan films in the 1940s—as a circus roustabout in Tarzan's New York Adventure (1942), and as a fisherman repairing his net in Tarzan's Magic Fountain (1949).

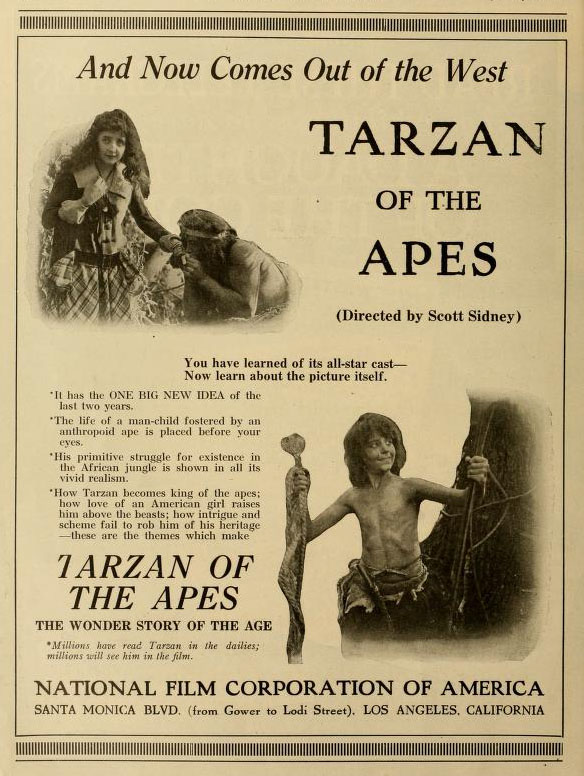
Tarzan of the Apes (1918)

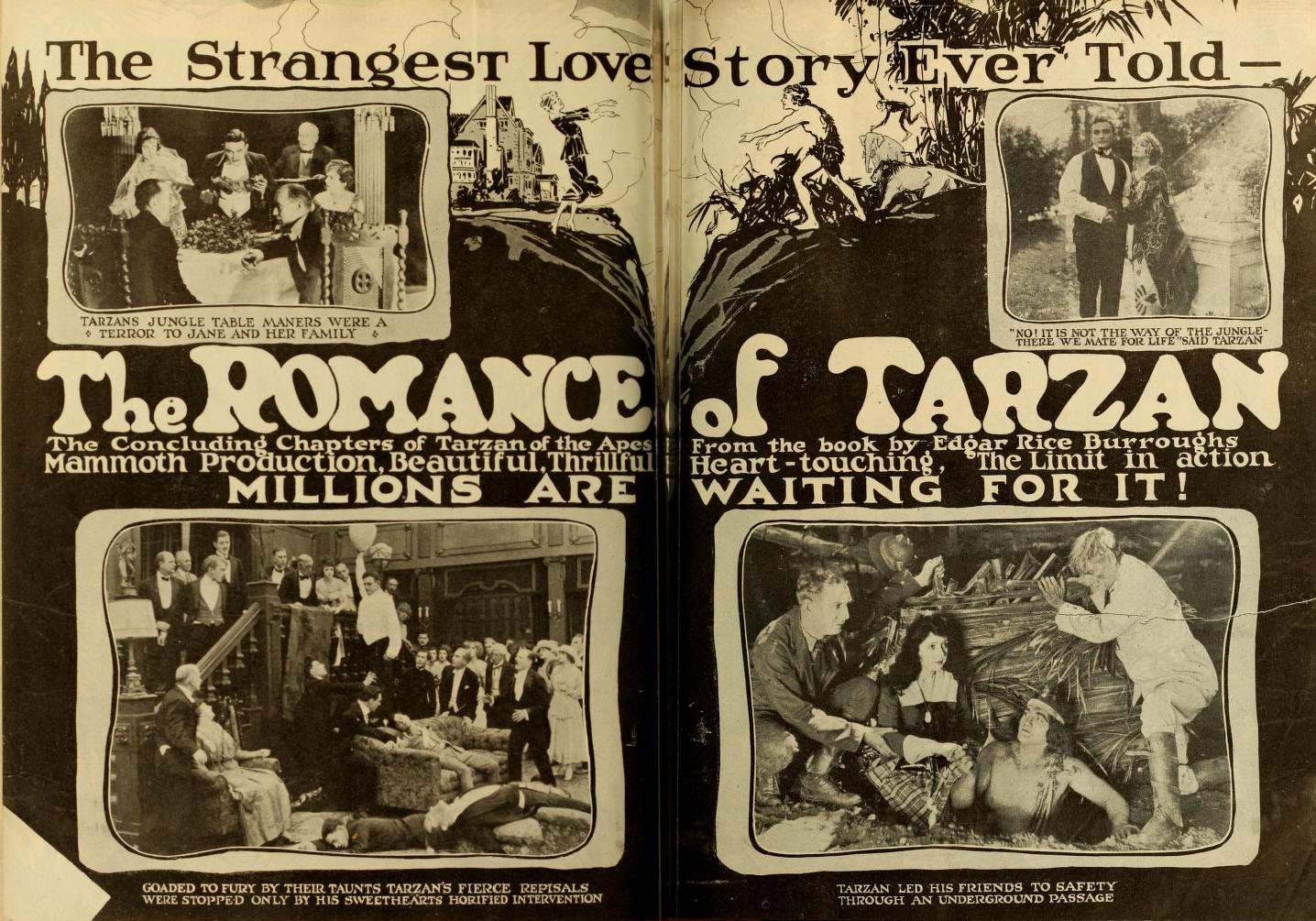
The Romance of Tarzan (1918)

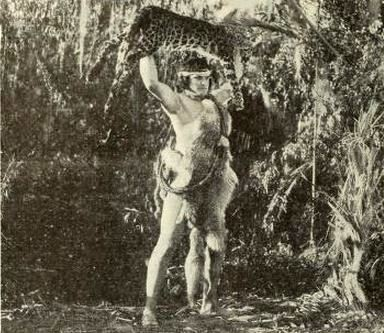
Tarzan's agility, speed, and strength allow him to kill a Leopard in 1921's The Adventures of Tarzan.

== Final role ==
His final work saw him also playing a brief, uncredited role in the 1952 film Carrie, starring Laurence Olivier. According to Tarzan of the Movies, by Gabe Essoe, Lincoln was quite proud of his work in this film, as he was an admirer of Olivier.

== Death ==
Lincoln died of a heart attack on June 27, 1952, at age 63. He is interred in a niche at Hollywood Forever Cemetery.

For his contribution to the motion picture industry, he has a star on the Hollywood Walk of Fame at 7042 Hollywood Boulevard.

== Biography ==
Lincoln's daughter, Marci'a Lincoln Rudolph, recounts his life in her 2001 book My Father, Elmo Lincoln: The Original Tarzan (ISBN 1-58690-000-5).

== Partial filmography ==
=== 1910s ===
- The Battle at Elderbush Gulch (1913, Short) - Cavalryman
- John Barleycorn (1914)
- Judith of Bethulia (1914)
- Brute Force (1914, Short) - In Club (Prologue) / Tribesman (The Old Days)
- Buckshot John (1915) - The Sheriff
- The Birth of a Nation (1915) - Blacksmith (uncredited)
- The Slave Girl (1915, Short) - Bob West
- The Absentee (1915) - The Toiler - in the Prologue
- Her Shattered Idol (1915) - Ben - a Blacksmith
- Jordan Is a Hard Road (1915)
- Hoodoo Ann (1916) - Officer Lambert
- The Half Breed (1916) - The Doctor (uncredited)
- Gretchen the Greenhorn (1916) - Mystery Ship Captain
- Intolerance (1916) - The Mighty Man of Valor (uncredited)
- The Children of the Feud (1916) - Bad Bald Clayton
- The Fatal Glass of Beer (1916)
- The Bad Boy (1917) - Yeggman
- Betsy's Burglar (1917)
- Might and the Man (1917) - McFadden
- Aladdin and the Wonderful Lamp (1917) - Magic Genie
- Treasure Island (1918) - Prologue Player
- Tarzan of the Apes (1918) - Tarzan
- The Kaiser, the Beast of Berlin (1918) - Marcas, the Blacksmith
- The Romance of Tarzan (1918) - Tarzan
- The Greatest Thing in Life (1918) - The American Soldier
- The Road Through the Dark (1918) - Pvt. Schultz
- Elmo the Mighty (1919) - Capt. Elmo Armstrong
- The Fall of Babylon (re-edited from Intolerance) (1919) - The Mighty Man of Valour

=== 1920s ===
- Elmo the Fearless (1920) - The Stranger
- Under Crimson Skies (1920) - Captain Yank Barstow
- The Flaming Disc (1920) - Elmo Gray / Jim Gray
- Devotion (1921) - Robert Trent
- The Adventures of Tarzan (1921) - Tarzan
- Quincy Adams Sawyer (1922) - Abner Stiles
- Rupert of Hentzau (1923) - Simon
- The Hunchback of Notre Dame (1923) - (uncredited)
- The Rendezvous (1923) - Godunoff
- Fashion Row (1923) - Kaminoff
- All Around Frying Pan (1925) - Foreman Slade
- Whom Shall I Marry (1926)
- King of the Jungle (1927, Serial)

=== 1930s ===
- Union Pacific (1939) - Card Player (uncredited)
- Blue Montana Skies (1939) - Mack (uncredited)
- Wyoming Outlaw (1939) - U.S. Marshal Gregg
- Timber Stampede (1939) - Townsman (uncredited)
- Colorado Sunset (1939) - Dairyman Burns
- The Real Glory (1939) - Townsman (uncredited)
- The Hunchback of Notre Dame (1939) - Minor Role (uncredited)

=== 1940s ===
- Stage to Chino (1940) - Townsman (uncredited)
- Reap the Wild Wind (1942) - Minor Role (uncredited)
- Tarzan's New York Adventure (1942) - Circus Roustabout (uncredited)
- Bandit Ranger (1942) - Townsman in Bank (uncredited)
- Fighting Frontier (1943) - Barfly who knocks Ike down (uncredited)
- Frontier Fury (1943) - Sam Stewart (uncredited)
- The Story of Dr. Wassell (1944) - Minor Role (uncredited)
- Black Arrow (1944, Serial) - Chief Arano (uncredited)
- When the Lights Go On Again (1944) - Farmer #2 (uncredited)
- The Man Who Walked Alone (1945) - Turnkey
- Escape in the Fog (1945) - Cop (uncredited)
- The Return of the Durango Kid (1945) - Luke Blake (uncredited)
- Badman's Territory (1946) - Dick Broadwell (uncredited)
- Rolling Home (1947) - Racing Official
- A Double Life (1947) - Detective (uncredited)
- Tap Roots (1948) - Sergeant (uncredited)
- Tarzan's Magic Fountain (1949) - A Fisherman (uncredited)

=== 1950s ===
- Hollywood Story (1951) - Elmo Lincoln (uncredited)
- Iron Man (1951) - Minor Role (uncredited)
- Carrie (1952) - Minor Role (uncredited) (final film role)
