= Passers By =

Passers By may refer to:

- Passers By (1920 film), an American silent drama film, based on the play
- Passers By (1916 film), an American silent drama film, based on the play
- Passers By (play), a 1911 play by C. Haddon Chambers
