= Down the Stretch =

Down the Stretch may refer to:

- Down the Stretch (1936 film), an American drama film
- Down the Stretch (1927 film), an American drama film
