= Private Izzy Murphy =

1926 film by Lloyd Bacon

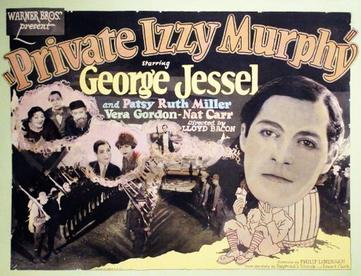
- Movie poster
- Directed by: Lloyd Bacon
- Written by: Philip Lonergan (adaptation)
- Story by: Raymond L. Schrock; Edward Clark
- Starring: George Jessel; Patsy Ruth Miller
- Cinematography: Virgil Miller
- Production company: Warner Bros.
- Distributed by: Warner Bros.
- Release date: October 30, 1926 (US); (Limited release)
- Running time: 85 minutes
- Country: United States
- Language: Silent (English intertitles)
- Budget: $157,000
- Box office: $373,000

Private Izzy Murphy is a 1926 American silent comedy-drama film with Vitaphone sound effects, starring George Jessel, and Patsy Ruth Miller. The film was released by Warner Bros. It is unknown if a copy survives meaning it could be a lost film. The film was followed up by Sailor Izzy Murphy.

== Plot ==
Isadore Goldberg, an enterprising Russian Jew, comes to the United States and establishes himself in the delicatessen business so that he can one day send for his parents. Forced to vacate his store, Izzy relocates in an Irish neighborhood; there, after he changes his surname to "Murphy," his business prospers. While waiting for a subway train, Izzy recovers a girl's handkerchief; later, he meets her in his store and learns that she is Eileen Cohannigan, from whose father he buys foodstuffs. After the arrival of Izzy's parents, he embarks for France with an all-Irish regiment and inspires his comrades to deeds of valor. He is welcomed home by Cohannigan, but when Cohannigan learns that he is Jewish, he denounces his daughter for loving him. With the aid of his service buddies, however, Izzy and Eileen head for City Hall to be married.

== Cast ==
- George Jessel as Isadore 'Izzy' Goldberg, posing as I. Patrick Murphy
- Patsy Ruth Miller as Eileen Cohannigan
- Vera Gordon as Sara Goldberg
- Nat Carr as The Shadchen, Moe Ginsberg
- William H. Strauss as Jacob Goldberg
- Spec O'Donnell as The Monohan Kid
- Gustav von Seyffertitz as Cohannigan
- Douglas Gerrard as Robert O'Malley
- Tom Murray as The Attorney
- Rusty Tolbert

== See also ==
- List of early Warner Bros. sound and talking features

== Box office ==
According to Warner Bros records the film earned $304,000 domestically and $69,000 foreign.

== Review ==
When passing under the shamrocks decorating the portals of the Hippodrome one is prepared to find a farce in the new picture there, for its title to "Private Izzy Murphy." Nothing of the soil: this production, in which George Jessel makes his film début, is a dignified fourth cousin of "Abie's Irish Rose." It is a feature that has a decided inclination to be melancholy and to emphasize this mood there is a wealth of tearful close-ups. Mr. Jessel proves his ability to act before the camera, but much of his good, work is wasted on this vehicle. Mr. Jessel wants something less lachrymose and more whimsical. There are scenes in this production that betray little imagination in their direction, and, as happens in many a melodrama, the excitement of the characters, their joy or their sadness, in lieu of causing a sob makes one smile.

—The New York Times
