= Never Say Quit =

1919 film

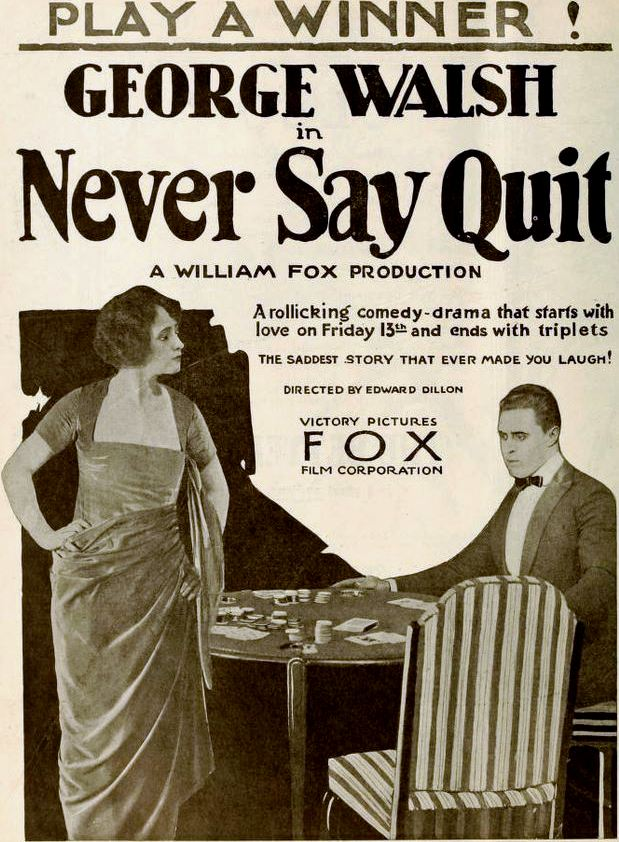
- Advertisement
- Directed by: Edward Dillon
- Written by: Raymond L. Schrock (screenplay and story)
- Starring: George Walsh
- Cinematography: Rial Schellinger
- Distributed by: Fox Film Corporation
- Release date: March 16, 1919 (U.S.)
- Running time: 5 reels
- Country: United States
- Language: Silent (English intertitles)

Never Say Quit is a lost 1919 American silent comedy film directed by Edward Dillon. It was produced and distributed by the Fox Film Corporation.

== Plot ==
As described in a film magazine, Reginald Jones (Walsh) is a jinx and is always getting stung. One of his stunts is to butt in when he sees a woman being ill-treated, and in one adventure is decoyed into a badger game. As a consequence, he loses a fortune when he is unable to attend the funeral of an aunt. He goes to sea on a schooner and the passengers include a rich man and his daughter, who are treasure seekers. The captain is rough and pulls a stunt to get the rich man into his power. Reginald comes to their aid, but it's a tough situation until American sailors from submarine chaser S.C. 143 come to the rescue, jumping the railing and knocking out the villainous crew.

== Cast ==
- George Walsh as Reginald Jones
- Florence Dixon as Helen Lattimore
- Henry Hallam as Professor Lattimore
- William Frederic as Ship Captain
- Frank Jacobs as Shipmate
- Joseph W. Smiley as Uncle Reginald (as Joe Smiley)
- Jean Acker as Vamp
- Joseph P. Mack as Undetermined Role (as Joseph Mack)

== See also ==
- 1937 Fox vault fire
