= Kate Serjeantson =

Welsh stage actress

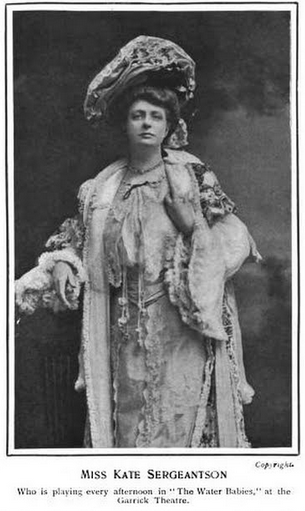
- Sergeantson from a 1904 publication.
- Born: Wales, United Kingdom
- Died: 1918
- Occupation: stage actress

Kate Serjeantson (died 1918) was a Welsh stage actress of the early 20th century who performed in various productions, such as The Case of Lady Camber (1917) and Rambler Rose (1917). In films she was sometimes credited as Kate Sergeantson.

== Partial filmography ==
- Who's Who in Society (1915)
- Passers By (1916)
- Outcast (1917)
- The Beautiful Adventure (1917)
