= The Vice of Fools =

1920 silent film

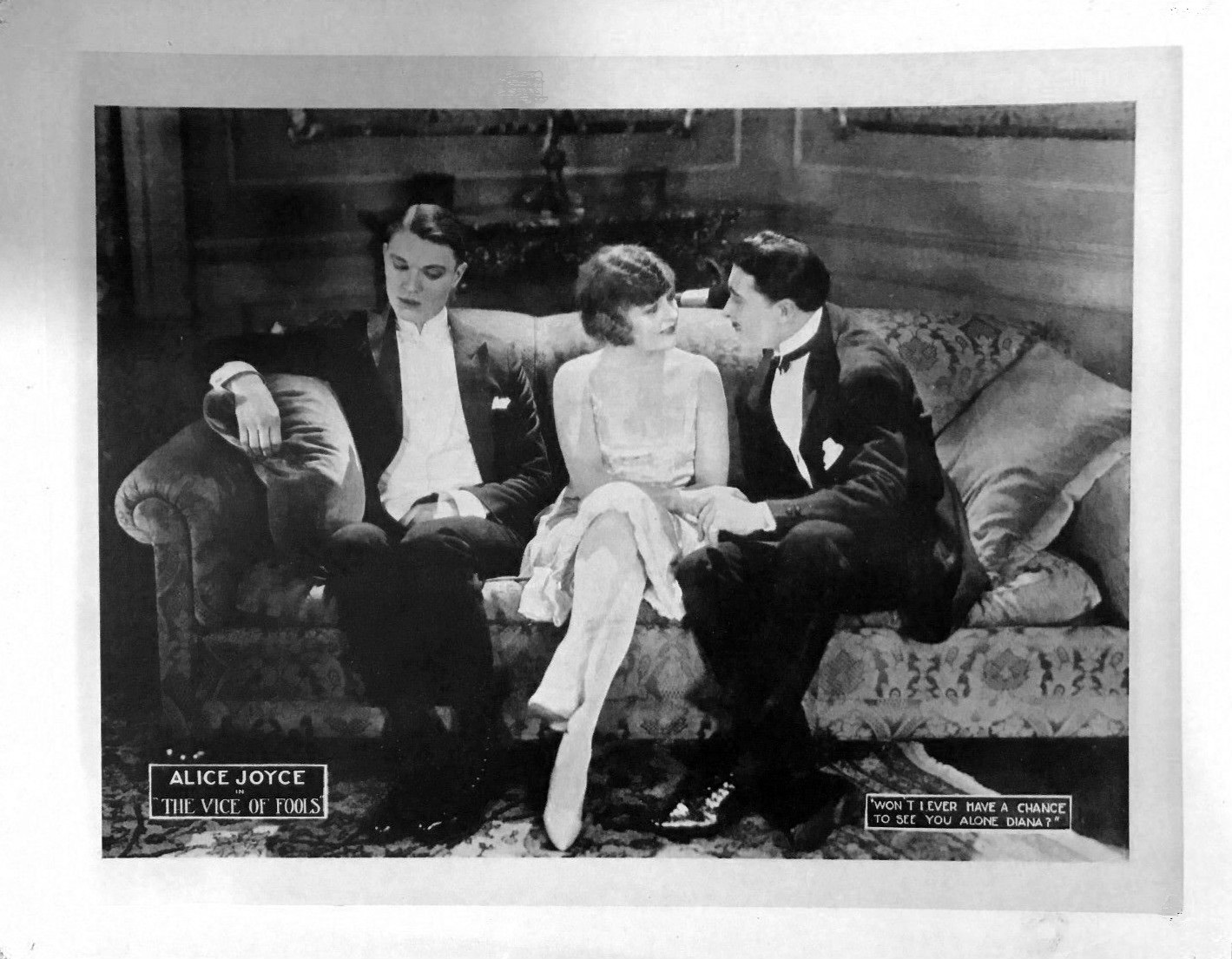
- Lobby card
- Directed by: Edward H. Griffith
- Written by: C. Graham Baker; Francis James
- Produced by: Albert E. Smith
- Starring: Alice Joyce; Ellen Cassity; Robert Gordon
- Cinematography: Joseph Shelderfer
- Production company: Vitagraph Company of America
- Distributed by: Vitagraph Company of America
- Release date: November 1920
- Running time: 50 minutes
- Country: United States
- Language: Silent (English intertitles)

The Vice of Fools is a 1920 American silent drama film directed by Edward H. Griffith and starring Alice Joyce, Ellen Cassity, and Robert Gordon.

== Cast ==
- Alice Joyce as Marion Rogers
- Ellen Cassity as Diana Spaulding
- Robert Gordon as Cameron West
- Raymond Bloomer as Granville Wingate
- William H. Tooker as Stewart Rogers
- Elizabeth Garrison as Mrs. Rogers
- Agnes Everett as Mrs. Spaulding

== Bibliography ==
- Donald W. McCaffrey & Christopher P. Jacobs. Guide to the Silent Years of American Cinema. Greenwood Publishing, 1999. ISBN 0-313-30345-2
