= Black Magic (1929 film) =

1929 film

- Lobby card
- Directed by: George B. Seitz
- Written by: Beulah Marie Dix
- Based on: Cape Smoke 1925 play by Walter Archer Frost Paul Dickey; The Man Between 1913 novel by Walter Archer Frost
- Produced by: William Fox
- Starring: Josephine Dunn
- Cinematography: Glen MacWilliams
- Edited by: Katherine Hilliker
- Distributed by: Fox Film Corporation
- Release date: July 7, 1929
- Running time: 66 minutes
- Country: United States
- Languages: Sound (Synchronized); English Intertitles

Black Magic is a 1929 American Synchronized sound pre-Code drama film directed by George B. Seitz.

While the film has no audible dialogue, it was released with a synchronized musical score with sound effects using both the sound-on-disc and sound-on-film process. The sound was recorded using the Movietone sound system sound-on-film process and then transferred to sound-on-disc format for those theatres who could only play the sound-on-disc format. As of 2024, no prints of the film have survived in archives.

== Cast ==
- Josephine Dunn as Katherine Bradbroke
- Earle Foxe as Hugh Darrell
- John Holland as John Ormsby
- Henry B. Walthall as Dr. Bradbroke
- Dorothy Jordan as Ann Bradbroke
- Fritz Feld as James Fraser
- Sheldon Lewis as Witchdoctor
- Ivan Linow as Zelig
- Blue Washington as Unit

== See also ==
- List of early sound feature films (1926–1929)
