= The Phantom Bullet =

1926 film

- Directed by: Clifford Smith
- Written by: Curtis Benton
- Based on: novel Click of the Triangle T by Oscar J. Friend
- Produced by: Carl Laemmle
- Starring: Hoot Gibson
- Cinematography: Harry Neumann
- Distributed by: Universal Pictures
- Release date: May 9, 1926
- Running time: 6 reels
- Country: United States
- Languages: Silent; English intertitles

The Phantom Bullet is a 1926 American silent Western film directed by Clifford Smith and starring Hoot Gibson. It was produced by Carl Laemmle and distributed by Universal Pictures.

== Cast ==
- Hoot Gibson as Chick Farlane
- Eileen Percy as Jane Terrill
- Allan Forrest as Don Barton
- Pat Harmon as Bill Haynes
- Nelson McDowell as Zack Peters
- William H. Turner as Judge Terrill
- John T. Prince as Tom Farlane Sr.
- Pee Wee Holmes as Short
- Rosemary Cooper as Dolores

== Preservation status ==
The film is preserved at the Library of Congress and UCLA Film & Television Archive.
