= Lure of the Night Club =

1927 silent film

- Directed by: Tom Buckingham
- Written by: Burke Jenkins; Buckleigh Fritz Oxford (scenario)
- Starring: Viola Dana; Robert Ellis; Jack Dougherty
- Cinematography: Robert Newhard
- Production company: Robertson-Cole Pictures Corporation
- Distributed by: Film Booking Offices of America; Ideal Films (UK)
- Release date: May 29, 1927
- Running time: 60 minutes 5,700 feet (1,700 m)
- Country: United States
- Languages: Silent; English intertitles

Lure of the Night Club is a 1927 American silent romantic-drama directed by Tom Buckingham and starring Viola Dana, Robert Ellis and Jack Dougherty. In the film, a showgirl takes a job dancing so she can save her fiancé's damaged farm after a violent storm.

== Plot ==
The plot, as described in The Film Daily and the Library of Congress motion picture copyright description, follows "true blue," jazz-dancing, showgirl Mary Murdock. She returns to her dilapidated family home in the countryside, escorted by show business manager John Stone in a Rolls Royce. Tom Loring, Mary's childhood sweetheart, is living in the farm next door and he enthusiastically greets her with a kiss.

The next day, at cabaret club The Golden Garter, Mary convinces John to cancel her contract so she may give up show business and marry Tom. Though Tom's Aunt Susan makes life difficult, Mary remains committed to her engagement.

Tom travels into town, planning to market an incubator he's invented. While away, a cyclone hits the farm, causing terrible damage and destroying most of the stock and chickens. The repairs and replacing the animals will cost $1,000, which Tom doesn't have.

John brings gifts to the farm on Mary's birthday. She informs him about the farm's troubles, leading John to offer her $3,000 for a two-week engagement dancing in New York City. She accepts the job. Tom returns home just as Mary leaves with John. Believing she has gone to New York for dishonorable reasons, Tom decides to follow Mary so he can denounce her actions and break off their engagement.

Mary returns to Broadway, where she enjoys dancing again. John gives Mary her salary upfront so she can send it to Tom without delay, and she affectionately thanks him backstage. When Tom witnesses this, he begins angrily insulting Mary and her friends. She cuts his rant short by presenting him with a check and explaining the situation. The ungrateful Tom tears up the check and continues to berate her. She breaks up with him and decides to remain on Broadway. When Tom tries to follow Mary, John steps in and punches him in the face.

John tells Mary that her happiness is all that matters, even if that means marrying Tom. Mary reveals that she loves John and she wants to marry him instead.

== Cast ==
- Viola Dana as Mary Murdock
- Robert Ellis as John Stone
- Jack Dougherty as Tom Loring
- Bert Woodruff as Pop Graves
- Lydia Yeamans Titus as Aunt Susan
- Robert Dudley as Hired man
- Barrett Whitelaw as Nightclub Patron
- Rose Blossom as Party Girl
- Cora Williams as Spinster

== Reception ==
The Film Daily gave the film mixed reviews. A positive review claimed, "The small town audience will find 'The Lure of the Night' very much to its liking. The theatrical atmosphere always supplies a certain kick which registers effectively with this crowd." In another review, Lillian W. Brennan simply wrote, "'Lure of the Night Club' tells its story right in the title."

The Exhibitors Herald ran a review by Mrs. Richard A. Preuss of the Arvada Theatre in Arvada, Colorado, who wrote that the film was "Not as good as [Dana's] first releases. Weak and very little comedy in it." Preuss also wrote in The Moving Picture World that it was a "Small bright light picture. Not up to the Dana standard."

Similarly, the magazine Movie Age felt, "Miss Dana has made better pictures than this light program film."

== Bibliography ==
- Robert B. Connelly. The Silents: Silent Feature Films, 1910-36, Volume 40, Issue 2. December Press, 1998.
