= George Kleine =

American film producer (1864–1931)

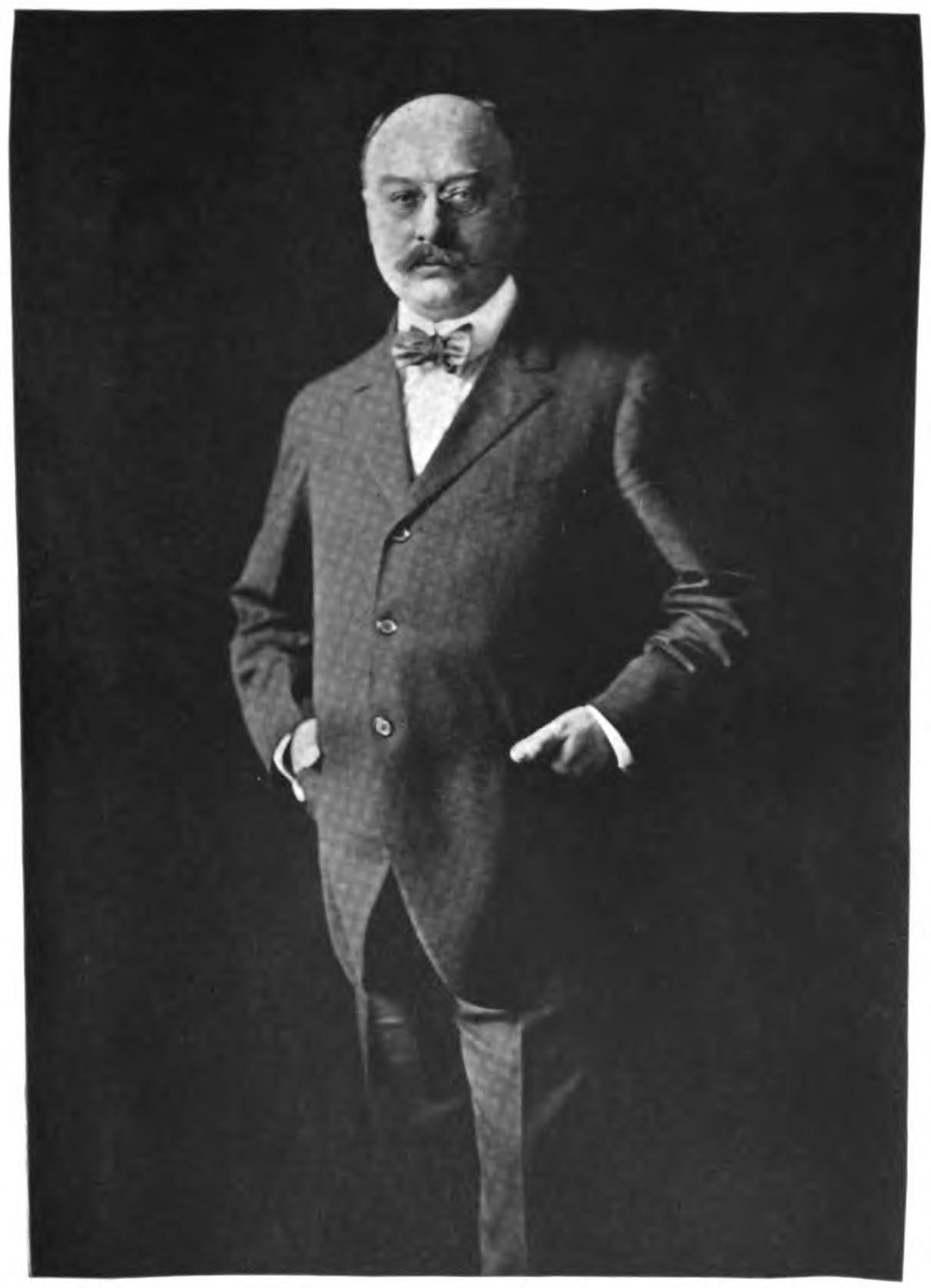
- Kleine c. 1914
- Born: 1864; New York, US
- Died: June 8, 1931 (aged 66–67); Los Angeles, California, US
- Occupation: Film producer
- Years active: 1893-1928

George Kleine (1864 – June 8, 1931) was an early American film producer and distributor in the United States.

== Biography ==
Kleine's father, Charles, was a New York optician who sold optical devices and stereopticons. Kleine joined the family firm, moving to Chicago in 1893 where he set up the Kleine Optical Company. In 1896, the company started selling filmmaking equipment, and in 1899, the company obtained an exclusive arrangement with Thomas Edison to sell his film and equipment in the Chicago area.

In 1903, Kleine started distributing Biograph films as well as European films and was a pioneer in renting films to theatres. He became involved in patent disputes with Thomas Edison in 1908, causing members of the industry to establish the Motion Picture Patents Company. He founded Kalem Company, an American film studio in New York City in 1907 with Samuel Long, and Frank J. Marion. The company was named for their initials, K, L, and M. Kleine. Kleine was involved in the company for only a short period of time; however, it was a profitable investment for him, as his partners were soon successful enough to buy out his shares at a considerable premium.

Kleine was a national distributor of silent movies in the 1910s, a notable example being Essanay Studios' 1918 film, “Men Who Have Made Love to Me” starring Mary MacLane.

Kleine retired in 1928 and died in Los Angeles, California, in 1931. His papers are retained by the Library of Congress.

== Filmography ==
- Buggins (1920)
- Lucky Hoodoo (1920)
- Snakes (1920)
- Where Are Your Husbands? (1920)
- The Lonesome Girl (1918)
- The Starter (1918)
- The Good Sport (1918)
- The Stenog (1918)
- The Man-Eater (1918)
- The Artist's Model (1918)
- The Unbeliever (1918)
- The Superstitious Girl (1918)
- The Bride (1918)
- The Screen Fan (1918)
- One Touch of Nature (1917)
- Gloria's Romance (1916)
- Hold Fast! (1916)
- The Law of Blood (1916)
- The Danger Signal (1915)
- The Politicians (1915)
- The Money Master (1915)
- Who's Who in Society (1915)
- Stop Thief! (1915)
- DuBarry (1915)
- Naidra, the Dream Woman (1914)
- After Death (1913) (writer)
- The Last Days of Pompeii (1913) (Presented By)
- On the Coast of the Bay of Biscay, France (1911)
- Christopher Columbus (1910)
- The Golden Lily (1910)
- Buying A Cow (1908)
- Indians and Cow-Boys (1904)
