= The Runaway Express =

1926 film by Edward Sedgwick

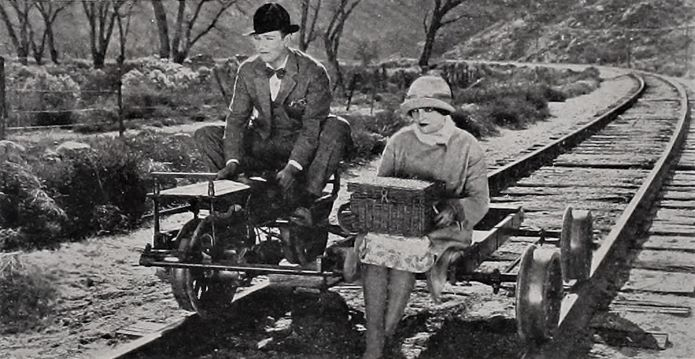
- Still with Dougherty and Mehaffey
- Directed by: Edward Sedgwick
- Written by: Curtis Benton
- Based on: "The Nerve of Foley" by Frank H. Spearman
- Produced by: Carl Laemmle
- Starring: Jack Dougherty; Blanche Mehaffey; Tom O'Brien
- Cinematography: Virgil Miller
- Production company: Universal Pictures
- Distributed by: Universal Pictures
- Release date: October 10, 1926
- Running time: 1 hour
- Country: United States
- Language: Silent (English intertitles)

The Runaway Express is a 1926 American silent action film directed by Edward Sedgwick and starring Jack Dougherty, Blanche Mehaffey, and Tom O'Brien.A print of The Runaway Express exists.

== Plot ==
Set against the bustling backdrop of a train station, with its thundering engines and the coordinated chaos of the roundhouse, dispatcher's office, and switch-room, unfolds a love story between Joe Foley, a young train engineer, and Norah Kelly, an Irish waitress at the Junction Cafe.

== Cast ==
- Jack Dougherty as Joseph Foley
- Blanche Mehaffey as Nora Kelly
- Tom O'Brien as Sandy McPherson
- Charles K. French as Jim Reed
- William Steel as Blackie McPherson
- Harry Todd as Dad Hamilton
- Madge Hunt as Mrs. Foley
- Syd Saylor as The Tramp

== Bibliography ==
- Munden, Kenneth White. The American Film Institute Catalog of Motion Pictures Produced in the United States, Part 1. University of California Press, 1997. ISBN 978-0-520-20969-5.
