= Who's Who in Society =

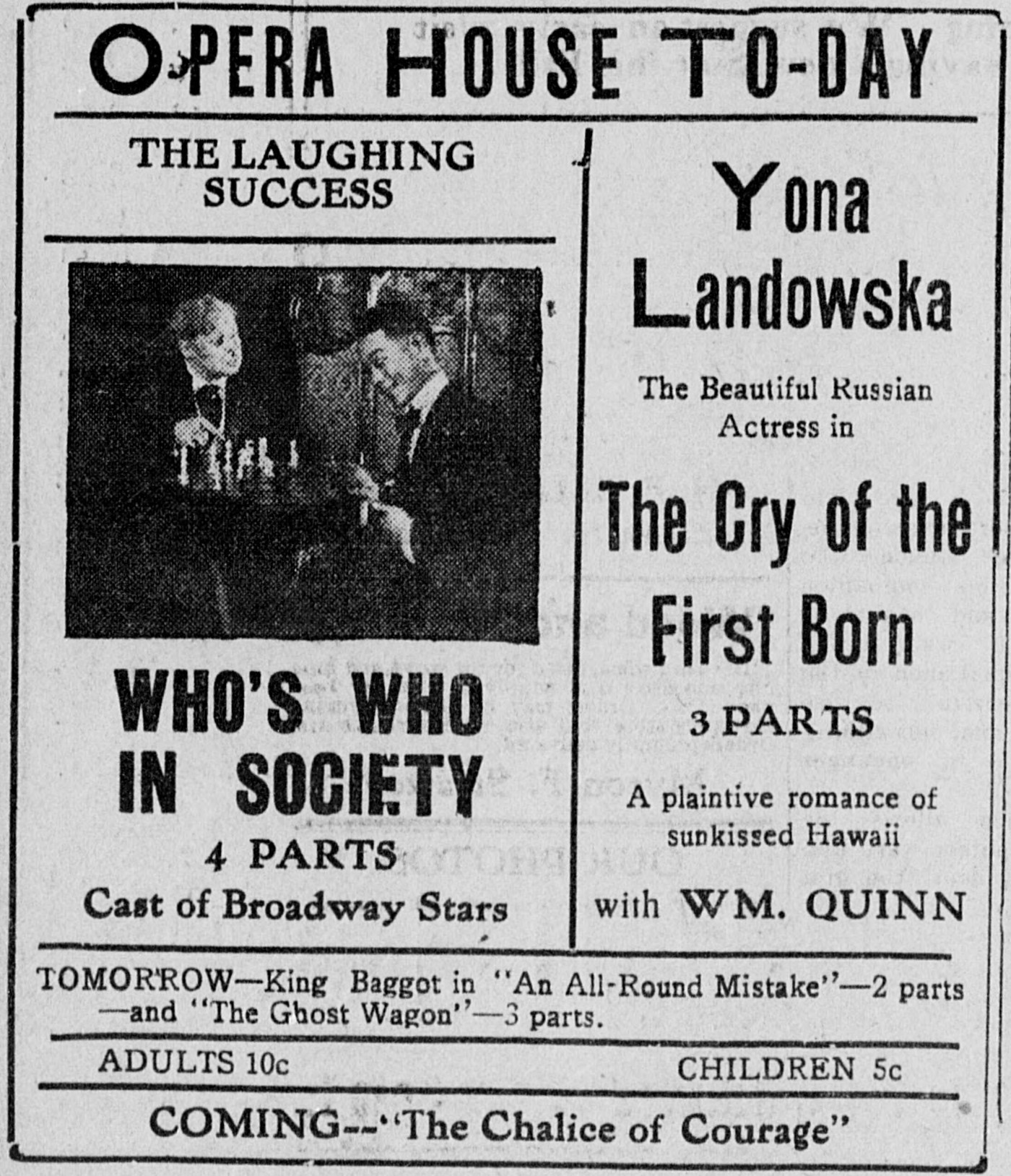
- Newspaper advertisement
- Directed by: George Fitzmaurice
- Written by: George Fitzmaurice
- Produced by: George Kleine
- Starring: Dan Moyles; Kate Sergeantson; Della Connor
- Production company: George Kleine Productions
- Distributed by: Kleine-Edison Feature Services
- Release date: May 10, 1915
- Running time: 4 reels
- Country: United States
- Languages: Silent; English intertitles

Who's Who in Society is a 1915 American silent comedy film directed by George Fitzmaurice and starring Dan Moyles, Kate Sergeantson, and Della Connor.

== Cast ==
- Dan Moyles as Patrick O'Brien
- Kate Sergeantson as Mrs. O'Brien
- Della Connor as Mary Ellen O'Brien
- William H. Power as The detective
- Edward Lester as Lord Algy

== Bibliography ==
- Jay Robert Nash, Robert Connelly & Stanley Ralph Ross. Motion Picture Guide Silent Film 1910-1936. Cinebooks, 1988.
