= Half-A-Dollar-Bill =

1924 film by W. S. Van Dyke

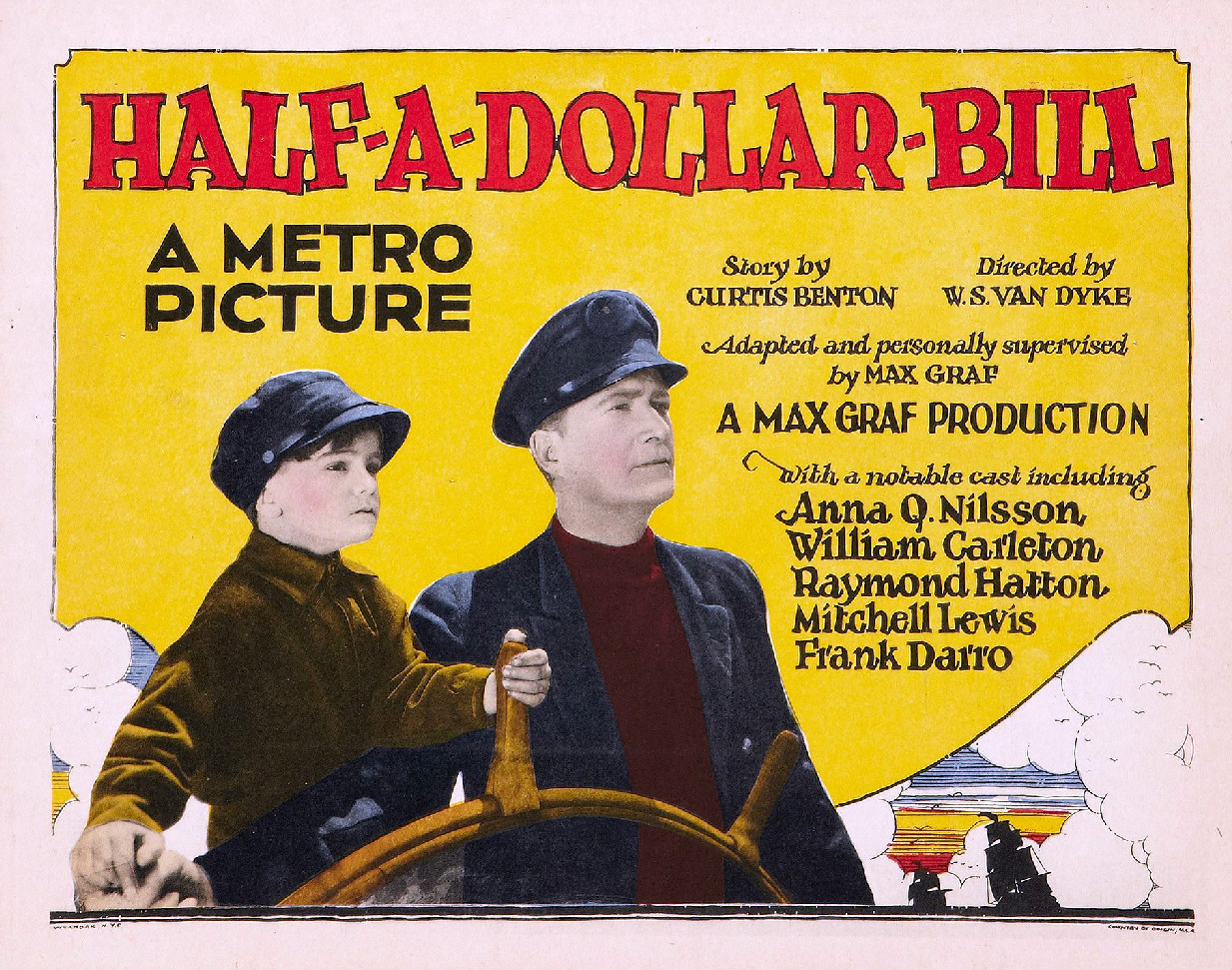
- Lobby card
- Directed by: W. S. Van Dyke
- Written by: Max Graf (adaptation); Alfred A. Cohn (intertitles)
- Story by: Curtis Benton
- Produced by: Max Graf
- Starring: Anna Q. Nilsson
- Cinematography: Andre Barlatier French Wikipedia
- Distributed by: Metro Pictures
- Release date: January 14, 1924
- Running time: 60 minutes
- Country: United States
- Language: Silent (English intertitles)

Half-A-Dollar-Bill is a surviving 1924 American silent drama film directed by W. S. Van Dyke and starring Anna Q. Nilsson. It was produced by an independent company and released through Metro Pictures.

== Plot ==
As described in a film magazine review, Captain Duncan McTeague, ashore in Southport, finds a deserted baby boy with a note and half of a dollar bill pinned to its clothing. The note states that the mother hopes some day to return and identify the child with the other half of the dollar bill. McTeague raises the child. When he is four years old, the captain discharges his mate Martin Webber, who seeks revenge by kidnapping the boy. A woman turns up who proves to be the missing mother. Webber is killed and the mother and Captain McTeague are united.

== Cast ==
- Anna Q. Nilsson as The Stranger, Mrs. Webber
- William P. Carleton as Captain Duncan McTeague
- Raymond Hatton as Noodles, the cook
- Mitchell Lewis as Papeete Joe
- George MacQuarrie as Martin Webber
- Frankie Darro as Half-A-Dollar-Bill
- Rosa Gore as Gossip

== Preservation ==
A copy of Half-A-Dollar-Bill was preserved by MGM labs and a print is held by the Cinematheque Royale de Belgique.
