= Sailor Izzy Murphy =

1927 film

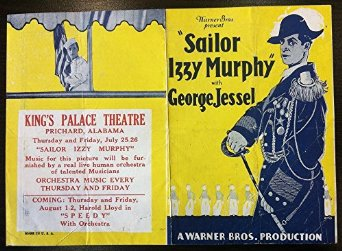
- Film herald
- Directed by: Henry Lehrman
- Screenplay by: Edward T. Lowe, Jr.
- Story by: Henry Lehrman; Edward T. Lowe, Jr.
- Produced by: Frank Shaw
- Starring: George Jessel; Audrey Ferris; Warner Oland; John Miljan
- Cinematography: Frank Kesson
- Production company: Warner Bros.
- Distributed by: Warner Bros.
- Release date: October 8, 1927 (US); (limited release)
- Running time: 70 minutes
- Country: United States
- Languages: Sound (Synchronized) (English Intertitles)

Sailor Izzy Murphy is a 1927 American synchronized sound comedy-drama film released from Warner Bros. Pictures starring George Jessel, Audrey Ferris, Warner Oland and John Milijan. While the film has no audible dialog, it was released with a synchronized musical score with sound effects using the Vitaphone sound-on-disc process. The film was a follow-up to a previous film starring Jessel titled Private Izzy Murphy. The film premiered on October 8, 1927, at the Warners' Theater, two days after the premiere of The Jazz Singer, the first talking film (part-talkie) starring Al Jolson.

== Plot ==
Izzy Goldberg, a young and ambitious perfume vendor, hopes to sell a new formula, "Dream of Love," to the wealthy perfume merchant Monsieur Jules de Gondelaurier. The perfume bottles are adorned with a beautiful girl's image—unknown to Izzy at first, but soon revealed to be Marie, Jules’ own daughter.

When Jules sees the picture, he angrily rejects Izzy's offer. Furious, Izzy and his partner Jake decide to sue for heavy damages. Seeking to serve papers, they learn Jules is aboard his grand yacht, the Esmeralda, preparing to sail with Marie for a long cruise due to mysterious death threats.

The menacing letters come from Orchid Joe, an escaped lunatic obsessed with avenging the destruction of rare flowers used in Jules’ perfumes. Orchid Joe bribes the yacht's crew to abandon ship and replaces them with a band of fellow asylum escapees.

Denied boarding, Izzy cleverly impersonates a fellow lunatic, "Muscle Bound Murphy," and wins the captain's trust, gaining entrance with Jake. Jules and Marie, now aware of the lunatic crew, welcome Izzy's help.

When the captain orders Izzy to kill Jules, Izzy feigns enthusiasm, playing along to protect his friends. He enlists Jake to impersonate Jules in a staged assassination attempt—firing blanks and knocking Jake overboard. Though temporarily fooled, Orchid Joe soon exposes the trick and captures Izzy, Marie, and Jules, preparing them for execution.

At that moment, Cecile, a friend of Marie's, arrives on her yacht. Forced to join in a lively dance party aboard Esmeralda to mask the chaos, Izzy manages to send a secret note for help. A rescue party arrives, capturing the lunatic crew.

Orchid Joe locks himself with Izzy and Marie in the engine room, planning to blow up the ship. Forced to shovel coal at gunpoint, Izzy outsmarts and overpowers Joe, saving everyone.

Grateful, Monsieur Jules gladly gives permission for Izzy to marry Marie, who has won Izzy's heart.

== Cast ==
- George Jessel as Izzy Goldberg
- Audrey Ferris as Marie
- Warner Oland as Monsieur Jules de Gondelaurier
- John Miljan as Orchid Joe
- Otto Lederer as Jake
- Theodore Lorch as the first mate
- Clara Horton as Cecile

== Preservation ==
No known film element, including the Vitaphone Sound-on-disc soundtrack, are known to exist, meaning it is currently a lost film.

== See also ==
- List of early sound feature films (1926–1929)
- List of early Warner Bros. sound and talking features
