= Curtis Benton =

American actor and screenwriter

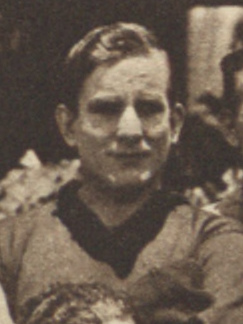
- Benton in 1916
- Born: Horatio Curtis Benton; August 26, 1885; Toledo, Ohio, USA
- Died: September 14, 1938 (aged 53); Los Angeles, California, USA
- Occupations: actor, Boxer
- Years active: 1915–1917, 1931–1937 (actor); 1922–1929 (writer)

Horatio Curtis Benton (August 26, 1885 – September 14, 1938) was an American actor and screenwriter for silent films and early talkies.

== Biography ==
Born in Toledo, Ohio, Benton, attended Vanderbilt University and embarked upon a stage career in 1903, appearing with Robert Hilliard in A Fool There Was, and two seasons with Cohan and Harris' company where he played parts in The Fortune Hunter, Broadway Jones, and others. His film career included supporting roles in The Pursuit Eternal (1915), Conscience (1915) (which he also wrote), 20,000 Leagues Under the Sea (1916), Jealousy (1916), The Siren (1917), Fireman, Save My Child (1932) and Kid Galahad (1937). His writing credits include The Uninvited Guest (1924), It Is the Law (1924), and The Phantom Bullet (1926). In his later years he was a boxing announcer at the Hollywood Stadium. He died in Hollywood in 1938 after a six-months illness.

== Filmography ==
Year	Title	Role	Actor	Writer	Note
1915	The Story the Silk Hats Told	—N/a	No	Yes	Short film
1915	Everygirl	Love	Yes	No	Short film
1915	The Mystery of the Man Who Slept	Jack Christie	Yes	No	Short film
1915	The Honor of the Ormsbys	Varden	Yes	No	Short film
1915	The Girl Who Had a Soul	undetermined role	Yes	No	Short film
1915	A Witch of Salem Town	The Governor	Yes	No	Short film
1915	The Pursuit Eternal	Stanlon Leeds	Yes	No	Short film
1915	Conscience	undetermined role	Yes	Yes	
1915	The Wrong Label	Detective Farnum	Yes	No	Short film
1915	Not a Lamb Shall Stray	The Husband	Yes	No	Short film
1915	Capital Punishment		No	Yes	Short film
1916	Madame Cubist	Tom Decker	Yes	No	
1916	The Strength of the Weak	Tom Dare	Yes	No	
1916	Scorched Wings	Robert Blair	Yes	No	Short film
1916	The Girl Who Feared Daylight	Bruce Hilton	Yes	No	Short film
1916	Just Kitty	George Jennings	Yes	No	Short film
1916	The Devil's Image	James Mortimer	Yes	No	Short film
1916	A Stranger in His Own Home	Percival Green	Yes	No	Short film
1916	20,000 Leagues Under the Sea	Ned Land	Yes	No	
1916	Jealousy	Roland Carney	Yes	No	
1917	The Siren	undetermined role	Yes	No	
1922	The Fast Freight	—N/a	No	Yes	
1923	Mighty Lak' a Rose	—N/a	No	Yes	
1924	Half-A-Dollar-Bill	—N/a	No	Yes	
1924	The Uninvited Guest	—N/a	No	Yes	
1924	It Is the Law	—N/a	No	Yes	
1925	Sporting Life	—N/a	No	Yes	
1926	The Phantom Bullet	—N/a	No	Yes	
1926	The Runaway Express	—N/a	No	Yes	
1927	Down the Stretch	—N/a	No	Yes	
1927	The Sunset Derby	—N/a	No	Yes	
1927	The Life of Riley	—N/a	No	Yes	
1927	Clancy's Kosher Wedding	—N/a	No	Yes	
1928	Bachelor's Paradise	—N/a	No	Yes	
1928	United States Smith	—N/a	No	Yes	
1928	A Dumb Waiter	—N/a	No	Yes	Short film
1928	Freedom of the Press	—N/a	No	Uncredited	
1928	A Jim Jam Janitor	—N/a	No	Yes	Short film
1929	Clunked on the Corner	—N/a	No	Yes	Short film
1929	A Close Shave	—N/a	No	Yes	Short film
1931	Slide, Speedy, Slide	Radio Announcer	Yes	No	Short film, uncredited
1931	The Pottsville Palooka	Radio Announcer	Yes	No	Short film, uncredited
1931	Local Boy Makes Good	Announcer at Track Meet	Yes	No	uncredited
1932	Fireman, Save My Child!	Radio Announcer	Yes	No	
1932	High Speed	Car Racing Announcer	Yes	No	uncredited
1932	The Animal Kingdom	Radio Announcer	Yes	No	voice role, uncredited
1933	Thru Thin and Thicket, or Who's Zoo in Africa	Radio Announcer	Yes	No	Short film
1934	Manhattan Melodrama	Announcer	Yes	No	uncredited
1935	Don't Bet on Blondes	Announcer of Caprice Race	Yes	No	uncredited
1936	It Had to Happen	Radio Announcer	Yes	No	uncredited
1936	Cain and Mabel	Fight Radio Announcer	Yes	No	uncredited
1936	Three Men on a Horse	Racetrack Announcer	Yes	No	voice role, uncredited
1937	Kid Galahad	Announcer	Yes	No	uncredited, final film role
