= Back Home and Broke =

1922 film

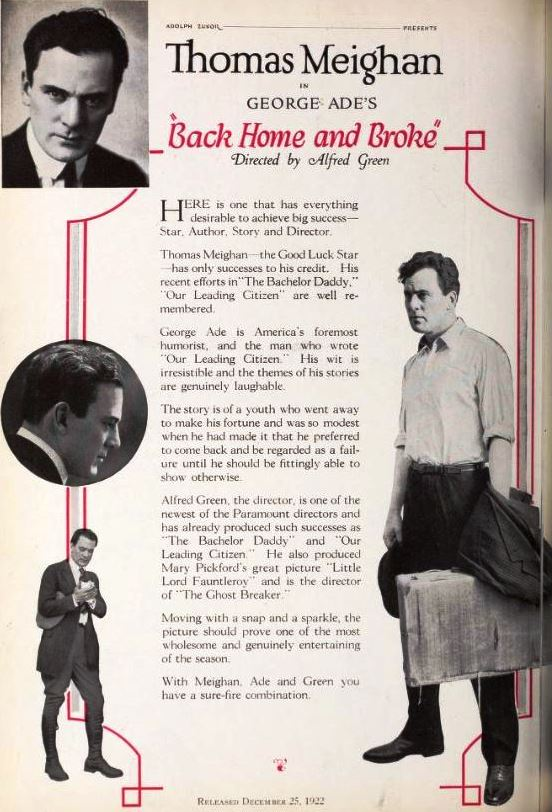
- Trade advertisement
- Directed by: Alfred E. Green
- Screenplay by: George Ade; J. Clarkson Miller
- Produced by: Adolph Zukor
- Starring: Thomas Meighan; Lila Lee; Frederick Burton; Cyril Ring
- Cinematography: Henry Cronjager
- Production company: Famous Players–Lasky Corporation
- Distributed by: Paramount Pictures
- Release date: December 24, 1922
- Running time: 80 minutes
- Country: United States
- Language: Silent (English intertitles)

Back Home and Broke is a lost 1922 American silent comedy film directed by Alfred E. Green and written by George Ade and J. Clarkson Miller. The film stars Thomas Meighan, Lila Lee, Frederick Burton, Cyril Ring, Charles S. Abbe, Florence Dixon, and Gertrude Quinlan. The film was released on December 24, 1922, by Paramount Pictures.

== Plot ==
As described in a film magazine, when Tom Redding's father dies, it transpires that, instead of being one of the wealthiest citizens of the Town of Bradford, he left little except some debts, having speculated wildly. Tom and his mother are compelled to leave their old home and move into a small house. Even the factory his father owned falls into creditors' hands and Olivia Hornby, Tom's sweetheart, discards him. Only Mary Thorne, his father's former secretary, remains faithful to Tom and his mother. As a last resource, Tom decides to go west to try and develop an oil well that Ton's father had sunk money into. Eventually he strikes oil. He meets his old college chum Billy Andrews who suggests that Tom return to Bradford apparently broke and thus discover who his true friends are. Their plot is developed satisfactory. Billy, posing as the representative of the millionaire Keene, buys up practically all the property in town, including the bank, newspaper, and the factory. Tom, poorly dressed, is coldly received by all save Mary, who even offers her savings to back him in a new venture. Then Billy announces that Keene will be arriving, and the people of the town turn out to welcome him. They are very surprised when the "Keene" turns out to be the despised Tom Redding. Tom gives a big dinner to his former detractors and, instead of taking revenge, announces that he will allow them to continue in control of his investments save the factory, which again displays the sign "Redding and Son." He and Mary are united.

== Cast ==
- Thomas Meighan as Tom Redding
- Lila Lee as Mary Thorne
- Frederick Burton as Otis Grimley
- Cyril Ring as Eustace Grimley
- Charles S. Abbe as H.H. Hornby
- Florence Dixon as Olivia Hornby
- Gertrude Quinlan as Aggie Twaddle
- Richard Carlyle as John Thorne
- Maude Turner Gordon as Mrs. Redding
- Larry Wheat as Billy Andrews
- Ned Burton as Horace Beemer
- James Marlowe as Policeman
- Eddie Borden as Collector
