= Ellen Cassidy =

American actress (1888–1960)

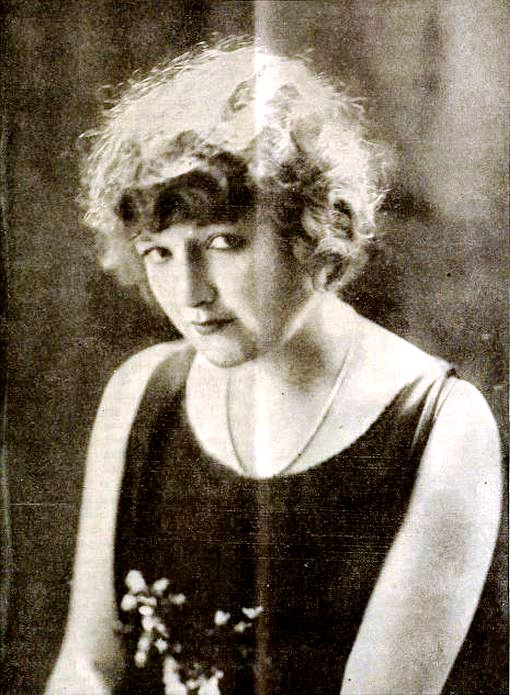
Ellen Cassidy in 1919.

Ellen "Ella" Louise Eastburn, also known by her married name Ellen Cassidy, (September 30, 1888 – April 19, 1960) was an American actress of stage and screen. She began her career performing on Broadway in the Ziegfeld Follies under the stage name Ellen Burford. She used this name briefly when transitioning into work as a leading silent film actress in 1917 with the King Bee Film Corporation, but then reverted to using her married name or its alternative spelling Ellen Cassity. Under her married name she made many silent films from 1918 to 1923. She also starred as Helen of Troy in the 1917–1918 Broadway musical revue Words and Music.

== Life and career ==
The daughter of Benjamin E. Eastburn and his wife Kate M. Cleary, Ella Louise Eastburn was born on September 30, 1888, in Jackson, Tennessee. She was raised in Louisville, Kentucky where the Cleary family was socially prominent. There she was educated at a Catholic school attached to a convent. On October 24, 1905, she married Benjamin R. Cassidy (later spelled Cassity) in Jeffersonville, Indiana. Their son, Burford Lawrence Cassity, was born in Louisville on May 14, 1907.

Against the wishes of her parents, Ella abandoned her family and pursued a career as a stage actress using the stage name Ellen Burford when she was 24 years old. She went to New York City where she worked as a chorus girl in the Ziegfeld Follies in the 1910s. When she made her film debut in a minor role as a society girl in The Kiss (1916) it was under her married name Ellen Cassidy. In 1917 she signed a year-long film contract with Billy West's King Bee Film Corporation (KBFC). As Ellen Burford she starred in the KBFC silent short films The Candy Kid (1917), The Chief Cook (1917), The Slave (1917), and the The Fly Cop (1917).

After this, she resumed performing under the name Ellen Cassidy (or Cassity) both in film and on stage. She played Helen of Troy in Raymond Hitchcock's musical Words and Music which ran on Broadway at the Fulton Theatre in 1917–1918. Her last film was Dark Secrets (1923).

Ellen Cassity died in Los Angeles on April 19, 1960.

== Filmography ==
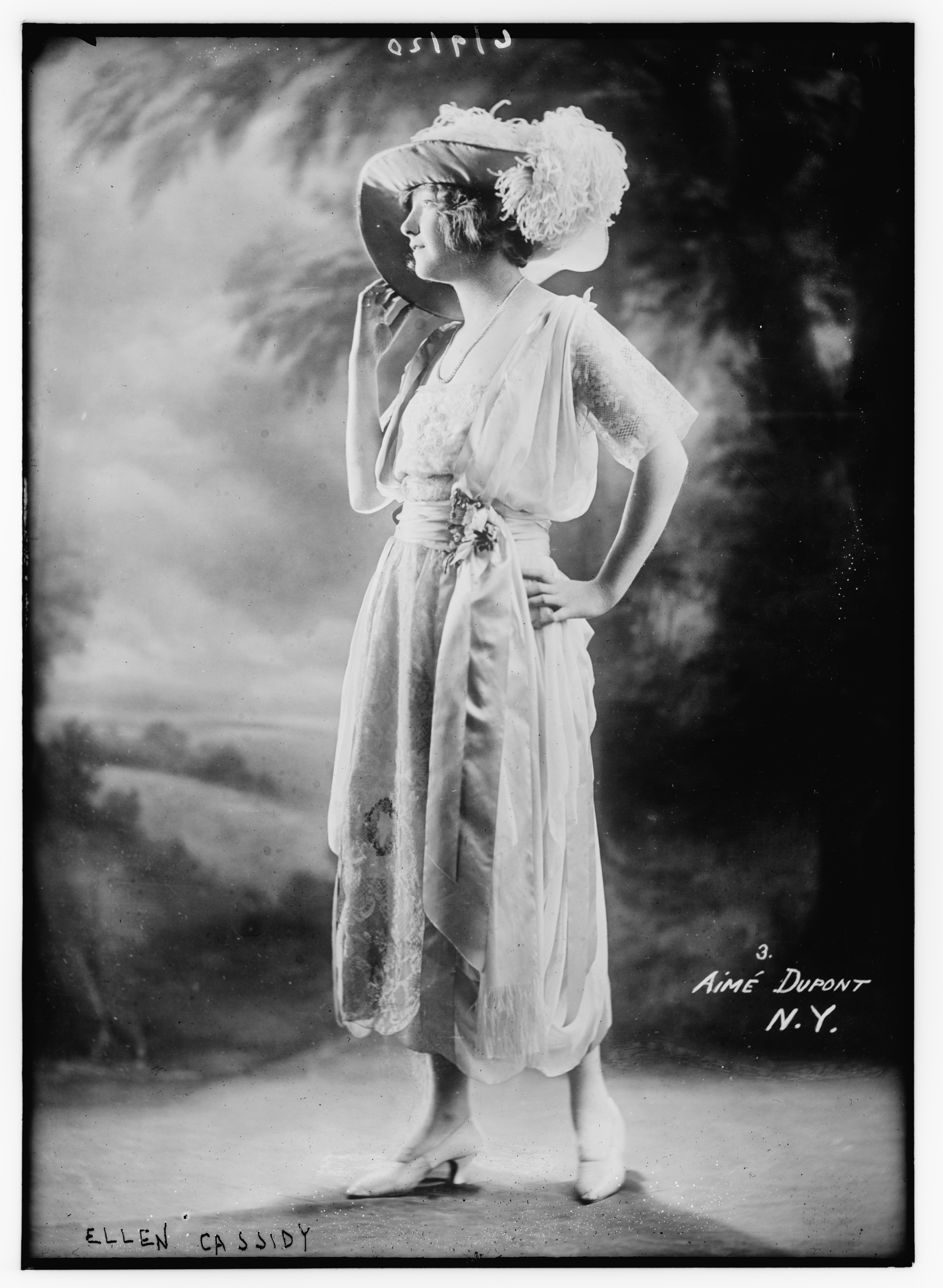
Ellen Cassidy

- The Kiss (1916) as Society Girl (credited as Ellen Cassidy)
- The Voice of Destiny (1918) as Eleanor Lee (credited as Ellen Cassity)
- Marriages Are Made (1918) as Doris Kemp (credited as Ellen Cassidy)
- Milady o' the Beanstalk (1918) Dora Tompkins (credited as Ellen Cassity)
- The Other Man's Wife (1919) as Mrs. Fred Hartley (credited as Ellen Cassidy)
- Love, Honor and — ? (1919) as Constance Elliot (credited as Ellen Cassidy)
- Through the Toils (1919) as Rhona Allerton (credited as Ellen Cassity)
- Checkers (1919) as Alva Romaine (credited as Ellen Cassity)
- The Vice of Fools (1920) as Diana Spaulding (credited as Ellen Cassity)
- Broadway and Home (1920) as Laura Greer (credited as Ellen Cassidy)
- Passers By (1920) as Beatrice Dainton (as Ellen Cassity)
- The Highest Bidder (1921) as Fanny de Witt (credited as Ellen Cassity)
- Room and Board (1921) as Leila (credited as Ellen Cassidy)
- The Miracle of Manhattan (1921) as Stella Warren (credited as Ellen Cassity)
- Poor, Dear Margaret Kirby (1921) as Lucille Yardsley (credited as Ellen Cassidy)
- Shackles of Gold (1922) as Elsie Chandler (credited as Ellen Cassity)
- Dark Secrets (1923) as Mildred Rice (credited as Ellen Cassidy)
