= Walter Archer Frost =

American writer

Walter Archer Frost (December 18, 1875 – March 10, 1964) was an American writer of plays and stories. He served in the U.S. Army. He authored the story the film The Siren (1917 film) was based on. He also wrote the 1925 play Cape Smoke. He also wrote the play the 1929 film Black Magic (1929 film) was based on.

In 1909 he was published in Overland Monthly. In 1912 he wrote for Harper's Bazar.

Frost was born in Amenia, New York. He was part of the Harvard class of 1901. He received an LLB from the University of Wisconsin in 1904. He married SusanWinifred McCurdy. He died in Martinsburg, West Virginia.

School principal, lecturer, and writer Simeon Taylor Frost was his father. He had a twin brother.

The plot of his book The Man Between includes a South African "witch doctor" who casts a curse that affects an American and some Englishmen.

After a career change from law he became an associate editor of Munsey Company's publication The Cavalier (periodical) in New York City and lived at the Judson Hotel.

He was married in 1905. A marriage announcement states he was from Neenah, Wisconsin.

He also worked at Good Housekeeping, People's Magazine, and Munsey's Magazine.

He served as a captain in the Quartermaster Corps.

Frost died at the Newton Baker Veterans Hospital in Martinsburg, West Virginia on March 10, 1964.

== Bibliography ==
- The Man Between (book) (1913), illustrated by Howard McCormick
- Strange Company (1937), a play in 3-acts
- Singapore, a play in 3-acts
- "Half a Man" (1950), published in the St. Nicholas Anthology
- No Questions Asked
- "The Admirable Crimes of Captain Clavering" (1926), a series of short stories published in Flynn's.
