= The Greater Claim =

1921 film by Wesley Ruggles

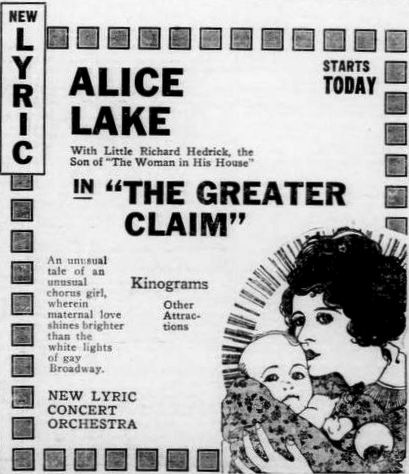
- Newspaper advertisement
- Directed by: Wesley Ruggles
- Starring: Alice Lake; Jack Dougherty
- Cinematography: Arthur Reeves
- Distributed by: Metro Pictures
- Release date: January 21, 1921 (U.S.)
- Running time: 6 reels
- Country: United States
- Language: Silent (English intertitles)

The Greater Claim is a 1921 American silent drama film directed by Wesley Ruggles and starring Alice Lake and Jack Dougherty. It was produced and distributed by the Metro Pictures Company.

An incomplete print is preserved in the Library of Congress collection, Packard Campus for Audio-Visual Conservation.

== Cast ==
- Alice Lake as Mary Smith
- Jack Dougherty as Richard Everard, Charlie
- Edward Cecil as Abe Dietz
- De Witt Jennings as Richard Everard Sr.
- Florence Gilbert as Gwendolyn
- Lenore Lynard as Rosie
