= The Road of Ambition =

1920 American silent film

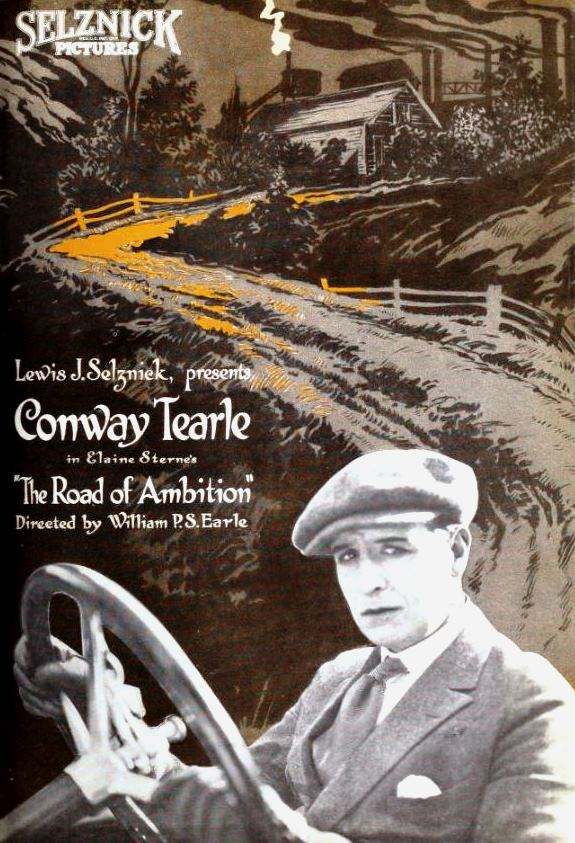
- Directed by: William P.S. Earle
- Written by: Lewis Allen Browne; Elaine S. Carrington
- Produced by: Lewis J. Selznick
- Starring: Conway Tearle; Florence Dixon; Gladden James
- Cinematography: William Whener
- Production company: Selznick Pictures
- Distributed by: Selznick Pictures
- Release date: March 20, 1922
- Running time: 60 minutes
- Country: United States
- Languages: Silent; English intertitles

The Road of Ambition is a 1920 American silent drama film directed by William P.S. Earle and starring Conway Tearle, Florence Dixon and Gladden James.

== Plot ==
Bill Matthews, foreman for Bethel Steel, works hard to perfect a means for the elimination of waste in steel manufacture. Philip Colt, inheritor of the steel mill, is in love with Daphne Van Steer, whose father is in financial straits. One day, visiting the mill with Philip, Daphne witnesses Bill thrash an insolent workman, and is impressed with his strength though she then snubs him. Bill soon perfects his invention, and coming into great wealth, resolves to become Daphne's social equal by employing socialite May Larrabee to coach him. May schemes to win Bill and his money for herself; however, Bill still wants to marry Daphne and help out her father, a plan to which Daphne finally agrees. Philip's continued pursuit of Daphne ends in a struggle from which Bill rescues her, after which Daphne finally realizes that she has come to really love Bill.

== Cast ==
- Conway Tearle as Bill Matthews
- Florence Dixon as Daphne Van Steer
- Gladden James as Philip Colt
- Florence Billings as May Larrabee
- Arthur Housman as Monty Newcomb
- Tom Brooke as Mr. Benson
- Tom McGuire as Old Mack
- Adolph Milar as Ole Olson

== Bibliography ==
- George A. Katchmer. Eighty Silent Film Stars: Biographies and Filmographies of the Obscure to the Well Known. McFarland, 1991.
