= The Siren (1917 film) =

1917 film directed by Roland West

- Directed by: Roland West
- Written by: Donald I. Buchanan (scenario)
- Story by: Walter Archer Frost
- Starring: Valeska Suratt
- Cinematography: Edward Wynard
- Distributed by: Fox Film Corporation
- Release date: July 1, 1917
- Running time: 5 reels
- Country: United States
- Languages: Silent; English intertitles

The Siren is a 1917 American silent Western film directed by Roland West, in one of his earlier efforts, and starred Valeska Surratt. The Siren is now considered lost.

== Cast ==
- Valeska Suratt as Cherry Millard
- Clifford Bruce as Derrick McClade
- Robert Clugston as Burt Hall
- Isabel Rea as Rose Langdon
- Cesare Gravina as Her Father
- Armand Kalisz as Armand
- Rica Scott as Cherry's Maid
- Curtis Benton

== See also ==
- List of lost silent films (1915–19)
