= Words and Music (Hitchcock and Goetz) =

Words and Music is a musical revue in two acts and 10 scenes with a book by Raymond Hitchcock. The musical contained some original music and lyrics by E. Ray Goetz, but also contained music by Ludwig van Beethoven and lyrics by William Shakespeare. It opened on Broadway at the Fulton Theatre on Christmas Eve of 1917. It ran for 24 performances; closing on January 12, 1918.

== Cast ==
- Edna Aug as a Commuteress
- Elizabeth Brice as Mrs. Billings F. Cooings
- Richard Carle as Theatrical Manager, an Electrician, a Poet, and a Starter
- Ellen Cassidy as Helen of Troy
- Mildred Colby as Eve
- Wellington Cross as a Yogi, a Husband, a Lieutenant, and a Toy Soldier
- Marion Davies as Gaby Delsys, a Geisha, and a French Doll
- Lillian Davis as Lucretia Borgia
- Gordon Dooley as Whirlwind Inbad
- Ray Dooley as Gazzolean Whirlwind
- William Dooley as Al Radish Whirlwind
- Flo Hart as Cora Pearl
- Ben Hendricks as a Famous Composer
- Dorothy Herman as Katie
- Evelyn Kerner as Lola Montez
- Dorothy Koffee as Madamella Pompadour
- Gladys Logan as a Commuter
- Frank Mayne as a Distinguished Playwright
- Evelyn Monte as Delilah
- Anna May Seymour as a Stenographer and an Usheress
- Harry Seymour as The Yogi's Assistant
- Harry Tanner as a Plain Clothes Man
- Edythe Whitney as Circe
- Jay Wilson as a Gambler
