= Passers By (1920 film) =

1920 film

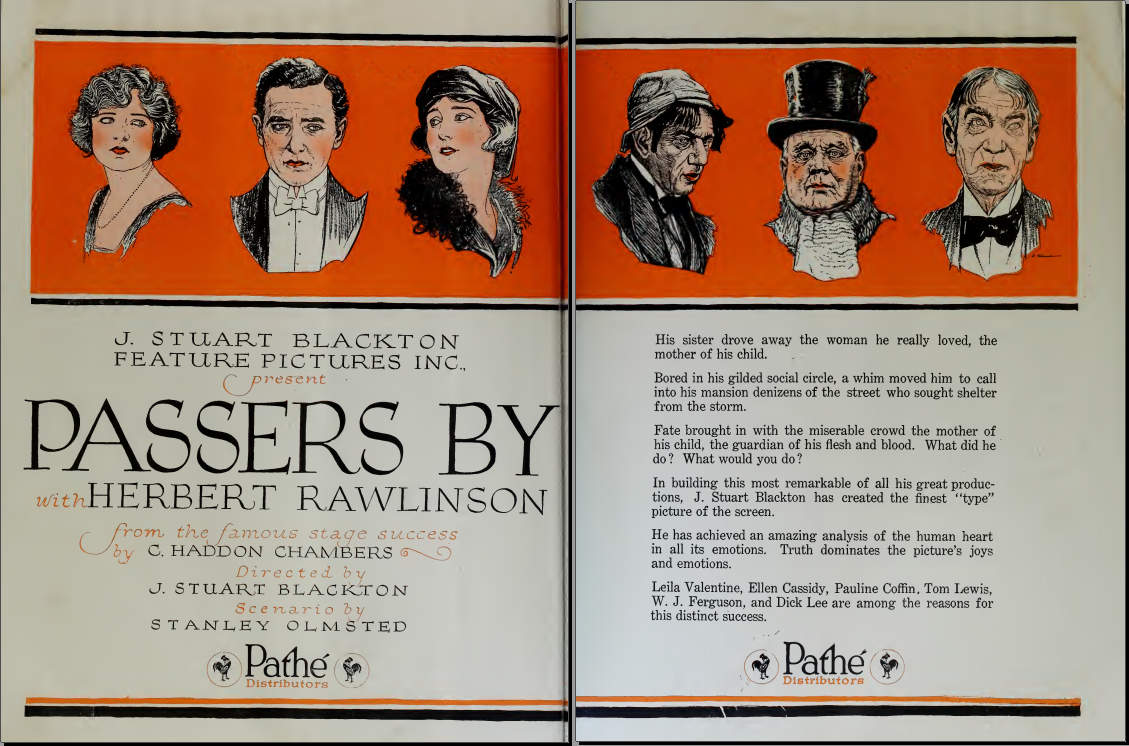
- Directed by: J. Stuart Blackton
- Written by: Stanley Olmstead
- Based on: Passers By by C. Haddon Chambers
- Produced by: J. Stuart Blackton
- Starring: Herbert Rawlinson; Leila Valentine; Ellen Cassity
- Cinematography: William S. Adams
- Production company: J. Stuart Blackton Feature Pictures
- Distributed by: Pathé Exchange
- Release date: June 20, 1920
- Running time: 60 minutes
- Country: United States
- Languages: Silent; English intertitles

Passers By is a 1920 American silent romantic drama film directed by J. Stuart Blackton and starring Herbert Rawlinson, Leila Valentine and Ellen Cassity. It was based on a 1911 West End play of the same title by C. Haddon Chambers, which had previously been made into the 1916 film Passers By.

== Plot ==
In England a young man falls in love with the governess to his stepsister's children. When she discovers about the potential relationship she does her best to sabotage it due to her snobbish attitudes.

== Cast ==
- Herbert Rawlinson as Peter Waverton
- Leila Valentine as Margaret Summers
- Ellen Cassity as Beatrice Dainton
- Pauline Coffyn as Lady Hurley
- William J. Ferguson as Pine, the Butler
- Tom Lewis as Nighty
- Dick Lee as Burns
- Charles Stuart Blackton as Little Peter

== Bibliography ==
- Connelly, Robert B. The Silents: Silent Feature Films, 1910-36, Volume 40, Issue 2. December Press, 1998.
- Goble, Alan. The Complete Index to Literary Sources in Film. Walter de Gruyter, 1999.
