= Captain Swift (play) =

1888 play by C. Haddon Chambers

- Written by: C. Haddon Chambers
- Characters: Mr Seabrook; Harry Seabrook (his son); George Gardner (from Queensland); Mr Wilding/Captain Swift; Marshall (Seabrook's butler); Bates (Seabrook's footman); Ryan (a Queensland detective); Mrs Seabrook; Mabel Seabrook (her daughter); Stella Darbisher (her niece); Lady Salunton (her sister)
- Original language: English
- Genre: drama

Premiere
- Date premiered: 20 June 1888
- Place premiered: London

Captain Swift is an 1888 stage play by Australian author C. Haddon Chambers. It was turned into a 1920 film Captain Swift and adapted for radio. The play was one of the first plays by an Australian with Australian characters to achieve success overseas.

According to Chambers' biography "The only Chambers play with significant Australian colour, it is chiefly remembered for the phrase 'The long arm of coincidence has reached after me'. "

Historian Roger Neill wrote about the play, "At one level, it is a conventional drawing-room melodrama. At another, the arrival of the Australian bushranger is used by Chambers to puncture the narrow assumptions of polite English society at that time."

== Production history ==
The play was written over four months as a vehicle for Herbert Beerbohm Tree.

It made its debut in London in 1888 and was very successful. According to one writer, "the strength of the drama, the dexterity of the construction, the freshness of the treatment and the marked excellence of the dialogue won the enthusiastic approval of the audience, and moved the critics to exhaust their stock of superlatives."

The play was produced in New York starring Maurice Barrymore.

It was presented in Sydney in 1889.

The play was produced in Melbourne in 1924.

One critic called it "a stilted bit of dramatic rubbish."

== Premise ==
An Australian outlaw, Captain Swift, manages to escape to England where he lives under an assumed name, Wilding, and becomes a fixture in London's high society. He meets Gardiner, a wealthy squatter who was once held up by Swift, and a detective, Ryan, who has come to London to arrest the bushranger.

Stella Seabrook falls in love with Wilding. Her aunt, Mrs Seabrook, turns out to be the mother of the baby who became Swif/Widling. The butler, Marshall, recognises Wilding and betrays him to Ryan. Wilding commits suicide.

== Film adaptations ==
The play was turned into film versions in 1914 and 1920.

For the 1920 version see Captain Swift.

== 1932 radio adaptation ==
Wireless Weekly 18 Nov 1932

The play was adapted for radio by the ABC in 1932. It was one of the first plays dramatised by the ABC.

The production was adapted and produced by George D Parker and was popular enough to be repeated.

== 1950 and 1953 radio adaptations ==
The play was adapted for radio again by the ABC in April 1950, with a one-hour script adapted by Edmund Barclay.

The ABC recorded it again in 1953.
