= The Fast Freight =

1922 American comedy film

- Directed by: James Cruze
- Written by: Curtis Benton
- Produced by: Adolph Zukor; Jesse L. Lasky
- Starring: Fatty Arbuckle
- Distributed by: Paramount Pictures
- Release date: June 18, 1922
- Running time: 5 reels
- Country: United States
- Languages: Silent; English intertitles

The Fast Freight is a 1922 American comedy film starring Fatty Arbuckle. The film was not released in the US, due to Arbuckle's involvement in the Virginia Rappe scandal. The film is also known as Via Fast Freight, Handle with Care and Freight Prepaid.

== Cast ==
- Roscoe "Fatty" Arbuckle as Ras Berry
- Lila Lee as Elsie
- Nigel Barrie as John Hammond
- Herbert Standing as Peter Hammond
- Raymond Hatton

== Preservation ==
In February of 2021, The Fast Freight was cited by the National Film Preservation Board on their Lost U.S. Silent Feature Films list and is therefore presumed lost.

== See also ==
- List of American films of 1922
- Fatty Arbuckle filmography
