= Jack Dougherty (actor) =

American actor (1895–1938)

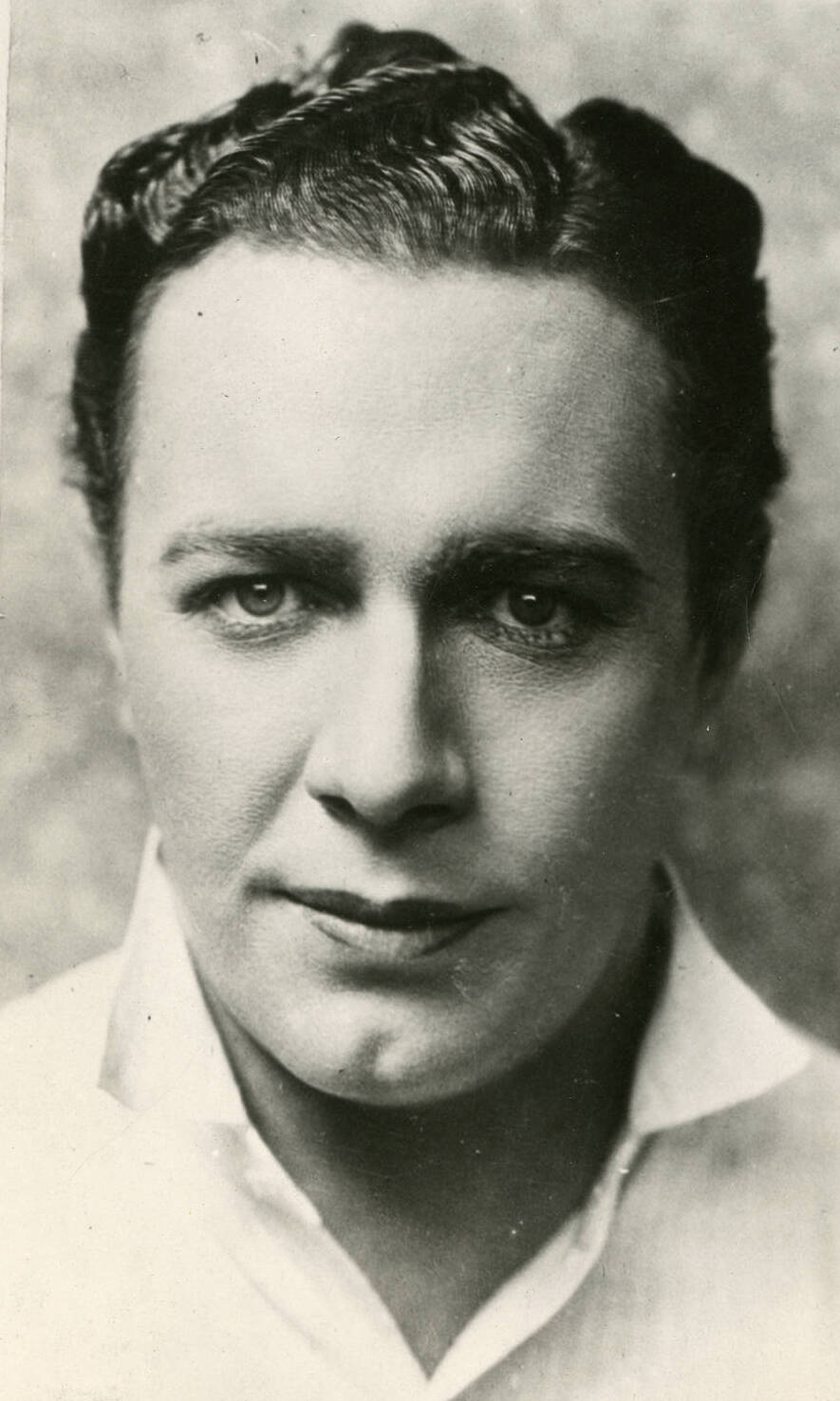
- Dougherty c. 1928
- Born: Virgil Ashley Dougherty; November 16, 1895; Bowling Green, Missouri, U.S.
- Died: May 16, 1938 (aged 42); Los Angeles, California, U.S.
- Occupation: Actor
- Spouses: Barbara La Marr (m. 1923; died 1926) Virginia Brown Faire (m. 1927; div. 1928)

Jack Dougherty (born November 16, 1895 – May 16, 1938 as Virgil Ashley Dougherty) was an American actor who appeared in B-movies in the 1910s, 1920s, and 1930s. He was married to actress Barbara La Marr at the time of her death.

== Biography ==
Jack was born in Bowling Green, Missouri, to Roy Dougherty and Julia Ach. The family relocated to Southern California when Jack was young. He began a career as an actor in Broadway musicals in the late 1910s. In 1920, after returning from serving in France during World War I, he was signed with Metro to play Alice Lake's leading man.

In 1923, Dougherty signed a five-year contract at Universal, and in the same year, married actress Barbara La Marr. The marriage was tumultuous, and multiple separations were noted in the press. The pair were still legally wed, however, La Marr died of tuberculosis in 1926 at the age of 29.

In 1927, Dougherty married his second wife, actress Virginia Brown Faire. The marriage did not last long—the pair parted ways in 1929, and she soon married director Duke Worne. In 1928, he and actress Lottie Pickford were assaulted by robbers outside of a cafe in East Los Angeles. Later that year, Dougherty was charged for assaulting another male guest at a party held by Pickford.

His legal foibles and troubles with alcohol led to diminishing roles on screen right as the silent era waned; he was no longer getting starring roles or gigs from major studios. After an attempted suicide in 1933, he committed suicide by carbon monoxide poisoning on May 16, 1938, in the Hollywood Hills; he reportedly left behind four suicide notes that blamed financial troubles for his ultimate fate. He was 42 years old.

== Partial filmography ==
- Neptune's Bride (1920)
- The Greater Claim (1921)
- Chain Lightning (1922)
- Second Hand Rose (1922)
- Impulse (1922)
- Money, Money, Money (1923)
- The Haunted Valley (1923)
- The Wheel of Fortune (1923)
- A Girl of the Limberlost (1924)
- The Iron Man (1924)
- The Meddler (1925)
- The Burning Trail (1925)
- The Fighting Ranger (1925)
- The Meddler (1925)
- The Scarlet Streak (1925)
- The Radio Detective (1926)
- The Runaway Express (1927)
- The Fire Fighters (1927)
- Down the Stretch (1927)
- Arizona Bound (1927)
- Special Delivery (1927)
- Lure of the Night Club (1927)
- The Trail of the Tiger (1927)
- Haunted Island (1928)
- Gypsy of the North (1928)
- Into No Man's Land (1928)
- The Vanishing West (1928)
- The Body Punch (1929)
- Afraid to Talk (1932)
- General Spanky (1936)
- Sinner Take All (1936)
- Yodelin' Kid from Pine Ridge (1937)
- It Can't Last Forever (1937)
- Charlie Chan on Broadway (1937)
- The Game That Kills (1937)
- Double Wedding (1937)
- No Time to Marry (1938)
- The Big Broadcast of 1938 (1938)
- One Wild Night (1938)
- The Main Event (1938)
