= The Other Man's Wife =

1919 film

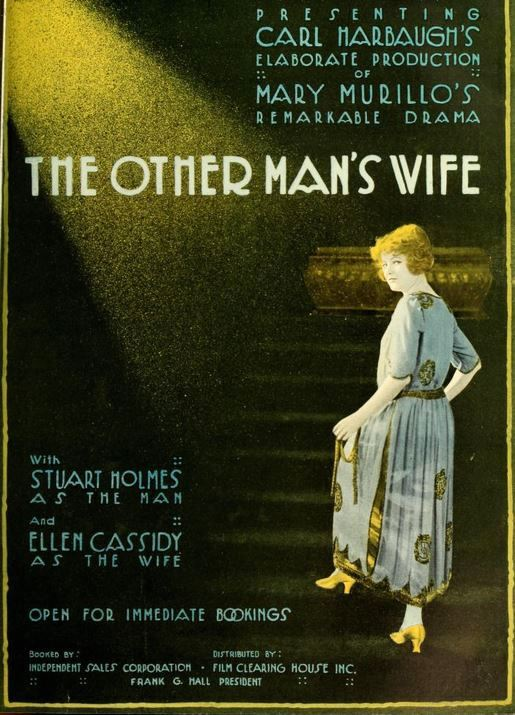
- Ad for film
- Directed by: Carl Harbaugh
- Written by: Mary Murillo
- Starring: Ellen Cassidy
- Cinematography: William Crolly
- Release date: June 8, 1919
- Running time: 60 minutes
- Country: United States
- Language: Silent (English intertitles)

The Other Man's Wife is a 1919 American silent drama film directed by Carl Harbaugh which, as discussed in its prologue, is dedicated to the part played by women at home during World War I. It was the film debut of George Jessel. The film is considered to be lost.

== Plot ==
As described in a film magazine, the wartime draft affects three families, one wealthy, one on the East Side, and the other a middle-class family. In the wealthy home a man leaves his butterfly wife and three children, in the middle class home a youth leaves his mother and sister, and in the East Side home a boy leaves his parents and three sisters, the men all marching off to training camp. While they are away, J. Douglas Kerr (Holmes) is the lounge lizard interloper who endeavors to win the affections of the wife of the wealthy Fred Hartley, stooping so low as to send a cablegram suggesting the death of the husband. While she is less of the butterfly than he supposes, she apparently succumbs to his attentions, and he believes he will obtain some money marrying her. But after the armistice ends the fighting, the men begin to come home to their families. Fred Hartley comes home to find his wife in Kerr's arms, where she is struggling to free herself, saying to Kerr that she was wise to his low tactics all along, but had to use a woman's weapons. In this tense scene Fred initially refuses to respond to his wife's embrace, but later matters logically work themselves out for a happy reunion of all families.

== Cast ==
- Ellen Cassidy as Mrs. Fred Hartley
- Stuart Holmes as J. Douglas Kerr
- Ned Hay as Fred Hartley
- Olive Trevor as Elsie Drummond
- Halbert Brown as Bruce Drummond
- Elizabeth Garrison as Mrs. Bruce Drummond (as Mrs. Garrison)
- Leslie Casey as Wilbur Drummond
- Regina Quinn as Betty Moore
- Laura Newman as Mrs. Moore
- Danny Sullivan as Jimmy Moore
- George Jessel as Davy Simon
- Evelyn Brent as Becky Simon
