= Florence Dixon =

American actress (1898-1986)

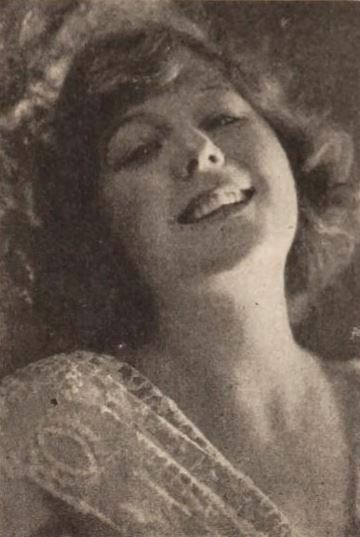
- Florence Dixon, from a 1921 publication
- Died: 1986; Santa Clara, California, U.S.
- Occupations: Actress, model
- Known for: "Coca-Cola Girl" (in 1920s advertisements)

Florence Dixon was an American model and actress in silent films. She was also "the Coca-Cola Girl" in print and display advertisements in the 1920s.

== Early life ==
Dixon was raised in Altoona, Pennsylvania.

== Career ==
Dixon modeled for artists and photographers, including James Montgomery Flagg, and modeled new fashions in newspapers. She was known as the "Coca-Cola Girl" after her image was used in a national advertising campaign for the soft drink. In 1920, she helped promote a collection of dolls made by French widows as a fundraiser for postwar relief.

Dixon's film credits included roles in Independence, B'Gosh (1918), The Lonesome Girl (1918), One Every Minute (1919), Never Say Quit (1919), Tough Luck Jones (1919), Captain Swift (1920), The Silent Barrier (1920), The Road of Ambition (1920), Hidden Charms (1921), Jimmy's Last Night Out (1921), The Supreme Passion (1921), The Stowaway (1921), Props (1921), Wild Women (1921), Anna Ascends (1922), Women Men Marry (1922), Back Home and Broke (1922), Wife in Name Only (1923), and It Is the Law (1924).
