= George Jessel (actor) =

American entertainer (1898–1981)

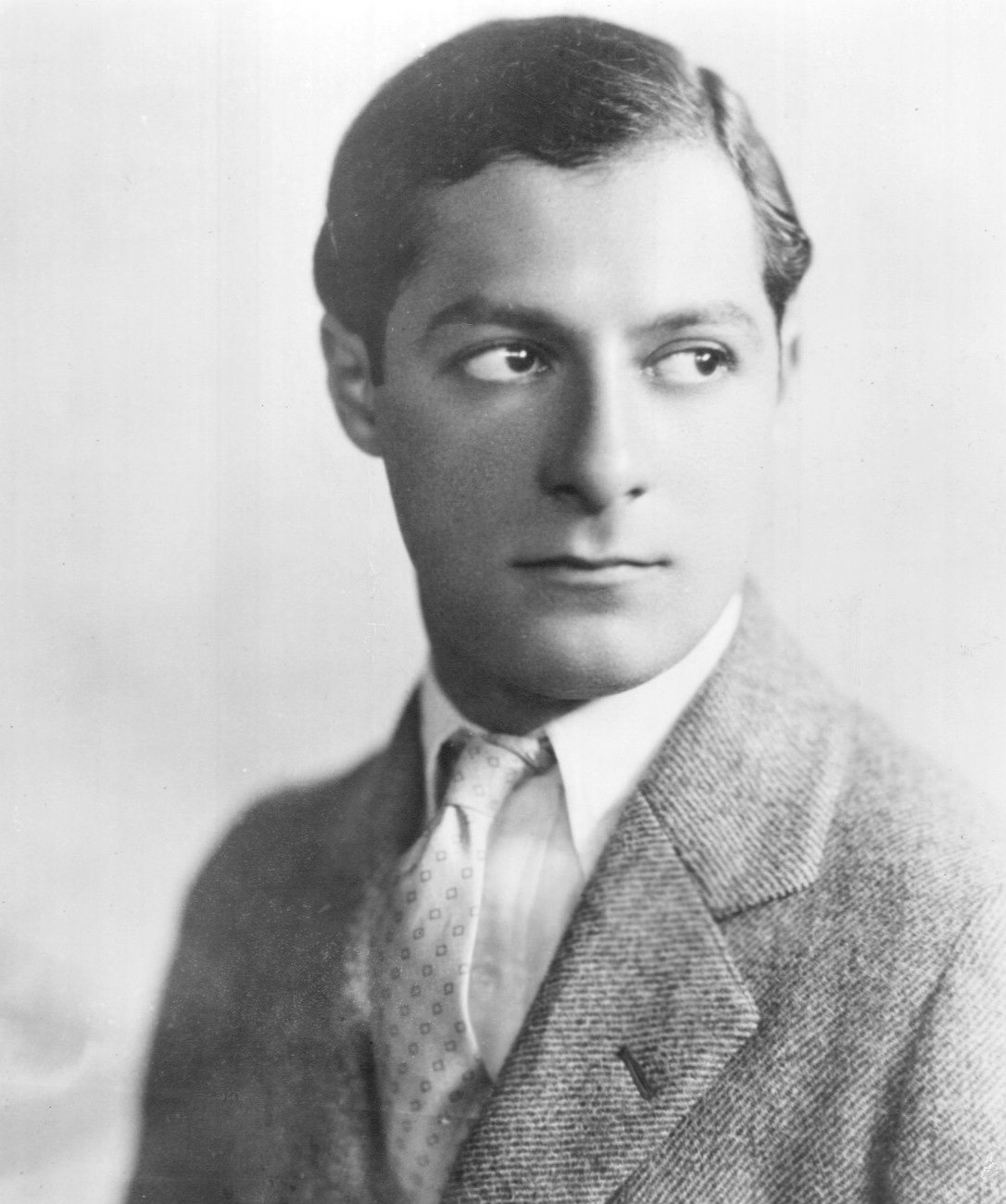
- Jessel c. 1926
- Born: George Albert Jessel; April 3, 1898; New York City, U.S.
- Died: May 23, 1981 (aged 83); Los Angeles, California, U.S.
- Resting place: Hillside Memorial Park Cemetery, Culver City, California, U.S.
- Other name: Georgie Jessel
- Years active: 1909–1981
- Spouses: Florence Courtney (m. 1923; div. 1932) Norma Talmadge (m. 1934; div. 1939) Lois Andrews (m. 1940; div. 1943)
- Children: 2

Signature
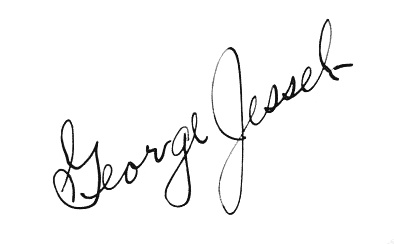

George Albert Jessel (April 3, 1898 – May 23, 1981) was an American actor, singer, songwriter, and film producer. He was famous in his lifetime as a multitalented comedic entertainer, achieving a level of recognition that transcended his limited roles in movies. He was widely known by his nickname, the "Toastmaster General of the United States," for his frequent role as the master of ceremonies at political and entertainment gatherings. Jessel originated the title role in the stage production of The Jazz Singer.

== Early years ==
Jessel was born to Jewish parents, Joseph and Charlotte "Lottie" (née Schwarz) Jessel, on 118th Street in Harlem, New York City. George was reputedly named after the British jurist George Jessel, who was his second cousin once removed and a member of a politically notable branch of the family. By age 10, he was appearing in vaudeville and on Broadway to support his family after the death of his father, who was a playwright.

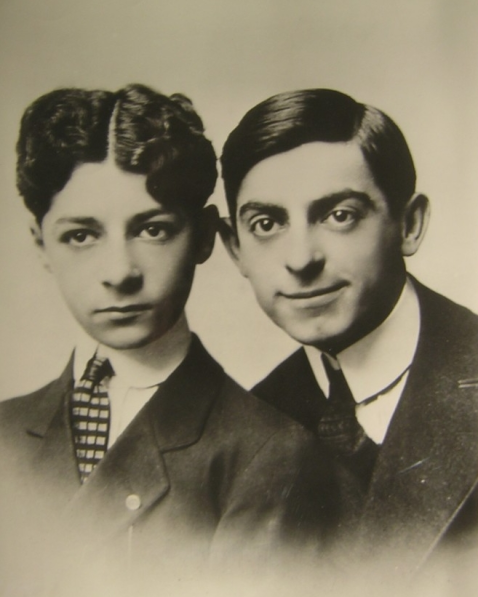
Jessel and Eddie Cantor, c. 1913

His mother, who worked as a ticket seller at the Imperial Theater, helped him form The Imperial Trio, a harmony group of ushers to entertain patrons of the theater, with Walter Winchell and Jack Wiener, using the stage names Leonard, Lawrence and McKinley, in their early teens (such usher-singer groups were common). At age 11, he was a partner of Eddie Cantor in a kid sketch and performed with him on stage until he outgrew the role at age 16. He later partnered with Lou Edwards and then became a solo performer.

== Career ==
=== Vaudeville ===
His most famous comedy skit was called "Hello Mama" or "Phone Call from Mama," which portrayed a one-sided telephone conversation. In 1919 he produced his own solo show, George Jessel's Troubles.

Jessel co-wrote the lyrics for a hit tune, "Oh How I Laugh When I Think How I Cried About You," and he performed in several successful comedy stage shows in the early 1920s. In 1921 he recorded a hit single, "The Toastmaster." He sometimes appeared in blackface in his vaudeville shows.

=== Film and broadcasting ===
Jessel appeared in his first motion picture, the silent movie The Other Man's Wife (1919). In 1924, he appeared in a brief comedy sketch in a short film made in the DeForest Phonofilm sound-on-film process.

In 1925, he emerged as one of the most popular leading men on Broadway with the starring role in the stage production of The Jazz Singer. The success of the show prompted Warner Bros.—after their success with Don Juan (1926) with music and sound effects only—to adapt The Jazz Singer as the first "talkie" with dialogue and to cast Jessel in the lead role. However, the studio refused his salary demands, so Jessel turned down the movie role, which was eventually played by Al Jolson. According to Jessel during an interview around 1980, Warner Bros. still owed Jessel money for earlier roles and lacked enough funds to produce this movie with a leading star. Jolson, the biographical inspiration for the movie, became the movie's main financial backer.

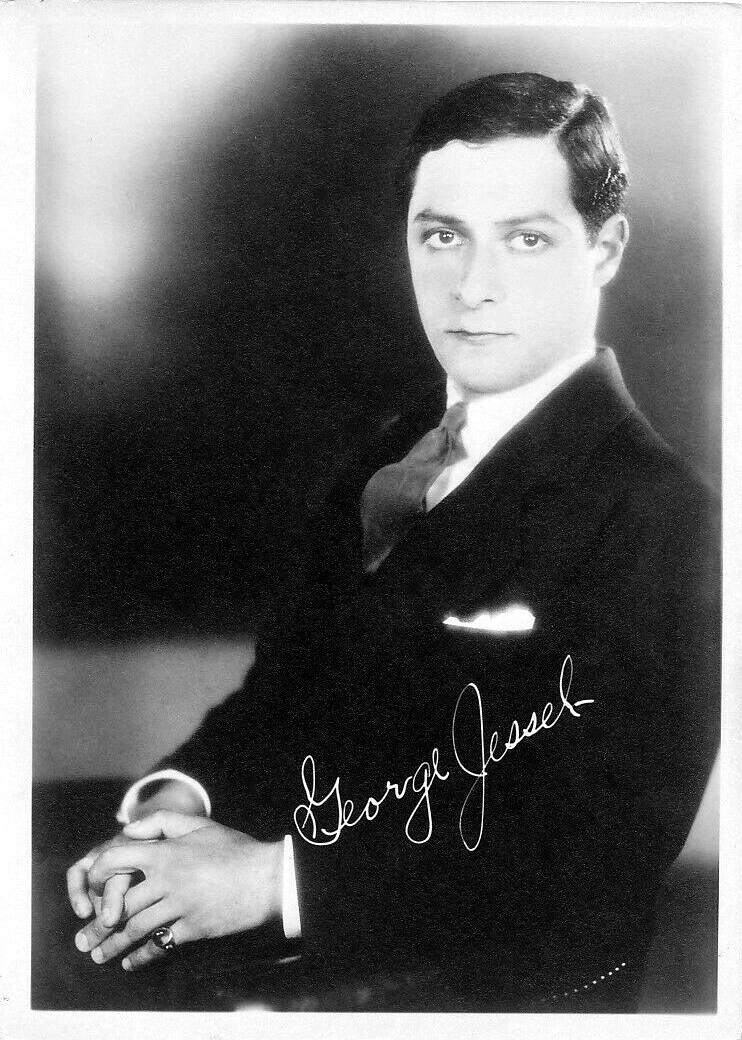
Jessel c. 1924

Jessel's next movie role was in Private Izzy Murphy (1926). Whereas Jolson's film career skyrocketed after the 1927 release of The Jazz Singer, Jessel remained in smaller movie roles, often intended for audiences fond of Jewish and other "ethnic" humor. He was elected to The Lambs Theatre Club in 1942.

In the mid-1940s, he began producing musicals for 20th Century Fox, producing 24 films in all in a career that lasted through the 1950s and 1960s. At the same time he became known as a host on the banquet circuit, famous for his good-natured wit aimed at his fellow celebrities. In 1946, he was one of the founding members of the California branch of the Friars Club. (A recording exists of an example of his "blue" work in front of a stag audience, although it was actually recorded at a roast hosted by the Friars' rival, the Masquers Club.) He also traveled widely overseas with the USO entertaining troops. As he grew older, he wrote eulogies for many of his contemporaries in Hollywood. He wrote three volumes of memoirs, So Help Me (1943), This Way, Miss (1955), and The World I Lived In (1975).

Jessel produced a number of Hollywood films, including The Dolly Sisters (1945), Nightmare Alley (1947), Golden Girl (1951) and The I Don't Care Girl (1953).

In the early 1950s, he performed on the radio in The George Jessel Show, which became a television series of the same name from 1953 to 1954.

HHe guest-starred on NBC's The Jimmy Durante Show. In 1968, he starred in Here Come the Stars, a syndicated variety show. By his later years, Jessel's style of entertainment was increasingly regarded as old-fashioned.

Later film roles included a cameo as himself in Valley of the Dolls (1967), The Busy Body (1967) opposite Sid Caesar, and the musical Can Heironymus Merkin Ever Forget Mercy Humppe and Find True Happiness? (1969), directed by and starring Anthony Newley. He made additional cameos in films including The Phynx (1970) and Won Ton Ton, the Dog Who Saved Hollywood (1976).

His final film appearances included Reds (1981), in which he appeared as one of numerous contemporaries of John Reed and Louise Bryant, and The Other Side of the Wind, which was filmed before his death but not released until 2018.

== Political views ==
Jessel was active in political causes throughout much of his career, and his political affiliations shifted over time. He supported the Democratic Party during the 1940s and 1950s. In 1948, he participated in a Democratic campaign rally supporting President Harry S. Truman. During the 1952 presidential election, Jessel supported Democratic nominee Adlai Stevenson II. In an October 1952 campaign broadcast sponsored by the International Ladies' Garment Workers' Union, Truman publicly thanked Jessel and Bette Davis for their efforts on Stevenson's behalf.

Jessel's politics subsequently became more conservative. He strongly supported the United States military effort in the Vietnam War and made several trips to Vietnam to entertain American servicemen. In the 1972 presidential election, he supported Republican President Richard Nixon's campaign for re-election.

His political views occasionally led to public controversy. In July 1971, following the publication of portions of the Pentagon Papers, Jessel appeared on NBC's Today and compared The New York Times and The Washington Post to the Soviet newspaper Pravda. Host Edwin Newman challenged Jessel over the remarks and ended the interview. In a 1977 interview, Jessel also said that he had tried to prevent Rebel Without a Cause from being distributed in Europe because he believed that the film portrayed Americans negatively and showed insufficient respect for law enforcement.

Jessel was also an outspoken supporter of Israel and raised funds on its behalf. United Press International reported in its obituary that he had received awards from Israeli and Zionist organizations for his fundraising activities.

Jessel, who had been identified as a Democrat and was an honoured guest at the 1960 Democratic National Convention, later associated with Republican politicians; in 1972, he attended an All Star Celebrity event with President Richard Nixon at Nixon's Western White House. He campaigned for his long-time friend, Ronald Reagan, during the 1980 presidential election. Reagan sent a message that was read at Jessel's funeral in 1981.

== Personal life ==
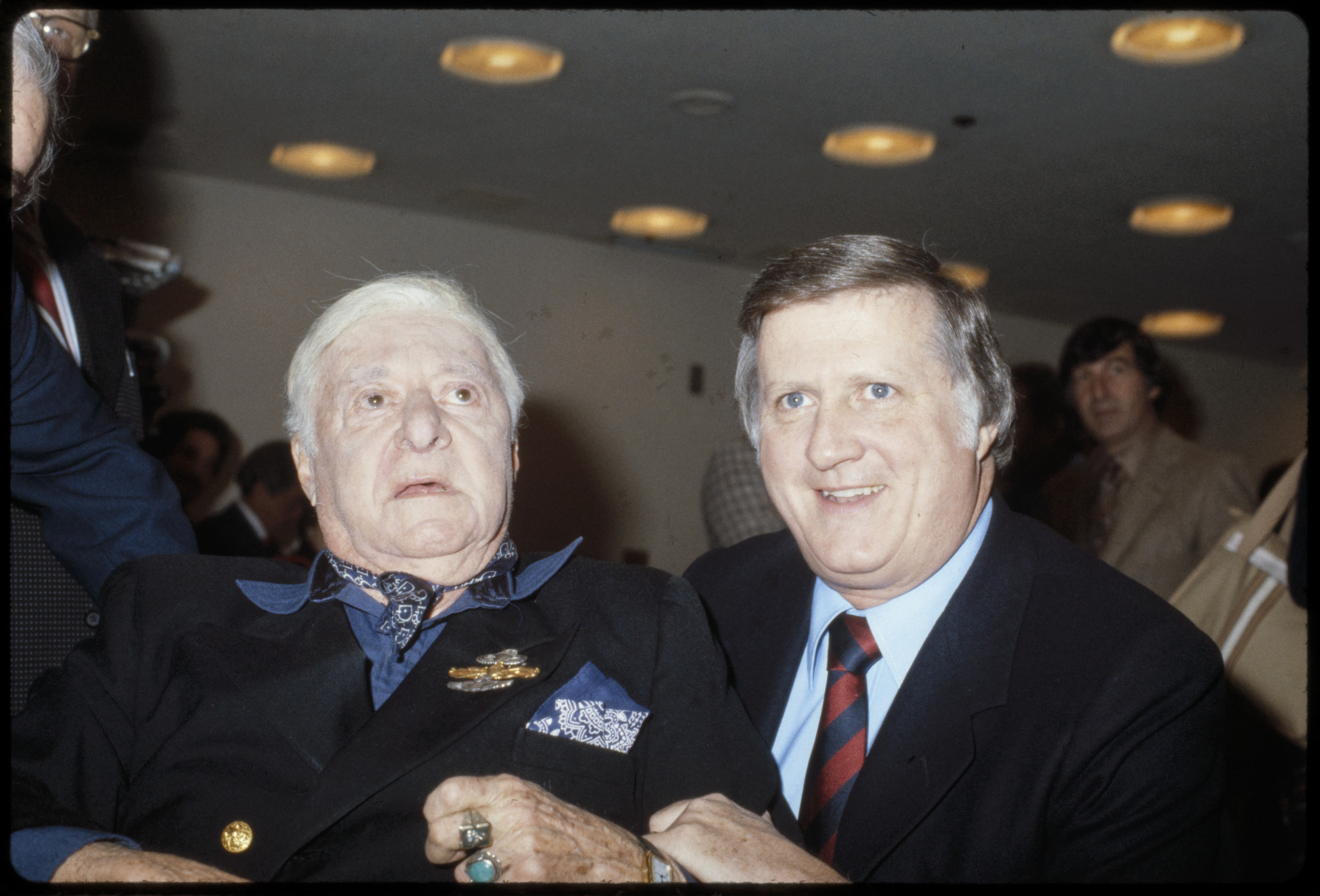
Jessel (left) and George Steinbrenner in 1980 at a comedy roast

In the 1930s, his personal life kept him in the public eye as much as his movies. On May 2, 1930, Jessel married Florence Courtney in Chicago. She divorced him on October 24, 1932, on the grounds of cruelty. On April 23, 1934, Jessel married silent movie star Norma Talmadge, causing a scandal because Talmadge was married at the time that they started their affair, and she obtained a Mexican divorce only ten days earlier. After their divorce on August 11, 1939, he caused another scandal by breaking into her house with a pistol and firing shots at her new lover. In 1940, he married a 16-year-old showgirl, Lois Andrews, when he was 42. They had a daughter, Jerrilyn, before divorcing in 1942. In his 1975 autobiography, The World I Lived In, Jessel claimed he had affairs with actresses Pola Negri, Helen Morgan and Lupe Vélez.

In 1961, actress Joan Tyler filed a paternity suit against Jessel claiming he was the father of her daughter Christine. Jessel later admitted he was Christine's father and settled the suit out of court. As part of the terms of the settlement, Jessel agreed to pay Tyler $500 a month in child support (equivalent to $5,322 in 2025).

In 1964, Jessel reportedly sexually groped an adult Shirley Temple. According to Temple, he invited her to his office under the guise of discussing a recent role. During their meeting, Jessel put an arm around Temple while taking off his pants. He then grabbed the 35-year-old Temple's breasts. She fought off his attempts by kicking him in the groin.

== Death ==
On May 23, 1981, Jessel died of a heart attack at the University of California at Los Angeles Medical Center at the age of 83. He was interred in the Hillside Memorial Park Cemetery in Culver City, California.

== Honors and awards ==
In 1969, the Academy of Motion Picture Arts and Sciences honored him for his charity work by awarding him the Jean Hersholt Humanitarian Award, a Special Academy Award. For his contribution to the motion picture industry, George Jessel has a star on the Hollywood Walk of Fame at 1777 Vine Street in Los Angeles.

== Filmography ==
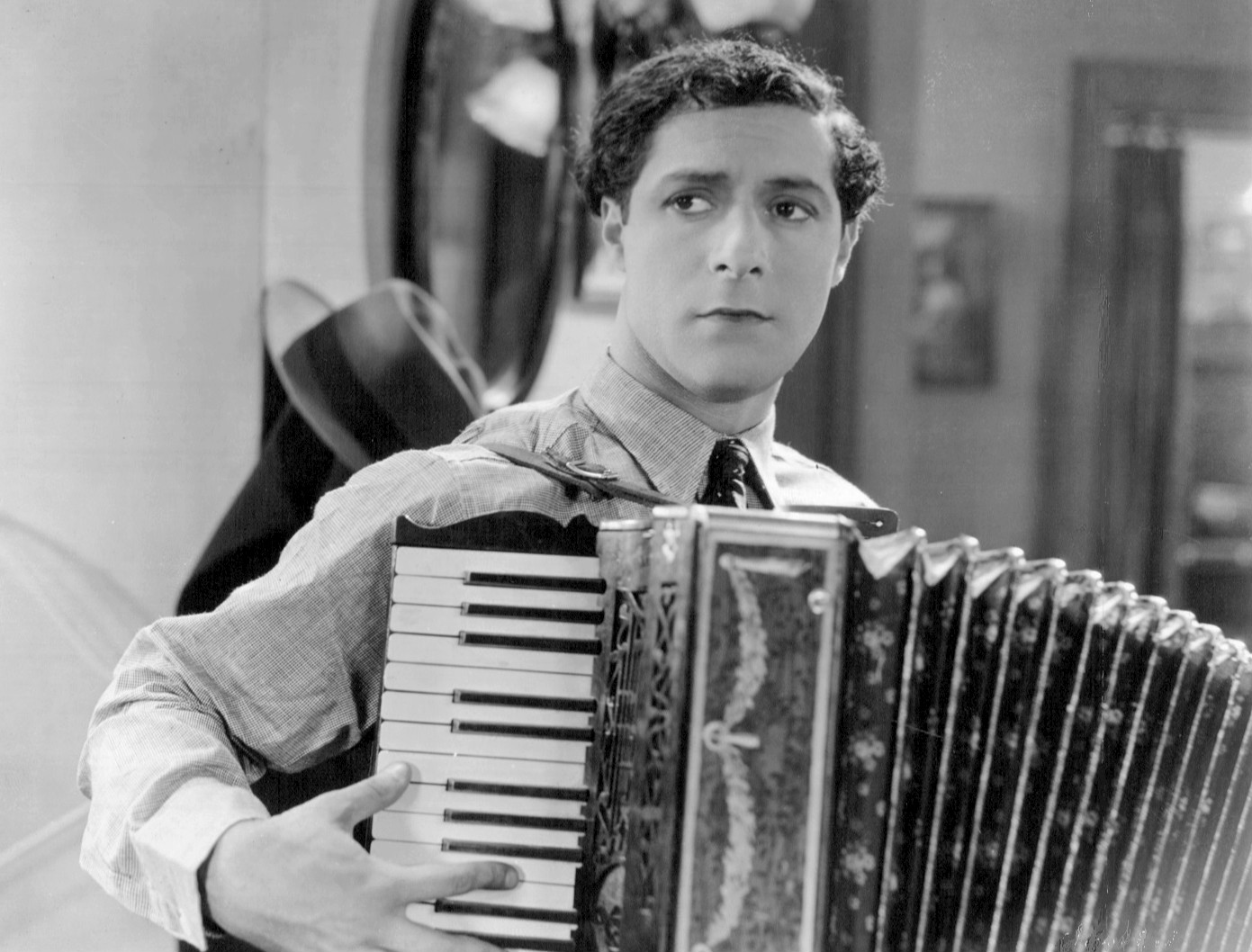
Jessel in Love, Live & Laugh, 1929

Year	Title	Role	Notes
1919	The Other Man's Wife	Davy Simon	Lost film
1926	Private Izzy Murphy	Isadore "Izzy" Murphy / Patrick Murphy	Lost film
1927	Sailor Izzy Murphy	Izzy Murphy	Lost film
1927	Ginsberg the Great	Johnny Ginsberg	Lost film
1928	George Washington Cohen	George Washington Cohen	Lost film
1929	Lucky Boy	Georgie Jessel	
1929	Happy Days	Minstrel show performer #4	
1929	Love, Live and Laugh	Luigi	
1943	Stage Door Canteen	Himself	
1944	Four Jills in a Jeep	Master of ceremonies	
1953	Yesterday and Today	Narrator	Voice
1953	The I Don't Care Girl	Himself	Uncredited
1957	Beau James	Himself	
1959	Juke Box Rhythm	Himself	
1967	The Busy Body	Mr. Fessel	
1967	Valley of the Dolls	MC Grammy Awards	
1969	Can Heironymus Merkin Ever Forget Mercy Humppe and Find True Happiness?	The Presence	
1970	The Phynx	Himself	
1976	Won Ton Ton, the Dog Who Saved Hollywood	Awards Announcer	
1981	Reds	Himself - Witness	
2018	The Other Side of the Wind	Himself	Final film role; filmed between 1970 and 1976
