= Passers By (1916 film) =

1916 film

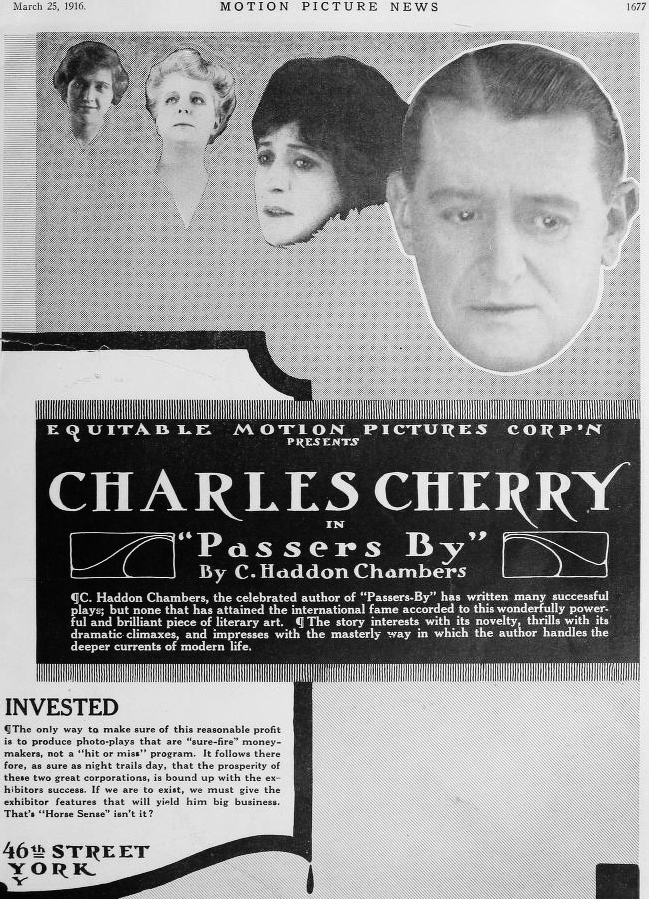
- Directed by: Stanner E.V. Taylor
- Written by: Stanner E.V. Taylor
- Based on: Passers By by C. Haddon Chambers
- Starring: Mary Charleson; Charles Cherry; Kate Sergeantson
- Cinematography: Herman Obrock Jr.
- Production company: Equitable Motion Pictures Corporation
- Distributed by: World Film
- Release date: March 6, 1916
- Running time: 50 minutes
- Country: United States
- Languages: Silent; English intertitles

Passers By is a 1916 American silent drama film directed by Stanner E.V. Taylor and starring Mary Charleson, Charles Cherry and Kate Sergeantson. It is based on a 1911 West End play of the same title by C. Haddon Chambers, which was later remade as Passers By in 1920.

== Synopsis ==
In England a young man falls in love with the governess to his stepsister's children. When she discovers about the potential relationship she does her best to sabotage it due to her snobbish attitudes.

== Cast ==
- Mary Charleson as Margaret Summers
- Charles Cherry as Peter Waverton
- Donald Kite as Peter Summers
- Kate Sergeantson as Lady Hurley
- Marguerite Skirvin as Beatrice Dainton

== Bibliography ==
- Connelly, Robert B. The Silents: Silent Feature Films, 1910-36, Volume 40, Issue 2. December Press, 1998.
- Goble, Alan. The Complete Index to Literary Sources in Film. Walter de Gruyter, 1999.
