= Captain Swift =

1920 silent film

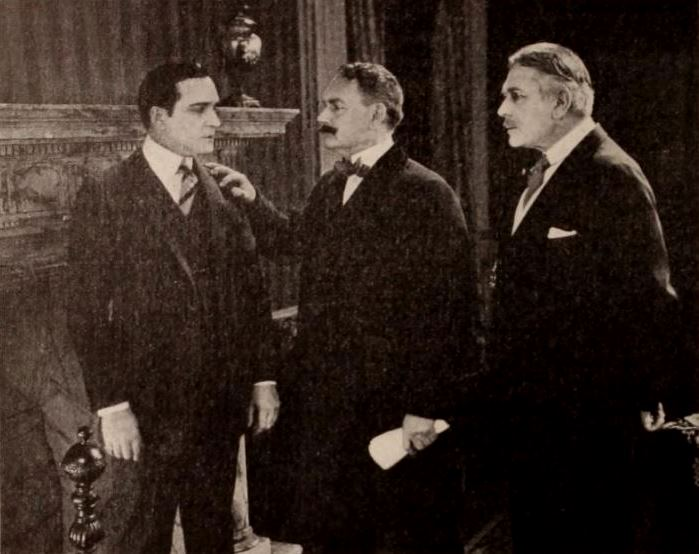
- Directed by: Tom Terriss; Chester Bennett
- Written by: Lucien Hubbard
- Based on: Captain Swift by C. Haddon Chambers
- Starring: Earle Williams; Florence Dixon; Edward Martindel
- Cinematography: Charles J. Davis; Jack MacKenzie
- Production company: Vitagraph Company of America
- Distributed by: Vitagraph Company of America
- Release date: April 1920
- Running time: 50 minutes
- Country: United States
- Languages: Silent; English intertitles

Captain Swift is a 1920 American silent drama film directed by Tom Terriss and Chester Bennett and starring Earle Williams, Florence Dixon and Edward Martindel. It is based on the 1888 play of the same title by C. Haddon Chambers.

== Plot ==
A notorious Australian outlaw manages to escape with the law close on his heels and heads to England where he lives under an assumed name, and becomes a fixture in London's high society.

== Cast ==
- Earle Williams as Captain Swift
- Florence Dixon as Stella Darbisher
- Edward Martindel as Gardiner
- Adelaide Prince as Lady Seabrook
- Downing Clarke as Sir Hugh Seabrook
- Barry Baxter as Harry Seabrook
- Alice Calhoun as Mabel Seabrook
- James O'Neill as Marshall
- H.H. Pattee as Ryan

== Bibliography ==
- Goble, Alan. The Complete Index to Literary Sources in Film. Walter de Gruyter, 1999.
