= Down the Stretch (1927 film) =

1927 film

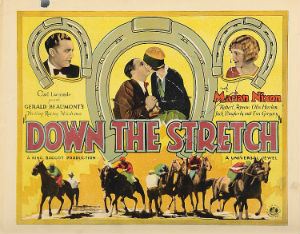
- Theatrical release poster
- Directed by: King Baggot
- Screenplay by: Curtis Benton
- Based on: The Money Rider; 1924 story in Redbook by Gerald Beaumont
- Starring: Robert Agnew; Marian Nixon; Virginia True Boardman; Lincoln Plumer; Jack Dougherty; Ward Crane
- Cinematography: John Stumar
- Production company: Universal Pictures
- Distributed by: Universal Pictures
- Release date: May 29, 1927
- Running time: 70 minutes
- Country: United States
- Language: Silent (English intertitles)

Down the Stretch is a 1927 American silent drama film directed by King Baggot and written by Curtis Benton. The film stars Robert Agnew, Marian Nixon, Virginia True Boardman, Lincoln Plumer, Jack Dougherty, and Ward Crane. The film was released on May 29, 1927, by Universal Pictures. A print of Down the Stretch exists in the Library of Congress film archive.

== Cast ==
- Robert Agnew as Marty Kruger
- Marian Nixon as Katie Kelly
- Virginia True Boardman as Mrs. Kruger
- Lincoln Plumer as Devlin
- Jack Dougherty as Tupper
- Ward Crane as Conlon
- Ben Hall as Pee Wee
- Otis Harlan as Babe Dilley
- Ena Gregory as Marion Hoyt
