= C. Haddon Chambers =

Australian dramatist (1860–1921)

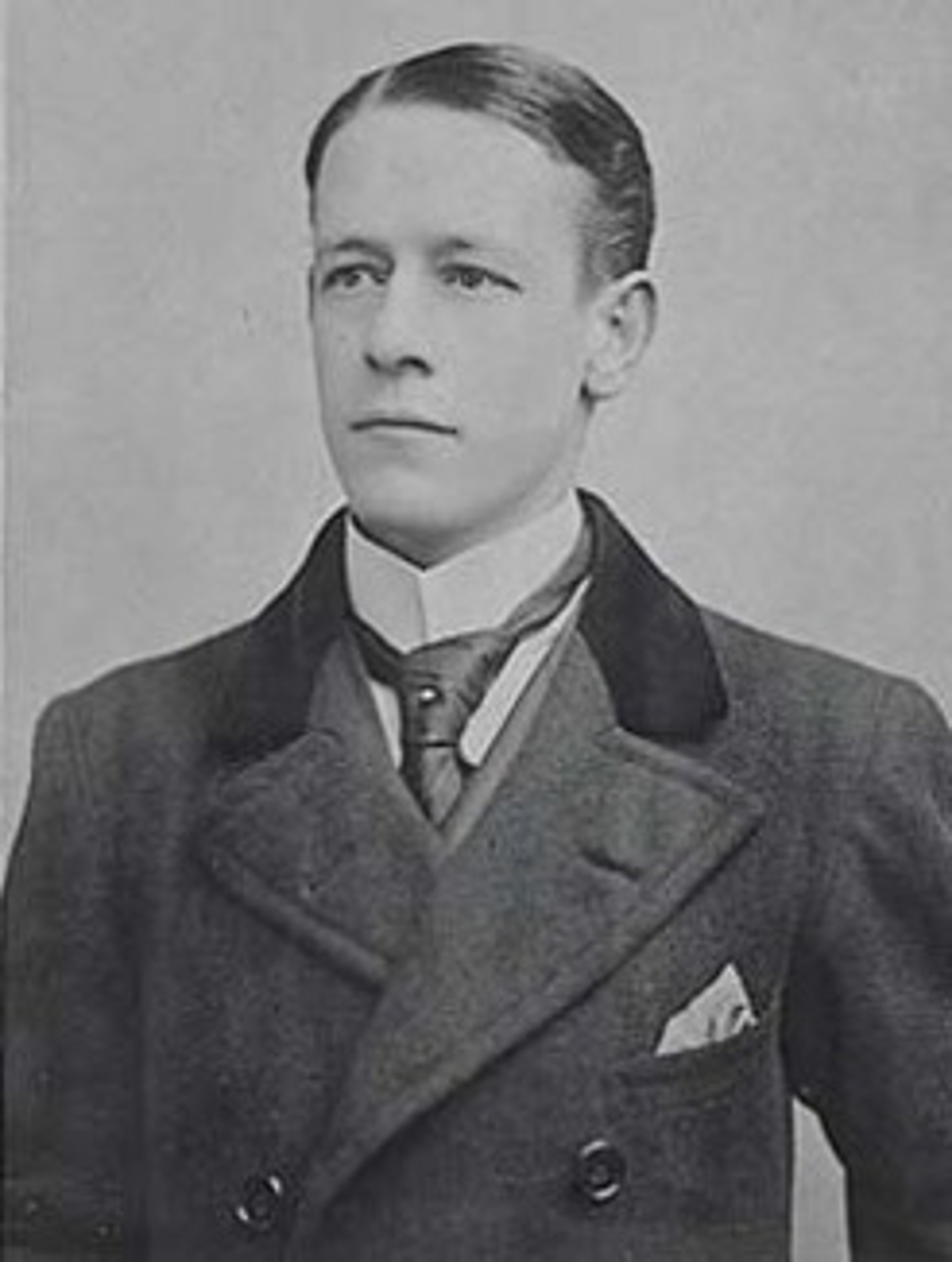
C. H. Chambers c. 1888

Charles Haddon Spurgeon Chambers (22 April 1860 – 28 March 1921) was an Australia-born dramatist, active in England.

== Early life ==
Chambers was born in Petersham, Sydney. After two years in the outback working as a boundary rider, in 1880 he was invited by cousins to return with them to Ulster, from there he visited England. On Chambers' return he was in the managerial department of the Montague-Turner opera company.

The famous London-based Australian operatic soprano, Dame Nellie Melba, was his mistress for a number of years. The relationship ended in 1904 for reasons which remain unclear.

== Late life ==
Chambers retained his interest in Australia and spoke of returning there but never did so. He died at the Bath Club, London of cerebro-vascular disease on 28 March 1921 and was buried at Kensal Green Cemetery.

== Works ==
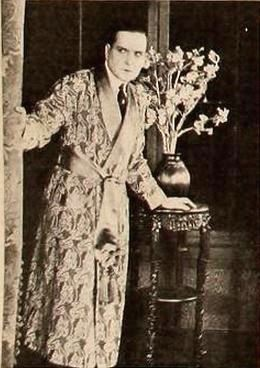
Still from the film of Captain Swift (1920) with Earle Williams

- Captain Swift 1888, filmed in 1920, directed by Tom Terriss and Chester Bennett
- The Idler 1890 (play)
- Thumb-Nail Sketches of Australian Life 1891 (short story collection)
- The Fatal Card 1895 (play)
- The Tyranny of Tears: A Comedy in Four Acts 1900 (play)
- A Modern Magdalen 1902 (play)
- The Open Gate: An Original Domestic Drama in One Act 1902 (play)
- The Awakening: A play in Four Acts 1902 (play)
- Sir Anthony: A Comedy of the Outskirts in Three Acts 1909 (play)
- Passers-By: A Play in Four Acts 1913 (play)
- The Impossible Woman 1914 (play) (aka Tante)
- The Saving Grace: A Comedy in Three Acts 1918 (play)
