= Captain Flagg and Sergeant Quirt =

Radio comedy programme

- Genre: Situation comedy
- Country of origin: United States
- Language: English
- Syndicates: Blue Network; NBC
- Starring: Victor McLaglen; Edmund Lowe; William Gargan
- Written by: John P. Medbury
- Produced by: Mel Williamson
- Original release: September 28, 1941 – April 3, 1942

Captain Flagg and Sergeant Quirt is an American old-time radio situation comedy. It was broadcast on the Blue Network from September 28, 1941, until January 25, 1942, and on NBC from February 13, 1942, until April 3, 1942.

== Format ==
Captain Flagg and Sergeant Quirt was based on the play What Price Glory? (1924) by Laurence Stallings and Maxwell Anderson. The title characters were Marines who often squabbled over women. Flagg was "portrayed as a dense and gullible officer", which resulted in protests from officials of the U. S. Marine Corps. Writers revised the show, replacing Quirt with a new character, Sergeant Bliss. The series ended six weeks after that change. A spokesman for NBC said, "changing conditions in the war emergency have made it impossible to bring the program within the limits of NBC program policies", resulting in the cancellation. When the cancellation was announced, sponsors said that the program would be revived after the end of the war.

== Personnel ==
Initially, Victor McLaglen portrayed Flagg and Edmund Lowe played Quirt, characters they had already played in the 1926 film version of What Price Glory? and its three sequel films The Cock-Eyed World (1929), Women of All Nations (1931), and Hot Pepper (1933). William Gargan began playing Flagg early in 1942.

Fred Shields portrayed Bliss and Cliff Arquette played Ol' Doc. Mel Williamson was the program's producer, and John P. Medbury was the writer.

== Schedule and sponsors ==
From September 28, 1941, until January 25, 1942, Captain Flagg and Sergeant Quirt was broadcast on the Blue Network at 7:30 on Sundays, sponsored by Mennen toiletries. From February 13, 1942, until April 3, 1942, it was on NBC at 10 on Fridays, sponsored by Brown & Williamson tobacco.

Episodes of the program were recorded for rebroadcast over four radio stations in Alaska so that Army and Navy personnel there could hear them. The rebroadcasts were done in response to a request by the Morale Branch of the War Department.

== Reception ==
John K. Hutchens, writing in The New York Times, contrasted the title characters in this program with their counterparts in What Price Glory?. He described their mellowing "into a pair of jolly pranksters to whom war is a pretty happy-go-lucky proposition". Previously, he explained, "they were cursing war as a brutal if necessary business and now it is a lively escapade full of jokes". He added, "Even if the jokes were funny they would still smack of laughter earned under dubious pretenses".
