= No More Women (1934 film) =

1934 film by Albert S. Rogell

- Directed by: Albert S. Rogell
- Screenplay by: John Mikale Strong; Delmer Daves; Grant Leenhouts; Lou Breslow
- Produced by: Harry Joe Brown
- Starring: Edmund Lowe; Victor McLaglen; Sally Blane; Minna Gombell; Alphonse Ethier; J.P. McGowan; Harold Huber
- Cinematography: Harry Fischbeck; Theodor Sparkuhl
- Edited by: Joseph Kane
- Production company: Paramount Pictures
- Distributed by: Paramount Pictures
- Release date: February 23, 1934
- Running time: 76 minutes
- Country: United States
- Language: English

No More Women is a 1934 American pre-Code adventure film directed by Albert S. Rogell and starring Edmund Lowe, Victor McLaglen, Sally Blane and Minna Gombell. The film was released and distributed by Paramount Pictures. It was part of a long-running series that paired Lowe and McLaglen as friendly rivals dating back to the 1926 silent film What Price Glory?.

== Plot ==
Two salvage divers are romantic rivals for the love of Annie Fay. They both agree to back off and swear that they will pursue "no more women". However soon afterwards one of their boats is inherited by the attractive Helen Young who takes up quarters aboard. This triggers a new rivalry between them, and leads briefly to one of them wrongly being suspected of the other's murder. They join forces to thwart an attempt to kill them by a greedy rival crew when they are diving to recover a cargo of gold bullion. Ultimately Helen picks neither of them, telling them they are like brothers to her and they again pledge to give up women.

== Cast ==
- Edmund Lowe as Three-Time
- Victor McLaglen as Forty-Fathoms
- Sally Blane as Helen Young
- Minna Gombell as Annie Fay
- Alphonse Ethier as Captain Brent
- J. P. McGowan as Captain of The Hawk
- Harold Huber as Iceberg
- Tom Dugan as Greasy
- Christian Rub as Big Pants
- Frank Moran as Brownie
- Billy Franey as Oscar
- Thomas E. Jackson as Detective
