= What Price Glory (play) =

1924 comedy-drama play

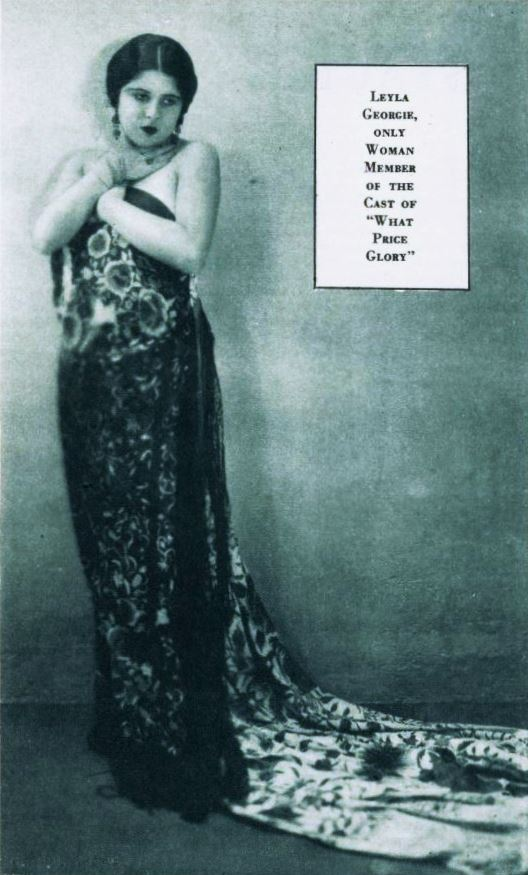
- Leyla Georgie in the play
- Original language: English
- Written by: Maxwell Anderson and Laurence Stallings
- Genre: Drama
- Setting: Company Headquarters in a French farmhouse in the zone of advance; a cellar in a disputed town; and the bar at Cognac Pete's.

Premiere
- Date: September 3, 1924
- Place: Plymouth Theatre

What Price Glory is a 1924 comedy-drama written by poet/playwright Maxwell Anderson and journalist/critic/veteran Laurence Stallings. It was Anderson's first commercial success, with a long run on Broadway, starring Louis Wolheim.

The play depicted the rivalry between two U.S. Marine Corps officers fighting in France during World War I.

The play was notable for its profanity, "toot goddam sweet," etc., and for censorship efforts by military and religious groups. These efforts failed when the primary censorship authority, Rear Admiral Charles P. Plunkett, was revealed by columnist Heywood Broun to have written a far more vulgar series of letters to a General Chatelaine.

The play's success allowed Anderson to quit teaching and journalism, and start his long and successful career as a professional playwright. It was included in Burns Mantle's The Best Plays of 1924-1925.

== Synopsis ==
Flagg and Quirt are veteran United States Marines whose rivalry dates back a number of years. Flagg is commissioned a captain in command of a company on the front lines of France during World War I. Sergeant Quirt is assigned to Flagg's unit as the senior non-commissioned officer. Flagg and Quirt quickly resume their rivalry, which this time takes its form over the affections of Charmaine, the daughter of the local innkeeper. However, Charmaine's desire for a husband and the reality of war give the two men a common cause.

== Original cast ==
(In the order listed in Three American plays (1926), by Maxwell Anderson and Laurence Stallings (p. 2):

- Corporal Gowdy - Brian Donlevy
- Corporal Kiper - Fuller Mellish, Jr.
- Corporal Lipinsky - George Tobias
- First Sergeant Quirt - William Boyd
- Captain Flagg - Louis Wolheim
- Charmaine de la Cognac - Leyla Georgie
- Private Lewisohn - Sidney Elliott
- Lieutenant Aldrich - Fay Roope
- Lieutenant Moore - Clyde North
- Lieutenant Schmidt - Charles Costigan
- Gunnery Sergeant Sockkel - Henry G. Shelvey
- Private Mulcahy - Jack MacGraw
- Sergeant Ferguson - James A. Devine
- A Brigade Runner - John J. Cavanaugh
- Monsieur Pete de la Cognac - Luis Alberni
- Another Brigade Runner - Arthur Campbell
- Brigadier General Cokeley - Roy La Rue
- A Colonel (HQ Staff) - Keane Waters
- A Captain (HQ Staff) - William B. Smith
- A Lieutenant (HQ Staff) - Fred Brophy
- Another Lieutenant (HQ Staff) - Thomas Buckley
- A Chaplain - John C. Davis
- Town Mayor - Alfred Renaud
- Spike - Keane Waters
- Pharmacist's Mate - Thomas Sullivan
- Lieutenant Cunningham - J. Merrill Holmes
- Lieutenant Lundstrom - Robert Warner

== Film versions ==
In 1926 the play was adapted into a film, What Price Glory, directed by Raoul Walsh and starring Edmund Lowe as Quirt and Victor McLagen as Flagg. Walsh also directed a musical sequel film three years later when sound films emerged in 1929, titled The Cock-Eyed World, and a further sequel titled Women of All Nations in 1931, each with Lowe and McLaglen playing the same characters. A third sequel in 1933, Hot Pepper, with McLaglen and Lowe again reprising their roles, was directed by John Blystone.

The original play was adapted for a film again in 1952, titled What Price Glory and starring James Cagney. The 1952 remake was directed by John Ford, who had directed the play on a California stage tour in 1949 with a gala cast (including Pat O'Brien, Ward Bond, Maureen O'Hara, Gregory Peck and John Wayne) as a benefit for the Military Order of the Purple Heart, of which Ford was a commander.

== See also ==
- Two Arabian Knights - unrelated 1927 film starring the play's two leads Boyd and Wolheim
- Captain Flagg and Sergeant Quirt - radio situation comedy (1941–42)
