= What's Buzzin', Cousin? =

1943 film by Charles Barton

- Theatrical release poster
- Directed by: Charles Barton
- Screenplay by: Harry Sauber; John P. Medbury
- Story by: Aben Kandel
- Produced by: Jack Fier
- Starring: Ann Miller; Eddie "Rochester" Anderson; John Hubbard; Freddy Martin; Leslie Brooks; Jeff Donnell
- Cinematography: Joseph Walker
- Edited by: James Sweeney
- Production company: Columbia Pictures
- Distributed by: Columbia Pictures
- Release date: July 8, 1943
- Running time: 75 minutes
- Country: United States
- Language: English

What's Buzzin', Cousin? is a 1943 American musical film directed by Charles Barton and written by Harry Sauber and John P. Medbury. The film stars Ann Miller, Eddie "Rochester" Anderson, John Hubbard, Freddy Martin, Leslie Brooks and Jeff Donnell. The film was released on July 8, 1943, by Columbia Pictures.

== Cast ==
- Ann Miller as Ann Crawford
- Eddie "Rochester" Anderson as Himself
- John Hubbard as Jimmy Ross
- Freddy Martin as Himself
- Leslie Brooks as Josie
- Jeff Donnell as Billie
- Carol Hughes as May
- Theresa Harris as Blossom
- Roy Gordon as Jim Langford
- Bradley Page as Pete Hartley
- Warren Ashe as Dick Bennett
- Dub Taylor as Jed
- Betsy Gay as Saree
- Louis Mason as Hillbilly
- Eugene Jackson as Bellboy
- Jessie Arnold as Mrs. Hillbilly
- Erville Alderson as Gas Station Attendant
- Harry Tyler as Harry
- Walter Soderling as Mr. Hayes
