= Sea Devils (1937 film) =

1937 film by Benjamin Stoloff

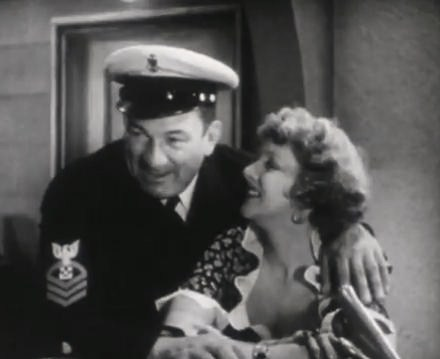
- Victor McLaglen and Helen Flint in film
- Directed by: Benjamin Stoloff
- Written by: Frank Wead; Edmund Joseph
- Screenplay by: Frank Wead; John Twist; P. J. Wolfson
- Produced by: Edward Small
- Starring: Victor McLaglen; Ida Lupino; Preston Foster
- Cinematography: Joseph H. August; J. Roy Hunt
- Edited by: Arthur Roberts
- Music by: Roy Webb
- Production company: RKO Radio Pictures
- Distributed by: RKO Radio Pictures
- Release date: February 19, 1937
- Running time: 88 minutes
- Country: United States
- Language: English
- Budget: $477,000
- Box office: $940,000

Sea Devils is a 1937 American action film directed by Benjamin Stoloff and starring Victor McLaglen, Ida Lupino and Preston Foster. Among the American "preparedness films" of the mid-1930s devoted to enhancing the image of the Army (Flirtation Walk), the Navy (Here Comes the Navy) and the Marines (The Singing Marine, Devil Dogs of the Air), this entry focuses equivalent approving attention on the work of the U.S. Coast Guard.

== Plot ==
A Coast Guard Chief Petty Officer's personality conflict with his younger counterpart gets physical when the seaman casts his eye on the Chief's librarian daughter, among iceberg destruction missions, dramatic boat rescues, and fistfights.

== Cast ==
- Victor McLaglen as CPO William Malone
- Preston Foster as Michael O'Shea
- Ida Lupino as Doris Malone
- Donald Woods as Steve Webb
- Helen Flint as Sadie Bennett
- Gordon Jones as Puggy
- Pierre Watkin as USCGC Taroe commander
- Murray Alper as Seaman Brown
- Billy Gilbert as Billy (policeman)

Unbilled players include Lane Chandler, George Irving, Dwight Frye Charles Lane and Brad Slaven.

== Production ==
The film was to be directed by James Flood, but he left the project shortly before shooting after a disagreement with producer Small.

== Reception ==
The film was popular and made a profit of $155,000.
