= Ben Markson =

American screenwriter

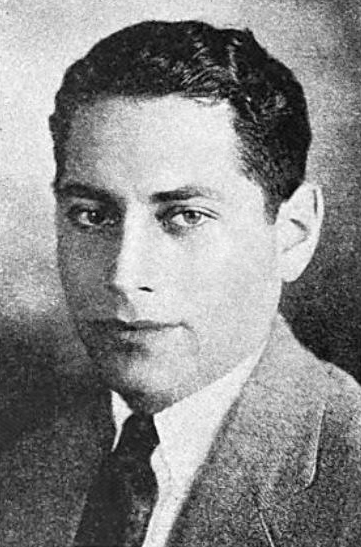
- Born: Benjamin Allen Markson; August 6, 1897; Creston, Iowa, United States
- Died: October 20, 1971 (aged 74); Los Angeles County, California, United States
- Occupation: Screenwriter
- Years active: 1928–1959
- Spouses: Janet Pavelik(e) (aka Dawn) (m. 1931) Miriam Edwards (née Harkins) (m. 1944)

Benjamin Allen Markson (August 6, 1897 – October 20, 1971) was an American screenwriter active from the very beginning of the sound film era through the end of the 1950s. During his 30-year career he was responsible for the story and/or screenplay of 45 films, as well as writing the scripts for several episodic television shows in the 1950s.

== Life and career ==
Benjamin Allen Markson was born on August 6, 1897, in Creston, Iowa. His parents were Abraham Markson (born Lithuania) and Goldie Baior (born Poland). Prior to writing screenplays, Markson worked as a journalist, and then was part of the publicity department for Paramount Pictures. He would break into the film industry as the co-screenwriter on the 1928 film The River Pirate, a silent film with sound sequences starring Victor McLaglen.

In the pre-code era of the early 1930s, Markson was known for his racy scripts. Some of his early successes include: The Half-Naked Truth, a 1932 comedy directed by Gregory La Cava and starring Lupe Vélez and Lee Tracy; Is My Face Red? (1932), which Markson and co-screenwriter Casey Robinson based on Markson's play which he co-wrote with Allen Rivkin; co-wrote the screenplay (with Jane Murfin) for What Price Hollywood?, also in 1932, directed by George Cukor, and starring Constance Bennett and Lowell Sherman; Lady Killer (1933), starring James Cagney; and 1934's Here Comes the Navy, a romantic comedy again starring Cagney. Other notable films on which Markson contributed to the script included: 1937's screwball comedy, Danger – Love at Work, directed by Otto Preminger, for which he co-wrote the screenplay; the 1938 classic Rebecca of Sunnybrook Farm, starring Shirley Temple; and Mr. District Attorney (1947), starring Dennis O'Keefe and Adolphe Menjou. Markson served on the board of directors of the Screen Writers Guild in the latter half of the 1930s.

Later in his career, Markson worked on the scripts for several film series, including A Close Call for Boston Blackie (the Boston Blackie series), and The Falcon in San Francisco in 1945 (The Falcon series). In the 1950s, Markson wrote the teleplays for several episodic television shows, including The Cisco Kid and Racket Squad. Markson's last contribution to film was the story for the 1959 crime drama, Edge of Eternity, starring Cornel Wilde and Victoria Shaw.

Markson was the brother-in-law of actor George Montgomery. Markson died on October 20, 1971, in Los Angeles County, California.

== Filmography ==
(Per AFI database)

- The River Pirate (1928)
- Masked Emotions (1929)
- The Half-Naked Truth (1932)
- Is My Face Red? (1932)
- What Price Hollywood? (1932)
- Rackety Rax (1932)
- Gold Diggers of 1933 (1933)
- Girl Missing (1933)
- Picture Snatcher (1933)
- Lady Killer (1933)
- Lucky Devils (1933)
- The Silk Express (1933)
- Goodbye Again (1933)
- Babbitt (1934)
- Upperworld (1934)
- Big Hearted Herbert (1934)
- Here Comes the Navy (1934)
- The Case of the Howling Dog (1934)
- The White Cockatoo (1935)
- Bright Lights (1935)
- The Case of the Lucky Legs (1935)
- Going Highbrow (1935)
- Brides Are Like That (1936)
- Nobody's Fool (1936)
- Flying Hostess (1936)
- That I May Live (1937)
- Woman-Wise (1937)
- Ready, Willing and Able (1937)
- Sing Me a Love Song (1937)
- Sing and Be Happy (1937)
- Danger – Love at Work (1937)
- Rebecca of Sunnybrook Farm (1938)
- Pride of the Navy (1939)
- I Was a Convict (1939)
- The Great Mr. Nobody (1941)
- The Smiling Ghost (1941)
- Thieves Fall Out (1941)
- He Hired the Boss (1943)
- The Beautiful Cheat (1945)
- The Falcon in San Francisco (1945)
- Prison Ship (1945)
- A Close Call for Boston Blackie (1946)
- It Happened on 5th Avenue (1947)
- Mr. District Attorney (1947)
- Edge of Eternity (1959)
