= City of Shadows (1955 film) =

1955 film by William Witney

- Theatrical release poster
- Directed by: William Witney
- Screenplay by: Houston Branch
- Produced by: William J. O'Sullivan
- Starring: Victor McLaglen; John Baer; Kathleen Crowley; Anthony Caruso; June Vincent; Richard Reeves
- Cinematography: Reggie Lanning
- Edited by: Tony Martinelli
- Music by: Robert Armbruster; R. Dale Butts
- Production company: Republic Pictures
- Distributed by: Republic Pictures
- Release date: June 2, 1955
- Running time: 70 minutes
- Country: United States
- Language: English

City of Shadows is a 1955 American crime film directed by William Witney and written by Houston Branch. The film stars Victor McLaglen, John Baer, Kathleen Crowley, Anthony Caruso, June Vincent and Richard Reeves. The film was released on June 2, 1955 by Republic Pictures.

== Plot ==
Big Tim Channing is a small-time racketeer who makes a living supplying old, out-of-date slot machines to businesses. Gangsters Di Bruno and Finetti are his main competition. He finds that many gamblers are using slugs rather than coins to play his machines. He catches 12-year-old Dan Mason, an orphaned newsboy, using slugs. Dan admits he and all the other newsboys use slugs, winning jackpots to make money. Channing realizes he can drive other racketeers out of business by having the newsboys fill the slot machines with slugs. Channing becomes a father-figure to the boy.

Ten years later, Channing has taken over all the rackets in the city and Di Bruno and Finetti now work for him. Dan is going to law school. Dan is adept at finding legal loopholes to help Tim and his gang avoid conviction. Dan is romancing Fern Fellows, daughter of a retired judge, so that he can get at the rare law books in her father's collection. He uses these books to find the loopholes that help Channing. When Dan's background is exposed, Fern makes him promise to stop being a crook.

After graduating from law school, Dan persuades Channing to "go legit" (get out of the rackets and into legal business). Dan, meanwhile, opens a firm that supplies security guards. Di Bruno and Finetti pressure Channing to resume crime, and he starts a protection racket. Channing avoids targeting any firm employing Dan's security service.

One of the district attorney's men, Phil Jergins begins to investigate Dan's firm in the belief that Dan is running the protection racket. Jergins pretends to be a public relations man, and is hired by Dan. Jergins nonchalantly gives Dan's secretary some pencils that secretly contain a luminous material. At night, Jergins collects the security company's records from the trash using ultraviolet light. Channing learns of the law's interest in Dan's firm, and alerts Dan. Dan is furious once he realizes that Channing only knew about the luminous pencils through his underworld contacts.

In despair, Dan (who did not know that Channing was sparing him from the protection racket) decides to close his company and cancel his engagement to marry Fern. Channing goes to the district attorney and confesses his crimes to prove Dan's innocence. Dan relents, and he and Fern marry.

Di Bruno and Finetti, realizing that Channing has ratted them out as well, shoot Channing. Channing, however, manages to shoot and kill the two gangsters in turn. Channing dies in Dan's arms, telling him, "When you play with slugs, you get slugged on another day."

== Cast ==
- Victor McLaglen as Big Tim Channing
- John Baer as Dan Mason
- Kathleen Crowley as Fern Fellows
- Anthony Caruso as Tony Finetti
- Richard Reeves as Angelo Di Bruno
- Frank Ferguson as District Attorney Hunt
- Richard Travis as Phil Jergins
