= Is My Face Red? =

1932 film directed by William A. Seiter

- Directed by: William A. Seiter; James Anderson (assistant)
- Screenplay by: Ben Markson; Casey Robinson
- Based on: Is My Face Red? by Ben Markson; Allen Rivkin
- Produced by: Harry Joe Brown
- Starring: Helen Twelvetrees; Ricardo Cortez; Jill Esmond; Robert Armstrong; Arline Judge
- Cinematography: Leo Tover
- Edited by: Joseph Kane
- Music by: Max Steiner
- Production company: RKO Pictures
- Distributed by: RKO Pictures
- Release date: June 17, 1932 (US)
- Running time: 66 minutes
- Country: United States
- Language: English

Is My Face Red? is a 1932 American pre-Code drama film directed by William A. Seiter and written by Ben Markson and Casey Robinson. The film focuses on Bill Poster, a hugely successful newspaper and radio columnist, who pursues scandal in New York City from penthouses to the gutters. The film stars Helen Twelvetrees, Ricardo Cortez, Jill Esmond, Robert Armstrong and Arline Judge. It was released on June 17, 1932, by RKO Pictures.

== Plot ==
William Poster is the famous muck-raking reporter on New York City's fictional Morning Gazette who knows the secrets of the upper crust. He refuses to back down when faced with lawsuits. He fills his water cooler with a carefully mixed cocktail. Peggy Bannon, his long-suffering showgirl lover—now a star, she has worn his diamond ring for five years—feeds him information for his column. Peggy tells him that socialite and blue-blooded heiress Mildred Huntington has broken her engagement and is sailing to Europe. Poster sneaks aboard. Instantly attracted to each other, they begin an affair and take the pilot boat back to New York.

One night, Poster—following a hot tip—meets Peggy in a speak easy. Maloney, reporter on a rival paper, The Evening Examiner, is there. Poster boasts about his success and how much money he makes, but Maloney says the price in lost integrity is too high. Poster sends Peggy out to phone Maloney's wife, who calls the bar and tells him to come home. Spinello comes into the bar and argues with Tony in Italian. Tony stabs him to death when Spinello reaches into a pocket—to pull out a cigar. Poster witnesses the murder. Tony tells the couple horrific stories of people who are tortured and mutilated because they did not keep secrets.

Poster calls the newspaper to report the murder, leaving Peggy frightened and upset. He praises her in poetic terms to the telephone operator, and the two end up kissing in the phone booth. Shortly afterward, Tony calls the office to make veiled threats, which Peggy overhears. Nervously fidgeting with her loose ring, she gives it to Poster, who takes it to be remounted.

Meanwhile, Poster follows through on his promise to show Mildred around New York City. While playfully offering her a penny for her thoughts, he accidentally produces Peggy’s ring, which Mildred interprets as a proposal and accepts. Peggy later reads about the incident in the newspapers.

During the Gazette radio show, Poster exposes secrets about Mildred’s friends. He also reveals that Tony had threatened him, openly accuses him of murder, and states that he has testified before the grand jury.

Peggy is fed up with his two-timing and “tells all” to Maloney at The Examiner. Mildred has also had it, and gives Poster back his ring. Maloney is set to print the sordid details of Poster's romances, but Poster breaks the scandal himself in his own column. Tony comes into the office from the fire escape, shoots Poster, and returns the way he came.

In the hospital, Peggy warns Poster that he may not be so lucky in the future. He promises to be “everybody's big brother” and wonders if they ever caught Tony. Maloney hands him a huge bouquet of roses, wrapped in The Examiner, whose headline proclaims “Reporter Nabs Killer” with the subhead “Edward Maloney captures armed desperado.” Furious, Poster calls Maloney a “double-crossing rat” who scooped him on his own shooting. “Ah, ah, ah!” Peggy puts her hand over his mouth. Poster calms down and smiles: “Is my face red!”

== Cast ==
- Helen Twelvetrees as Peggy Bannon, star performer
- Ricardo Cortez as William Poster, columnist on The Morning Gazette
- Jill Esmond as Mildred Huntington, heiress
- Robert Armstrong as Ed Maloney, reporter on The Evening Examiner
- Arline Judge as Bee, Poster's Secretary
- Zasu Pitts as Morning Gazette Telephone Operator
- Clarence Muse as Horatio
- Sidney Toler as Tony Mugatti, the bartender
- Fletcher Norton as Angelo Spinelli
