= Reported Missing (1922 film) =

1922 silent film

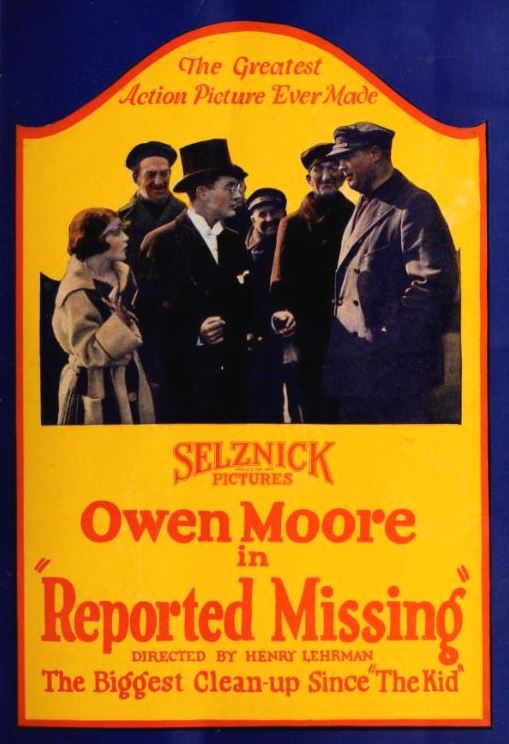
- Directed by: Henry Lehrman
- Written by: Lewis Allen Browne; Henry Lehrman; Owen Moore; Tom Bret; E.V. Durling; H.I. Phillips; Will B. Johnstone; John P. Medbury
- Produced by: Lewis J. Selznick; Myron Selznick
- Starring: Owen Moore; Pauline Garon; Tom Wilson
- Cinematography: Jules Cronjager
- Edited by: George M. Arthur
- Production company: Selznick Pictures
- Distributed by: Select Pictures
- Release date: April 5, 1922 (USA)
- Running time: 70 minutes
- Country: United States
- Language: Silent (English intertitles)

Reported Missing is a 1922 American silent comedy film directed by Henry Lehrman and starring Owen Moore, Pauline Garon, and Tom Wilson.

== Plot ==
As described in a film magazine review, Richard Boyd comes into possession of the Boyd Shipping Company through inheritance. The company has an option to obtain a huge fleet of ships much sought after by Young, a scheming Asian shipping magnate. Boyd, a habitual idler, is disinterested in the matter until Pauline makes him get down to business and save these ships for America. Young kidnaps Richard and Pauline on a ship and puts out to sea. The ship becomes stranded. Richard's uncle demands that Young return them. Young takes Pauline captive on his ship while Richard is rescued by a battleship and pursues them in a Navy hydroplane. Young wins this race, but Richard goes to his house and rescues the young woman, Young being killed in the fight.

== Cast ==
- Owen Moore as Richard Boyd
- Pauline Garon as Pauline Blake
- Tom Wilson as Sam
- Tôgô Yamamoto as J. Young
- Frank Wunderlee as Captain Ferguson
- Robert Cain as Andrew Dunn
- Nita Naldi as Nita
- Mickey Bennett as Boy

== Production ==
Consistent with the practice at that time, the comic role of the valet Sam was played by Wilson in blackface. The use of white actors in blackface for black character roles in Hollywood films did not begin to decline until the late 1930s, although it is now considered highly offensive.

== Preservation ==
Reported Missing is a lost film with only a fragment remaining.

== Bibliography ==
- Langman, Larry. Destination Hollywood: The Influence of Europeans on American Filmmaking. McFarland & Co., 2000. ISBN 0-7864-0681-X
