= Nancy Steele Is Missing! =

1937 film by George Marshall

- Directed by: George Marshall; Otto Preminger
- Written by: Charles Francis Coe; Gene Fowler; Hal Long
- Produced by: Nunnally Johnson; Darryl F. Zanuck
- Starring: Victor McLaglen; Walter Connolly; Peter Lorre
- Cinematography: Barney McGill
- Edited by: Jack Murray
- Music by: David Buttolph; Cyril J. Mockridge
- Production company: Twentieth Century Fox
- Distributed by: Twentieth Century Fox
- Release date: March 12, 1937
- Running time: 84 minutes
- Country: United States
- Language: English

Nancy Steele Is Missing! is a 1937 American drama film directed by George Marshall and Otto Preminger and starring Victor McLaglen, Walter Connolly and Peter Lorre. It was produced and distributed by Twentieth Century Fox. The film's sets were designed by the British art director Hans Peters. It has been described as a precursor to film noir.

== Plot ==
Danny O'Neill works for munitions manufacturer Michael Steele in the days leading up to World War I. O'Neill kidnaps Steele's infant daughter, hoping the drastic act will keep the country out of war. He leaves the baby with his sister and brother-in-law who believe the baby is his daughter. Soon after, O'Neill is arrested for a series of crimes and is sentenced to 20 years in prison. Once released, he returns to find the girl, now named Sheila, who believes O'Neill to be her father. O'Neill runs into Steele, who offers him a job on his estate. O'Neill has come to care for Sheila and decides to give up his criminal life in order to be a "father" to her. This plan is shattered when O'Neill's former cellmate Sturm shows up and, knowing the truth about the kidnapping, has plans to blackmail O'Neill.

== Cast ==
- Victor McLaglen as Dannie O'Neill
- Walter Connolly as Michael Steele
- Peter Lorre as Prof. Sturm
- June Lang as Sheila O'Neill - aka Nancy Steele
- Robert Kent as Jimmie Wilson
- Shirley Deane as Nancy
- John Carradine as Harry Wilkins
- Jane Darwell as Mrs. Mary Flaherty
- Frank Conroy as Dan Mallon
- Granville Bates as Joseph F.X. Flaherty
- George Taylor as Gus Crowder
- Kane Richmond as Tom - Steele's Chauffeur
- Margaret Fielding as Miss Hunt
- DeWitt Jennings as Doctor on Farm
- George Chandler as Counter Clerk
- George Humbert as Giuseppe Spano
- Edgar Dearing as Detective Flynn

== Bibliography ==
- Grant, Kevin. Roots of Film Noir: Precursors from the Silent Era to the 1940s. McFarland, 2022.
- Thomas, Sarah. Peter Lorre: Face Maker: Constructing Stardom and Performance in Hollywood and Europe. Berghahn Books, 2012.
