= Ida Isabella Poteat =

American painter

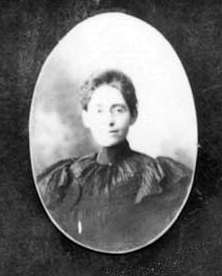
Poteat in 1899

Ida Isabella Poteat (December 15, 1858 – February 1, 1940) was an American artist and instructor.

Poteat was born at Forest Home in Caswell County, North Carolina, near the community of Yanceyville. She was the daughter of James and Julia A. McNeill Poteat; her siblings included William Louis Poteat, Edwin McNeill Poteat, and through her niece Helen she was for a time the aunt-in-law of Laurence Stallings. She was also the great-aunt of professor and philosopher William H. Poteat. Her early education came in local schools before she went to the Raleigh Female Seminary. She then traveled to New York City, studying at the New York School of Fine and Applied Arts and the Cooper Union and having lessons at the School of Applied Design in Philadelphia. She was a private pupil of William Merritt Chase, and also studied with Robert Henri, Charles Parsons, and Louis Mounier during her career. She also spent several summers abroad, studying at various times in London, Florence, Venice, and Carcassonne.

Poteat first worked at the Oxford Seminary in Oxford, North Carolina, but she joined the faculty of the Baptist Female University, today Meredith College, in Raleigh upon its opening on September 27, 1899. She remained there until her death over forty years later. She turned the art department into one of the most highly regarded in the southern United States, modeling its curriculum on those of schools in New York, Philadelphia, and Paris. Among her pupils at Meredith was painter Francis Speight; others include Mary Tillery, Ethel Parrot Hughes, Lucy Sanders Hood, Mrs. Herbert Peele, Heslope Purefoy, Dorothy Horne Decker, and Effie Raye Calhoun Bateman Goff. Poteat designed costumes for the faculty's quadrennial production of Alice in Wonderland; she also designed the university seal, adopted in 1909.

Poteat was a devout member of the Baptist Church. She never married. After her father's death her mother came to live with her; the two would frequently visit her brother William at Wake Forest University during his presidency. On her death she was buried in the family cemetery near Yanceyville.

A portrait of Poteat, done by her pupil Mary Tillery and presented to Meredith College by a group of alumnae in 1938, hung in the dormitory Poteat Hall until 1995, when it was destroyed by vandalism. She was also memorialized with a magnolia tree on campus and with the creation of the Poteat Scholarship. She is among the artists represented in the North Carolina Women Artists Archive at the library of the University of North Carolina at Chapel Hill.
