= M'Lord of the White Road =

1923 film

- Directed by: Arthur Rooke
- Written by: Cedric D. Fraser (novel); Kinchen Wood
- Starring: Victor McLaglen; Marjorie Hume; James Lindsay
- Production company: I.B. Davidson
- Distributed by: Granger Films
- Release date: November 1923
- Country: United Kingdom
- Languages: Silent; English intertitles

M'Lord of the White Road is a 1923 British silent adventure film directed by Arthur Rooke and starring Victor McLaglen, Marjorie Hume and James Lindsay.

== Cast ==
- Victor McLaglen as Lord Annerley / John
- Marjorie Hume as Lady Glorie
- James Lindsay as Sir Humphrey Clayville
- Fred Wright as Master Peter
- Mary Rorke as Lady Collingway
- George Turner as Tom Brown
- Bert Osborne as Greppletight
- Bob Reed as Greenleaf
- Bertie White as Bushworthy
- Harry Newbold as Aylesbury

== Bibliography ==
- Low, Rachael. History of the British Film, 1918-1929. George Allen & Unwin, 1971.
