= Wicked (1931 film) =

1931 film directed by Allan Dwan

- Directed by: Allan Dwan
- Written by: Kenyon Nicholson; Kathryn Scola
- Starring: Elissa Landi; Victor McLaglen; Una Merkel
- Cinematography: J. Peverell Marley
- Edited by: Jack Dennis
- Music by: R.H. Bassett
- Production company: Fox Film Corporation
- Distributed by: Fox Film Corporation
- Release date: October 4, 1931
- Running time: 57 minutes
- Country: United States
- Language: English

Wicked, also known as Condannata in Italy and Malvada in Spain, is a 1931 American pre-Code drama film directed by Allan Dwan and starring Elissa Landi, Victor McLaglen, and Una Merkel. The screenplay concerns a woman who commits murder while trying to save her bandit husband and bears a child in prison. The production dates were between early June and early July 1931.

== Cast ==
- Elissa Landi as Margot Rande
- Victor McLaglen as Scott Burrows
- Una Merkel as June
- Irene Rich as Mrs. Luther
- Alan Dinehart as Blake
- Theodore von Eltz as Rony Rande
- Oscar Apfel as Judge Luther
- Mae Busch as Arlene
- Ruth Donnelly as Fanny
- Eileen Percy as Stella
- Kathleen Kerrigan as Miss Peck
- Alice Lake as Prisoner
- William Pawley as Cop
- G. Pat Collins as Cop
- Clarence Wilson as Juryman
- Edwin Maxwell as Owner of property
- George Kuwa as Tony's friend
- Lloyd Whitlock as Tony's Friend
