= Danger – Love at Work =

1937 film by Otto Preminger

- 1937 US Theatrical Poster
- Directed by: Otto Preminger
- Written by: James Edward Grant; Ben Markson
- Produced by: Harold Wilson
- Starring: Ann Sothern; Jack Haley; Edward Everett Horton
- Cinematography: Virgil Miller
- Edited by: Jack Murray
- Music by: Cyril J. Mockridge
- Production company: 20th Century Fox
- Distributed by: 20th Century Fox
- Release date: September 30, 1937
- Running time: 84 minutes
- Country: United States
- Language: English

Danger – Love at Work is a 1937 American screwball comedy film directed by Otto Preminger and starring Ann Sothern, Jack Haley and Edward Everett Horton. It was produced and distributed by 20th Century Fox. The screenplay by James Edward Grant and Ben Markson focuses on an attorney's frustrating efforts to deal with a wildly eccentric family.

== Plot ==
Henry MacMorrow, a junior partner in the law firm of Parsons, Hilton, Trent and MacMorrow, is assigned the task of obtaining the signatures of various members of the Pemberton family so that a piece of property they own can be sold. While en route by train to the Pemberton home in Aiken, South Carolina, he meets Junior Pemberton, an obnoxious ten-year-old prodigy whose behavior prompts Henry to kick him in the pants when they arrive at the station, much to the dismay of the boy's sister Toni.

Henry arrives at the Pemberton home before Toni and Junior, and the rest of the family mistakes him for her fiancé Howard Rogers. She quickly corrects the misunderstanding and soon finds herself liking the amiable lawyer, despite their unpleasant first meeting. Mistakenly believing the millionaire Henry is impoverished and the sole support of his widowed mother, Toni promises to help him financially, but Howard convinces the family Henry is a fraud. The attorney returns to New York City, where he promptly is fired.

Anxious to find Henry, Toni convinces the Pembertons their town is being quarantined, and the entire family travels to New York. When Toni learns Henry has lost his job, she vows to help him get it back. She urges her family to sign the documents allowing their land to be sold, and then she and Henry go to the country to obtain the signatures of her Aunts Pitty and Patty and Uncle Goliath.

Howard, still certain Henry is a con artist, decides to assess the Pemberton's property and discovers oil, unaware it has leaked from his own car. Believing the land is worth a fortune, he persuades the family to sell it to him for $125,000 and convinces them Henry was trying to scam them. Thinking Henry was deceiving her, Toni ends their relationship.

Howard discovers the oil was from his car and tries to get his money back, only to discover the Pembertons already have spent it. When he decides to sell the land to Henry, Toni tries to warn him, but he refuses to speak to her, until Pitty and Patty reveal Toni and Henry spent the night in their barn, and Toni pretends he took advantage of her. Her family storms Henry's apartment and demands he make an honest woman of her, and he willingly agrees to marry Toni.

== Cast ==
- Ann Sothern as Toni Pemberton
- Jack Haley as Henry MacMorrow
- Edward Everett Horton as Howard Rogers
- Mary Boland as Alice Pemberton
- John Carradine as Herbert Pemberton
- Walter Catlett as Uncle Alan
- Benny Bartlett as Junior Pemberton
- Maurice Cass as Uncle Goliath
- Charles Coleman as Henry's butler
- Margaret Seddon as Aunt Pitty
- Margaret McWade as Aunt Patty

== Production ==
The story by James Edward Grant upon which the screenplay was based borrowed heavily from the hit Pulitzer Prize-winning 1936 play You Can't Take It with You by George S. Kaufman and Moss Hart, as well as Morrie Ryskind and Gregory LaCava's script for My Man Godfrey. 20th Century Fox executive Darryl F. Zanuck originally cast Simone Simon as Southern belle Toni Pemberton, but her heavy French accent proved to be too difficult to understand, and after a few days of filming she was replaced by Ann Sothern.

The film's title song was written by Harry Revel and Mack Gordon.

== Critical reception ==
Ceri Thomas of Channel 4 called the film "a C-grade screwball comedy that's quaintly competent but lacks energy" and added, "Preminger does a workmanlike job on this . . . but doesn't lift the material above the ordinary. He seems happy just to parade this collection of oddball caricatures in front of the lens, content that their cheery wackiness is enough to power the story. Sadly it isn't. There is no urgency or drive to the action to match the snappiness of the dialogue. Even though it runs at less than 80 minutes, the film seems to dawdle."

Time Out London said Preminger "directs efficiently, but with little feeling for screwball form; with hindsight it was hardly his sort of thing. Amiable enough, but, as ever, a little loveable eccentricity goes a very long way."

In reviewing the film for DVD Times, Anthony Nield observed although Preminger "may not have the sense of timing which distinguished the great screwball directors, from Howard Hawks to Preston Sturges, he nonetheless manages a slick, professional job . . . [T]here is something pleasing to come from the knowledge that the director of such twisted efforts as Where the Sidewalk Ends, Bunny Lake is Missing and, indeed, Laura could start out in Hollywood on something so relatively straightforward."

== Home media ==
The British Film Institute released a Region 2 DVD on September 26, 2005. The film is in fullscreen format, with an audio track and subtitles in English.
