= A Devil with Women =

1930 film directed by Irving Cummings

- Directed by: Irving Cummings
- Written by: Henry Johnson; Dudley Nichols
- Produced by: George E. Middleton
- Starring: Victor McLaglen; Mona Maris; Humphrey Bogart
- Cinematography: Al Brick; Arthur L. Todd
- Edited by: Jack Murray
- Distributed by: Fox Film Corporation
- Release date: October 18, 1930 (USA)
- Running time: 64 minutes
- Country: United States
- Language: English

A Devil with Women is a 1930 American pre-Code film starring Victor McLaglen, Mona Maris, and Humphrey Bogart, and directed by Irving Cummings, notable for being among Bogart's earliest large film roles.

== Plot ==
In a Central American country, adventurer Moxton and sidekick Standish find themselves in a fierce competition for a luscious young woman's attentions.

== Cast ==
- Victor McLaglen as Jerry Moxton
- Mona Maris as Rosita Fernandez
- Humphrey Bogart as Tom Standish
- Luana Alcaniz as Dolores
- Michael Vavitch as Morloff
- Soledad Jiménez as Jiminez
- Mona Rico as Alicia
- John St. Polo as Don Diego
- Robert Edeson as General Garcia
- Joe De La Cruz as Juan
