= The Passionate Adventure =

1924 film

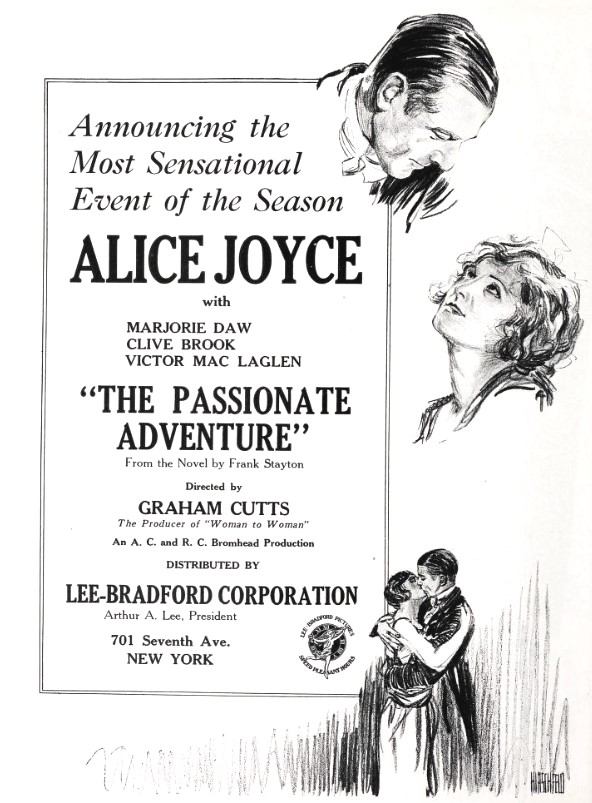
- American advertisement
- Directed by: Graham Cutts
- Written by: Alfred Hitchcock; Michael Morton
- Based on: The Passionate Adventure by Frank Stayton
- Produced by: Michael Balcon
- Starring: Clive Brook; Alice Joyce; Marjorie Daw; Victor McLaglen
- Cinematography: Claude L. McDonnell
- Production company: Gainsborough Pictures
- Distributed by: Gaumont British Distributors
- Release date: July 1924
- Running time: 8 reels
- Country: United Kingdom
- Language: Silent (English intertitles)

The Passionate Adventure is a 1924 British silent drama film directed by Graham Cutts and starring Clive Brook and Alice Joyce. The film was adapted from a novel by Frank Stayton by Alfred Hitchcock and Michael Morton, with Hitchcock also credited as assistant director to Cutts.

The Passionate Adventure is also notable as the first film released under the aegis of Michael Balcon's newly formed Gainsborough Pictures.

== Plot ==
The marriage between Adrian and Drusilla St. Clair has become unsatisfactory and loveless since Adrian's return from World War I, with the couple treating each other with cold distance. Seeking escape from his unfulfilled home life, Adrian takes off to the East End of London where he disguises himself as a shabby itinerant. There he meets a pretty young waif Vicky and takes on the role of her unofficial protector.

This does not go down well with Vicky's East End criminal element boyfriend Herb who becomes increasingly suspicious and jealous about her association with Adrian, until a showdown in inevitable. Adrian uses his wits to overcome Herb's brute force, and hands him over to the police who have wanted him for some time. With Herb in custody and Vicky's safety assured, Adrian returns west to Drusilla invigorated by his East End experience and with his feelings of passion towards her evidently restored. They embrace at the bottom of the staircase, which the appreciative Drusilla starts to climb.

== Cast ==
- Clive Brook as Adrian St. Clair
- Alice Joyce as Drusilla St. Clair
- Marjorie Daw as Vicky
- Victor McLaglen as Herb Harris
- Lillian Hall-Davis as Pamela
- Joseph R. Tozer as Inspector Sladen
- Mary Brough as Lady Rolis
- John F. Hamilton as Bill

== Production ==
It was the third film from Michael Balcon. He raised some of the finance from the Lewis Selznick Company, on the condition that Selznick's son Myron supervised the production. The film was shot at Islington.

== Reception ==
Walter Mycroft, reviewing the film for the Evening Standard, wrote that ‘For absolute skill in production and for inspiration in setting,' The Passionate Adventure 'reaches a high level, far higher than was actually entailed by the particular story Graham Cutts and his coadjutors here had to handle.'

== See also ==
- Alfred Hitchcock filmography
