= Poteat House =

Historic house in North Carolina, United States

- U.S. National Register of Historic Places
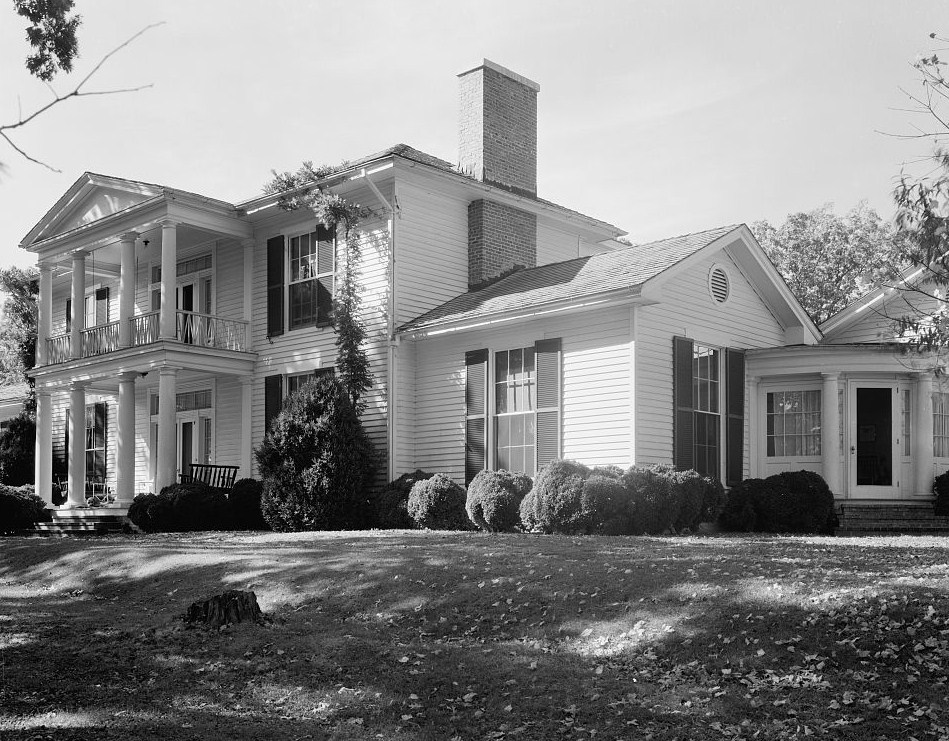
- Poteat House, HABS Photo, 1938

- Location within North Carolina Location within the United States
- Location: N of Yanceyville on NC 62, near Yanceyville, North Carolina
- Coordinates: 36°25′11″N 79°18′37″W
- Area: 619.9 acres (250.9 ha)
- Built: 1855-1856, 1928-1929
- Architectural style: Greek Revival
- NRHP reference No.: 79001688
- Added to NRHP: October 24, 1979

Poteat House, also known as Forest Home, is a historic plantation house located near Yanceyville, Caswell County, North Carolina. It was built in 1855–1856, and consists of a two-story main block, three bays wide, with flanking one-story wings in the Greek Revival style. It has a center hall plan and was restored in 1928–1929 by Helen Poteat and her husband, author and playwright Laurence Stallings. It features a reconstructed double pedimented portico supported by four plain Roman Doric order columns. Also on the property is a contributing small cabin used by enslaved people. The house was the birthplace of painter Ida Isabella Poteat.

It was added to the National Register of Historic Places in 1979.
