= The Isle of Retribution =

1926 film

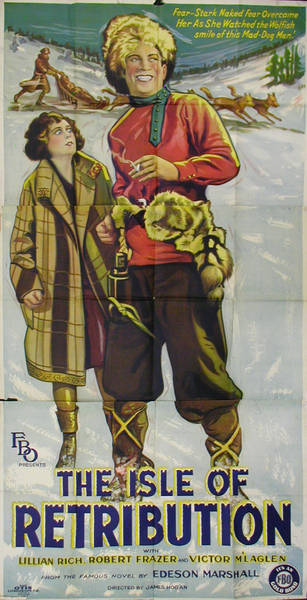
- Film poster
- Directed by: James P. Hogan
- Written by: Fred Myton
- Based on: The Isle of Retribution by Edison Marshall
- Starring: Lillian Rich; Robert Frazer; Victor McLaglen
- Cinematography: Jules Cronjager
- Production company: Robertson-Cole Pictures Corporation
- Distributed by: Film Booking Offices of America
- Release date: April 25, 1926
- Running time: 70 minutes
- Country: United States
- Language: Silent (English intertitles)

The Isle of Retribution is a 1926 American silent adventure film directed by James P. Hogan and starring Lillian Rich, Robert Frazer, and Victor McLaglen. It was based upon the novel of the same name by Edison Marshall.

== Cast ==
- Lillian Rich as Bess Gilbert
- Robert Frazer as Ned Cornet
- Victor McLaglen as Doomsdorf
- Mildred Harris as Lenore Hardenworth
- Kathleen Kirkham as Mrs. Hardenworth – Lenore's Mother
- David Torrence as Godfrey Cornet

== Preservation ==
It is currently a lost film.

== Bibliography ==
- Kenneth White, Munden (1997). The American Film Institute Catalog of Motion Pictures Produced in the United States, Part 1. University of California Press. ISBN 9780520209695.
