= Heartstrings (1923 film) =

1923 film

- Directed by: Edwin Greenwood
- Written by: Elizabeth Gaskell (story); Eliot Stannard
- Produced by: Edward Godal
- Starring: Gertrude McCoy; Victor McLaglen; Russell Thorndike
- Production company: British and Colonial Films
- Distributed by: British and Colonial Films
- Release date: October 1923
- Country: United Kingdom
- Language: English

Heartstrings is a 1923 British silent romance film directed by Edwin Greenwood and starring Gertrude McCoy, Victor McLaglen and Russell Thorndike. It is an adaptation of the 1858 short story The Manchester Marriage by Elizabeth Gaskell.

== Cast ==
- Gertrude McCoy as Norah
- Victor McLaglen as Frank Wilson
- Edith Bishop as Alice Wilson
- Russell Thorndike as Tom Openshaw
- Sydney Fairbrother as Mrs. Chadwick
- George Bishop as Mr. Chadwick
- Kate Gurney as Mrs. Wilson

== Bibliography ==
- Goble, Alan. The Complete Index to Literary Sources in Film. Walter de Gruyter, 1999.
