= The River Pirate =

1928 film

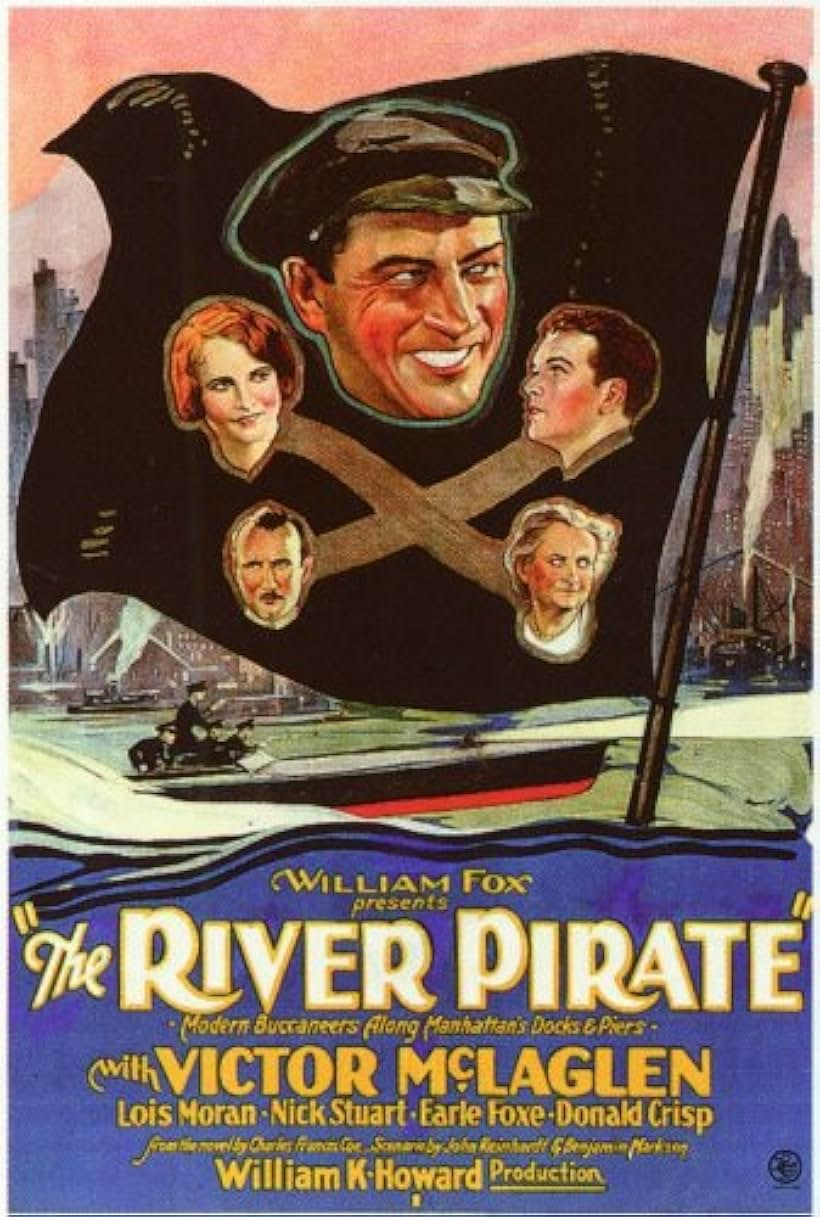
- Theatrical release poster
- Directed by: William K. Howard
- Screenplay by: Malcolm Stuart Boylan; Ben Markson; John Reinhardt
- Starring: Victor McLaglen; Lois Moran; Nick Stuart; Earle Foxe; Donald Crisp; Bob Perry
- Cinematography: Lucien N. Andriot
- Edited by: Jack Dennis
- Production company: Fox Film Corporation
- Distributed by: Fox Film Corporation
- Release date: August 26, 1928
- Running time: 77 minutes
- Country: United States
- Languages: Sound (Synchronized) (English intertitles)

The River Pirate is a 1928 American synchronized sound drama film directed by William K. Howard and written by Malcolm Stuart Boylan, Ben Markson and John Reinhardt, based on the 1928 novel by Charles Francis Coe. While the film has no audible dialog, it was released with a synchronized musical score with sound effects using the sound-on-film Movietone process. An epilogue was added to the end of the film so that it could deceptively be advertised as a "talking" film.

The film stars Victor McLaglen, Lois Moran, Nick Stuart, Earle Foxe, Donald Crisp and Bob Perry. The film was released on August 26, 1928, by Fox Film Corporation.

== Plot ==
Sandy, a scrappy and sympathetic waterfront orphan in Manhattan, finds himself unfairly sentenced to reform school after being caught up in trouble not of his own making. While serving his time, he befriends Sailor Fritz, a hardened convict temporarily assigned to the reformatory to teach sailmaking. Despite Fritz’s past as a notorious warehouse bandit and gunman, the two form a genuine bond built on mutual respect and shared feelings of alienation.

After Fritz is granted parole—thanks in part to his persuasive charm—he promptly returns to his old criminal life. Determined to remain loyal to the only adult who's ever looked out for him, Sandy breaks out of reform school with Fritz’s help and is soon apprenticed into Fritz’s underworld trade: stealing cargo from riverfront warehouses.

Life along the docks takes a turn when Sandy meets Marjorie Cullen, a warm-hearted young woman and ward of police detective Sergeant Caxton. Marjorie sees goodness in Sandy and urges him to abandon his criminal path. Torn between his loyalty to Fritz and his growing affection for Marjorie, Sandy begins to question the life he's fallen into.

Meanwhile, tensions escalate when Fritz’s criminal activities draw the attention of both the police and a rival informer, the sly and conniving Shark. When Fritz is ultimately caught during a loft robbery, he faces a brutal confrontation with Detective Caxton. In a dramatic and unusual moment of mutual honor, the two brawlers discard their weapons and fight hand-to-hand, awakening the next morning in adjacent hospital beds after knocking each other out.

As Fritz returns to prison, Sandy manages to slip away, finally free from his mentor’s influence. With Fritz out of the picture and the guidance of Marjorie, Sandy is given a chance to choose a new future—one rooted in honesty and love.

Epilogue: A novel "Movietone" spoken epilogue is presented at the conclusion of the film. An elderly gentleman in a library closes the book titled "The River Pirate," looks directly at the audience, and philosophically reminds us that while stories may end, real life continues. He then reveals a hopeful postscript—Sailor Fritz was released from prison in time to serve as best man at Sandy and Marjorie's wedding, completing the tale on a warmly sentimental note.

== Cast ==
- Victor McLaglen as Sailor Fritz
- Lois Moran as Marjorie Cullen
- Nick Stuart as Sandy
- Earle Foxe as Shark
- Donald Crisp as Caxton
- Bob Perry as Gerber

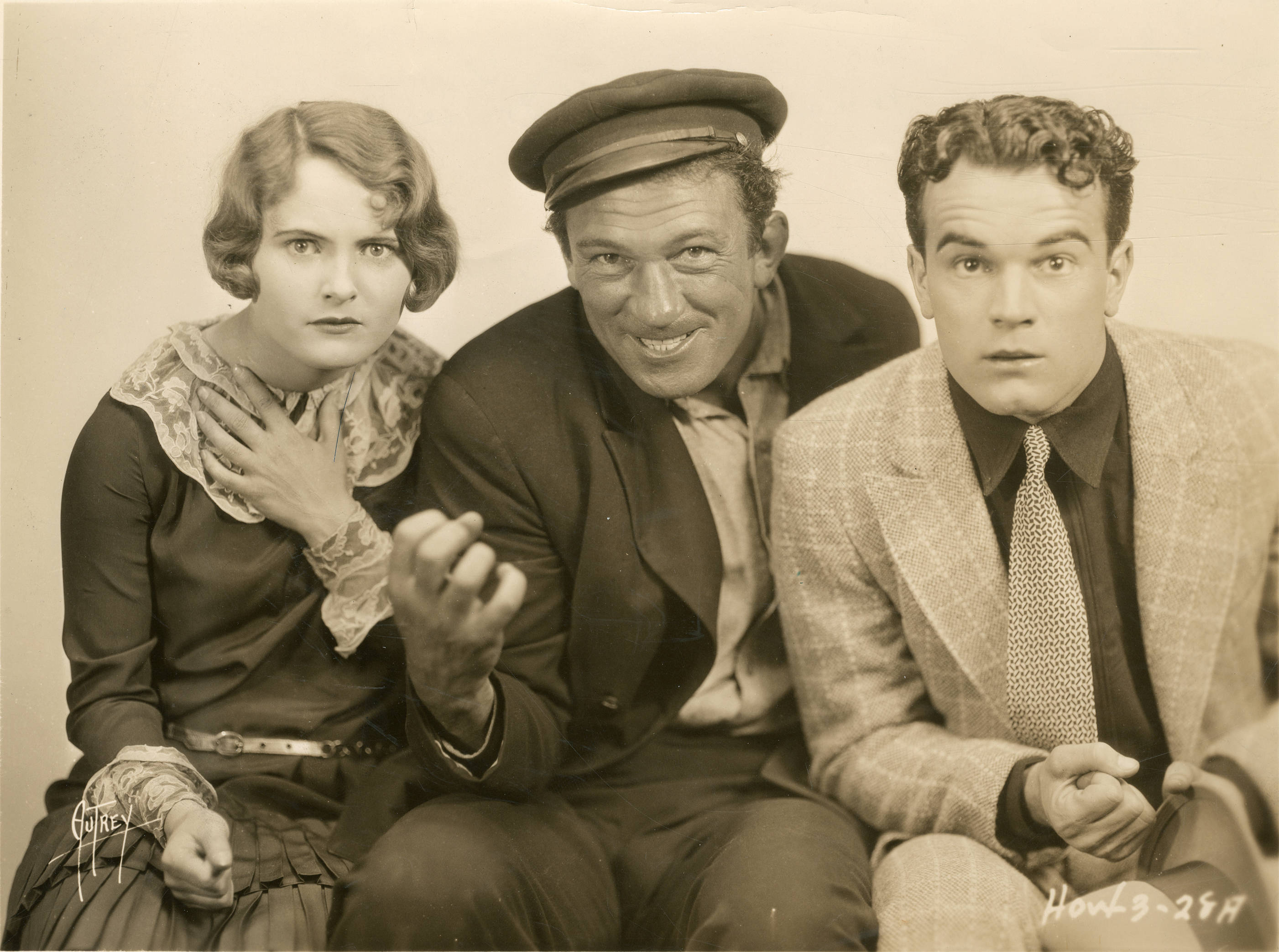
Scene from the movie

== Music ==
The film featured a theme song entitled "The Magic of Your Eyes" which was composed by Arthur A. Penn.

== Preservation ==
A 35mm print of The River Pirate is held by the George Eastman Museum.

== See also ==
- List of early sound feature films (1926–1929)
