= What Price Glory (1926 film) =

1926 film by Raoul Walsh

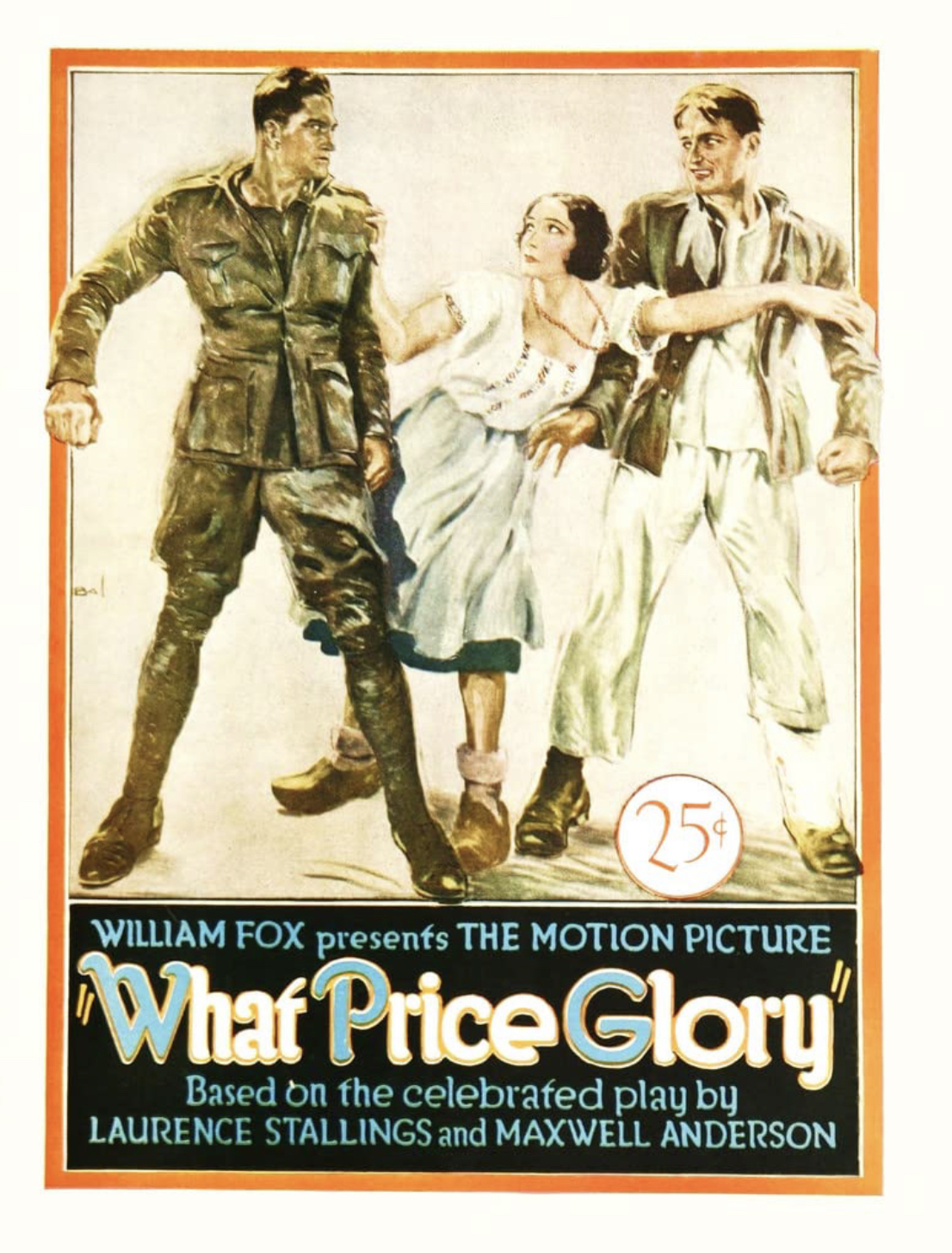
- Directed by: Raoul Walsh
- Written by: James T. O'Donohoe (scenario); Malcolm Stuart Boylan (intertitles)
- Based on: What Price Glory? by Maxwell Anderson and Laurence Stallings
- Produced by: William Fox
- Starring: Victor McLaglen; Edmund Lowe; Dolores del Río; Phyllis Haver
- Cinematography: Barney McGill; John A. Marta; John Smith
- Music by: Ernö Rapée; Lew Pollack
- Distributed by: Fox Film Corporation
- Release dates: November 23, 1926 (Silent version); January 21, 1927 (Sound version)
- Running time: 116 minutes
- Country: United States
- Language: Sound (Synchronized) (English Intertitles)
- Box office: $4 million (U.S. and Canada rentals)

What Price Glory (1926) (Silent version)

What Price Glory is a 1926 American synchronized sound comedy drama war film produced and distributed by Fox Film Corporation and directed by Raoul Walsh. The film was released with a synchronized musical score with sound effects using the Movietone sound system though it contains no audible dialogue. This film is historically significant as it was Fox's first sound film. The film is based on the 1924 play What Price Glory by Maxwell Anderson and Laurence Stallings and was remade in 1952 as What Price Glory starring James Cagney. Malcolm Stuart Boylan, founder of the U.S. Coast Guard Auxiliary, was title writer on the Fox attraction. The film is preserved in full with its original sound-on-film elements at the George Eastman Museum.

== Plot ==
Flagg and Quirt are veteran United States Marines whose rivalry dates back a number of years. Flagg is commissioned a captain, he is in command of a company on the front lines of France during World War I. Sergeant Quirt is assigned to Flagg's unit as the senior non-commissioned officer. Flagg and Quirt quickly resume their rivalry, which this time takes its form over the affections of Charmaine, the daughter of the local innkeeper. However, Charmaine's desire for a husband and the reality of war give the two men a common cause.

== Cast ==
- Edmund Lowe as 1st Sergeant Quirt
- Victor McLaglen as Captain Flagg
- Dolores del Río as Charmaine de la Cognac
- William V. Mong as Cognac Pete
- Phyllis Haver as Shanghai Mabel
- Elena Jurado as Carmen, Philippine girl
- Leslie Fenton as Lieutenant Moore
- Barry Norton as Private 'Mother's Boy' Lewisohn
- Sammy Cohen as Private Lipinsky
- Ted McNamara as Private Kiper
- August Tollaire as French Mayor
- Mathilde Comont as Camille, fat lady
- Patrick Rooney as Mulcahy (billed as Pat Rooney)
- J. Carrol Naish as French Soldier

== Production ==
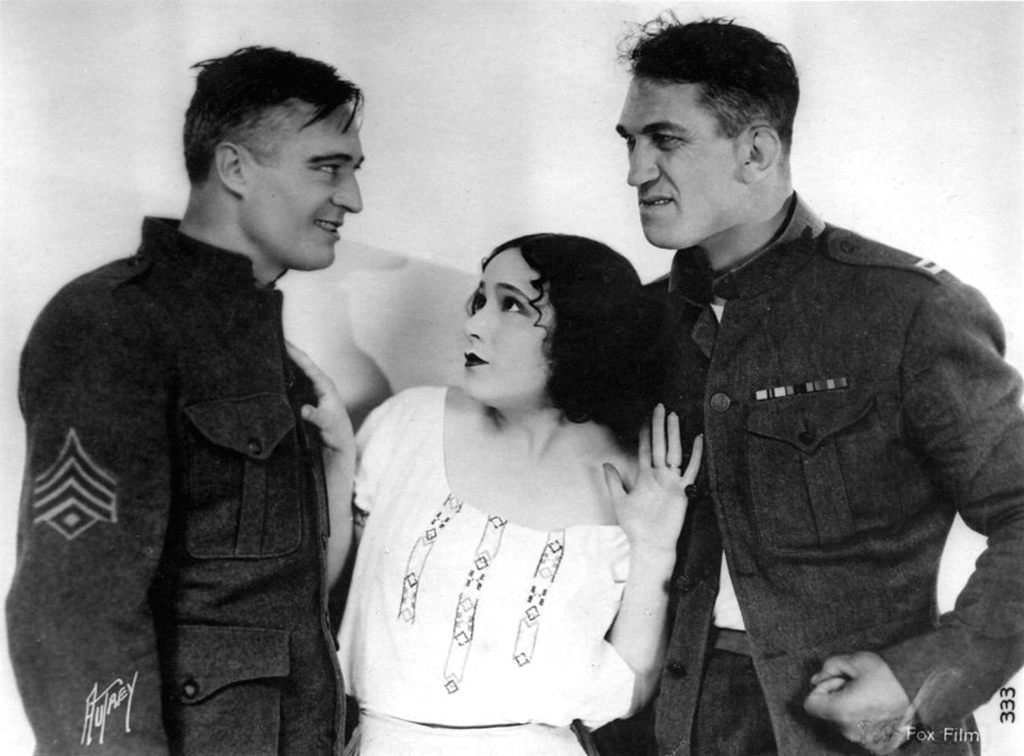
Edmund Lowe, Dolores del Río and Victor McLaglen in What Price Glory

Fox acquired the film rights to the play What Price Glory? for $100,000.

The film was directed by Raoul Walsh and released as a silent film by Fox Film Corporation on November 23, 1926, in the US, and had a 116-minute running time. On January 21, 1927, a short film of singer Raquel Meller was shown before this feature at the Sam H. Harris Theater in New York City. The short film, not quite synchronized, was the first public presentation of a film in the Fox Movietone sound-on-film system. On January 21, 1927, Fox re-released What Price Glory with synchronized sound effects and music in the Movietone system.

Part of its fame revolves around the fact that the characters can be seen speaking profanities which are not reflected in the intertitles, but which can be deciphered by lipreaders. However, the production by Arthur Hopkins of the Anderson and Stallings play had featured audible profanities, and its program featured the statement that "'What Price Glory' is a play about war as it is, not as it has been presented theatrically for thousands of years. The soldiers in 'What Price Glory' talk and act as much as soldiers talk and act the world over. The speech of men under arms is interlarded with profanity. Oaths mean nothing to a soldier but a means to obtain emphasis."

The studio was reportedly inundated by calls and letters from enraged Americans, including deaf and hearing impaired people, to whom the vivid profanity between Sergeant Quirt and Captain Flagg was extremely offensive.

In the 1924 Broadway play the roles of Captain Flagg and Sgt. Quirt were played by Louis Wolheim, fresh from his triumph in Eugene O'Neill's The Hairy Ape and William "Stage" Boyd. Curiously Wolheim and the younger William Boyd would play characters similar to Quirt and Flagg in the 1927 film Two Arabian Knights.

Although the title is sometimes listed as having a question mark, the Movietone version has simply 'WHAT PRICE GLORY', as does at least one silent trailer as well as some of the posters.

In his autobiography, Peter Cushing claimed his wife, Violet Hélène Beck Cushing, was part of the cast prior to their marriage.

Composers Ernö Rapée and Lew Pollack collaborated on the popular song "Charmaine" for the film, named after the character of Charmaine de la Cognac.

== Adaptation ==
McLaglen and Lowe reprised their roles from the movie in the radio program Captain Flagg and Sergeant Quirt, broadcast on the Blue Network September 28, 1941 – January 25, 1942, and on NBC February 13, 1942 – April 3, 1942.

== Sequels ==
- The Cock-Eyed World (1929) (directed by Raoul Walsh)
- Women of All Nations (1931) (directed by Raoul Walsh)
- The Stolen Jools (1931) (cameo)
- Hot Pepper (1933)

Lowe and McLaglen played two similar Marines in the RKO Radio Pictures film Call Out the Marines (1942).

== See also ==
- List of early sound feature films (1926–1929)
- 6th Marine Regiment - Flagg receives orders addressed "C.C. 79 Co. 6 Regt."
