= Laurence Stallings =

American writer

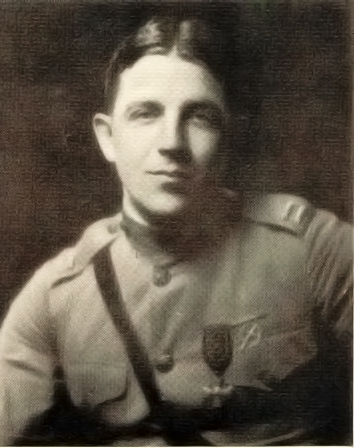
- Stallings c. 1918. Photo by Arnold Genthe. Note the Croix de Guerre.
- Born: Laurence Tucker Stallings; November 25, 1894; Macon, Georgia
- Died: February 28, 1968 (aged 73); Pacific Palisades, California
- Occupations: Playwright; novelist; screenwriter
- Spouses: Helen Purefoy Poteat; Louise St. Leger Vance
- Writing career
- Notable works: Plumes; What Price Glory
- Notable awards: Croix de Guerre; Silver Star; Photoplay Gold Medal • The Big Parade (1925)

Laurence Tucker Stallings (November 25, 1894 – February 28, 1968) was an American playwright, screenwriter, lyricist, literary critic, journalist, novelist, and photographer. Best known for his collaboration with Maxwell Anderson on the 1924 play What Price Glory, Stallings also produced a groundbreaking autobiographical novel, Plumes, about his service in World War I, and published an award-winning book of photographs, The First World War: A Photographic History.

== Life ==
Stallings was born in Macon, Georgia, to Larkin Tucker Stallings, a bank clerk, and Aurora Brooks Stallings, a homemaker and avid reader who inspired her son's love of literature. He entered Wake Forest University in North Carolina in 1912 and became the editor of the campus literary magazine, the Old Gold and Black.

He met Helen Poteat while at Wake Forest. She was the daughter of Dr. William Louis Poteat, the university president, and the sister of Stallings's classics professor. They were sweethearts throughout their school years. He graduated from Wake Forest College in 1916, and got a job writing advertising copy for a local recruiting office. He was so convinced by his own prose, he joined the United States Marine Reserve in 1917. He left Philadelphia for overseas duty in France aboard the USS Henderson on 24 April 1918. In France, he served as a platoon commander with 3rd Battalion, 5th Marines during the fighting at Château-Thierry. He was wounded in the leg in the Battle of Belleau Wood after charging an enemy machine-gun nest on 25 June. After begging the doctors not to amputate, he went home to spend two painful years recuperating at the Brooklyn Naval Hospital. He later damaged his leg in a fall on the ice, and it was amputated in 1922. Many years later, he had to have his remaining leg amputated, as well. After finishing his convalescence, Stallings and Poteat married on March 8, 1919; they had two daughters, Sylvia (born 1926) and Diana (born 1931), before divorcing in 1936. In 1928–1929, they restored Poteat House near Yanceyville, North Carolina. Through Helen his aunt by marriage was the painter Ida Isabella Poteat.

The year following his divorce, Stallings married Louise St. Leger Vance, his secretary at Fox Studios. They had two children, Laurence Jr. (born 1939, died 2023 in Tübingen, Germany) and Sally (born 1941). Stallings died of a heart attack in Pacific Palisades, California. He was buried with full military honors at Fort Rosecrans National Cemetery in Point Loma near San Diego.

== Career ==
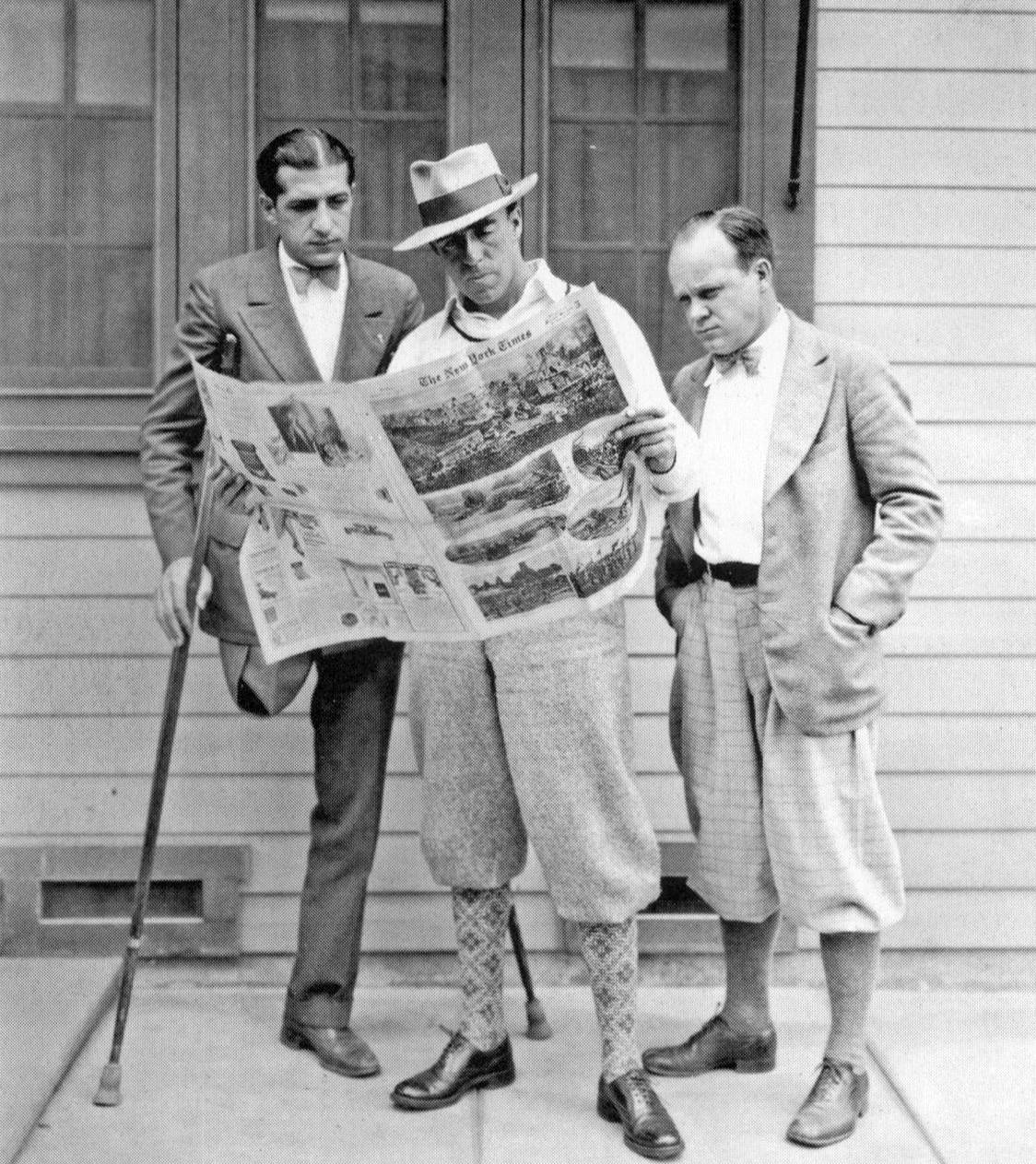
Stallings and American film artist Raoul Walsh, director of the film version of What Price Glory, 1926.

Stallings received a Master of Science degree from Georgetown University, after which he worked as a reporter, critic, and entertainment editor at the New York World. He was impressed by Maxwell Anderson's first play, White Desert, and the two joined forces to collaborate on What Price Glory, which opened at the Plymouth Theatre in New York City in 1924. The critically acclaimed play ran for 435 performances and spawned two film adaptations.

The two went on to co-write the plays The First Flight and The Buccaneer, both in 1925. Stallings continued his theatre career with the book and lyrics for the musical Deep River (1926), adapted Ernest Hemingway's novel A Farewell to Arms for the stage in 1930, co-wrote the book for the musicals Rainbow (1928) with Oscar Hammerstein, and Virginia (1937) with Owen Davis, and penned the play The Streets Are Guarded in 1944.

He was a member of the Algonquin Round Table.

Stallings' novel, the autobiographical Plumes, was published in 1924 and was a success, with nine printings by 1925. It depicts Richard Plume, a veteran with a missing leg, attempting to adapt to society after the war. It was adapted into King Vidor's The Big Parade the following year, which was extremely successful and remained MGM's largest-grossing film until Gone with the Wind in 1939. He was regarded as a key influence on three of director John Ford's films, serving as writer or co-writer for 3 Godfathers (1948) with John Wayne and Pedro Armendariz, She Wore a Yellow Ribbon (1949), and The Sun Shines Bright (1953). Additional screenwriting credits included Northwest Passage (1940) with Spencer Tracy, The Man from Dakota (1940) with Wallace Beery and Delores del Rio, and On Our Merry Way (1948) with James Stewart and Henry Fonda.

Stallings's last book, The Doughboys: The Story of the AEF, 1917–1918, was published in 1963. The nonfiction account of World War I partly explores the racism and discrimination faced by the black troops during the war.

Stallings was recalled up to service with the U.S. Marine Corps during World War II as a lieutenant colonel, but did not serve overseas.

== Bibliography ==
=== Books ===
- Plumes, 1924
- Three American Plays, by Stallings and Maxwell Anderson (includes What Price Glory, First Flight, and The Buccaneer), 1926
- The First World War—A Photographic History, (edited by Stallings), 1933
- The Doughboys, 1963

=== Essays and reporting ===
- "Celluloid Psychology," New Republic, 33 (7 February 1923): 282–284
- "The Whole Art of a Wooden Leg," Smart Set, 70 (March 1923): 107–111
- "The Big Parade," New Republic, 40 (17 September 1924): 66–69
- "How a 'Great' Play Is Written," Current Opinion, 77 (November 1924): 617–618
- "Esprit de Corps," Scribner's, 84 (August 1928): 212–215
- "Turn Out the Guard," Saturday Evening Post, 201 (13 October 1928): 16–17, 96, 99–100
- "Gentleman in Blue," Saturday Evening Post, 204 (20 February 1932): 8–9, 95
- "Return to the Woods," Collier's, 89 (5 March 1932): 30–31, 52
- "Lt. Richard Plume Comes Home from the War," Scholastic, 25 (10 November 1934): 4–6
- "Bush Brigades and Blackamoors," American Mercury, 37 (April 1936): 411–419
- Stallings, Laurence (1953). "The real Ingrid Bergman story". In Birmingham, Frederic A. (ed.). The girls from Esquire. London: Arthur Barker. pp. 170–175.
- "The War to End War," American Heritage, 10 (October 1959): 4–17, 84–85
- "Bloody Belleau Wood," American Heritage, 14 (June 1963): 65–77

== Dramatic works ==
Theatre productions

- What Price Glory, by Stallings and Maxwell Anderson, New York, Plymouth Theatre, 5 September 1924
- First Flight, by Stallings and Anderson, New York, Plymouth Theatre, 17 September 1925
- The Buccaneer, by Stallings and Anderson, New York, Plymouth Theatre, 2 October 1925
- Deep River, New York, Imperial Theatre, 4 October 1926
- Rainbow, by Stallings and Oscar Hammerstein II, New York, Gallo Theatre, 21 November 1928
- A Farewell to Arms, New York, National Theatre, 22 September 1930
- Eldorado, by Stallings and George S. Kaufman, New Haven, 19 October 1931
- Virginia, by Stallings and Owen Davis, New York, Center Theatre, 2 September 1937
- The Streets Are Guarded, New York, Miller's Theatre, 20 November 1944

Screenplays

- The Big Parade (M-G-M, 1925), story
- Old Ironsides (Paramount Famous Lasky, 1926), story
- Show People (M-G-M, 1928), treatment by Stallings and Agnes Christine Johnston
- Billy the Kid (M-G-M, 1930), dialogue
- Way for a Sailor (M-G-M, 1930), scenario and dialogue by Stallings and W. L. Rivers
- After Office Hours (M-G-M, 1935), story by Stallings and Dale Van Eveky
- So Red the Rose (Paramount, 1935), screenplay by Stallings, Edwin Justus Mayer, and Maxwell Anderson
- Too Hot to Handle (M-G-M, 1938), screenplay by Stallings, John Lee Mahin, and Len Hammond
- Stand Up and Fight (M-G-M, 1939), additional dialogue
- The Man from Dakota (M-G-M, 1940), screenplay
- Northwest Passage (MGM, 1940), screenplay by Stallings and Talbot Jennings
- The Jungle Book (United Artists, 1942), screenplay
- Salome, Where She Danced (Universal, 1945), screenplay
- Christmas Eve (United Artists, 1947), story by Stallings, Arch Oboler, and Richard H. Landau; screenplay; retitled Sinners' Holiday
- A Miracle Can Happen (United Artists, 1948), screenplay by Stallings and Lou Breslow; retitled On Our Merry Way
- 3 Godfathers (MGM, 1949), screenplay by Stallings and Frank Nugent
- She Wore a Yellow Ribbon (RKO, 1949), screenplay by Stallings and Nugent
- The Sun Shines Bright (Republic, 1954), screenplay
