= Here Comes the Navy =

1934 romantic comedy film directed by Lloyd Bacon

- Original film poster
- Directed by: Lloyd Bacon
- Written by: Earl Baldwin; Ben Markson
- Produced by: Louis F. Edelman
- Starring: James Cagney; Pat O'Brien; Gloria Stuart
- Cinematography: Arthur Edeson
- Edited by: George Amy
- Music by: Charles A. Zimmerman
- Production company: Warner Bros. Pictures
- Distributed by: Warner Bros. Pictures
- Release date: July 21, 1934
- Running time: 87 minutes
- Country: United States
- Language: English
- Budget: $263,000
- Box office: $1,758,000

Here Comes the Navy (also known as Hey, Sailor) is a 1934 American romantic comedy film written by Earl Baldwin and Ben Markson and directed by Lloyd Bacon. The film stars James Cagney, Pat O'Brien, Gloria Stuart and Frank McHugh.

== Plot ==
Riveter "Chesty" O'Connor and his best friend "Droopy" join the US Navy to annoy O'Connor's nemesis, Chief Petty Officer "Biff" Martin. O'Connor gets himself court-martialed for being AWOL while visiting Martin's sister Dorothy. Disgruntled at his treatment, O'Connor angrily derides the Navy and finds himself ostracized by his fellow sailors in the USS Arizona.

During gunnery practice, O'Connor puts out a fire in a 14-inch gun turret and receives the Navy Cross medal, but is still determined to get out of the Navy. Later, O'Connor transfers to the US Naval Air Service and is assigned to the rigid airship USS Macon. When the Macon tries to dock, Chief Martin is accidentally caught on a guide rope and is hoisted into the air. (Note: The incident mirrored other accidents with ground crew being hoisted up when airships had mooring problems.) Despite orders, O'Connor climbs down the rope and saves Martin's life by parachuting both of them to the ground.

Later, at the wedding of O'Connor to Dorothy, Martin finds out that O'Connor has been promoted to warrant boatswain and now outranks him.

== Cast ==
- James Cagney as Chester "Chesty" O'Connor
- Pat O'Brien as Chief Petty Officer William "Biff" Martin
- Gloria Stuart as Dorothy "Dot" Martin
- Frank McHugh as Wilbur "Droopy" Mullins
- Dorothy Tree as Gladys
- Willard Robertson as Lieutenant Commander
- Eddie Acuff as Marine Orderly
- George Irving as Admiral
- Sam McDaniel as Porter
- Fred "Snowflake" Toones as Sailor
- Niles Welch as Officer
- Leo White as Professor
- Howard Hickman as Captain
- Chuck Hamilton as Hood at Dance
- Eddy Chandler as Supply Sergeant
- Joseph Crehan as Recruiting Officer
- Ida Darling as Aunt
- Edward Earle as Navy Chaplain
- Maude Eburne as Droopy's Ma
- Robert Emmett as Tansey

== Production ==
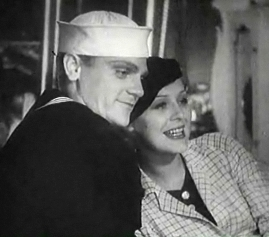
Cagney with Stuart

With the full cooperation of the US Navy, principal photography, which ended early May 1934, took place at a number of naval facilities, including on the USS Arizona, Moffett Field, the dirigible field in Sunnyvale, California, the Naval Training Station in San Diego, California, the Bremerton Navy yard, at Bremerton, Washington, as well as other locations in San Pedro, California, and Sunnyvale, California. Naval personnel made up many of the extras on the film. Of historical interest is that a portion of the filming of Here Comes the Navy took place aboard the battleship Arizona, which was sunk by the Japanese on December 7, 1941, at Pearl Harbor. Further, portions of the film also include shots of the dirigible Macon a year before the accident that destroyed the airship with the loss of two crew.

== Reception ==
In his review for The New York Times, film critic Frank Nugent described Here Comes the Navy as another of the films in "traditional Cagneyesque manner." "Some of the heartiest laughs of the current cinema season were recorded last night in the Strand Theatre, where "Here Comes the Navy" had its metropolitan première. A fast-moving comedy enriched by an authentic naval setting, this Warner production has the added advantage, in these parlous times, of being beyond censorial reproach."

Here Comes the Navy was nominated for the Academy Award for Best Picture.

=== Box office ===
According to Warner Bros records the film earned $1,183,000 domestically and $575,000 internationally.
