= Victor McLaglen =

British-American actor and boxer (1886–1959)

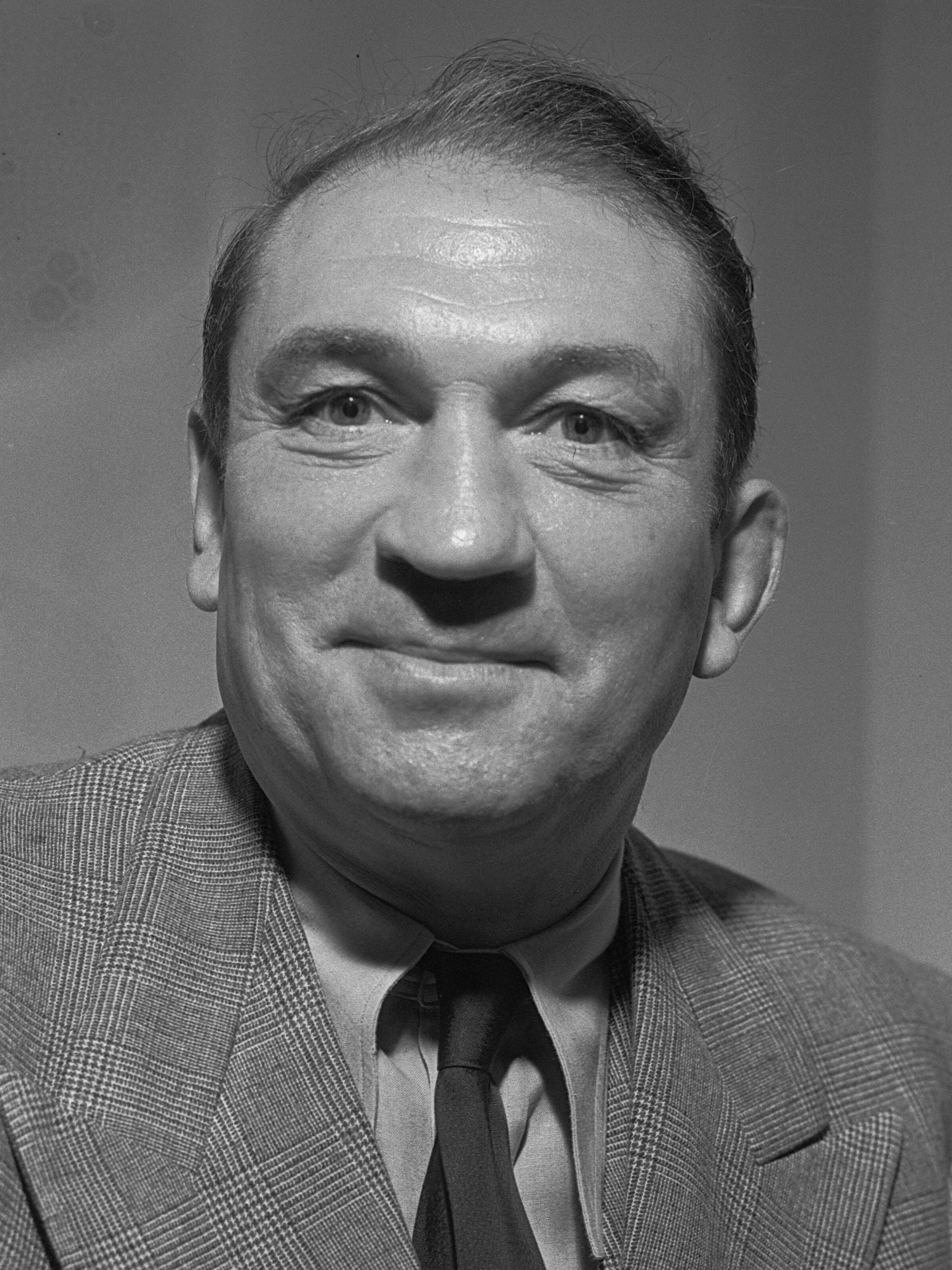
- McLaglen in 1935
- Born: Victor Andrew de Bier Everleigh McLaglen; 10 December 1886; Stepney, East London, U.K.
- Died: 7 November 1959 (aged 72); Newport Beach, California, U.S.
- Burial place: Forest Lawn Memorial Park Cemetery, Glendale, California
- Citizenship: United Kingdom; United States
- Occupations: Actor; boxer
- Years active: 1920–1959
- Spouses: Enid Lamont (m. 1919; died 1942) Suzanne M. Brueggeman (m. 1943; div. 1948) Margaret Pumphrey (m. 1948)
- Children: 3, including Andrew

Victor Andrew de Bier Everleigh McLaglen (10 December 1886 – 7 November 1959) was a British-American actor and boxer. His film career spanned from the early 1920s through the 1950s, initially as a leading man, though he was better known for his character acting. He was a well-known member of John Ford’s Stock Company, appearing in 12 of the director’s films, seven of which co-starred John Wayne.

For his performance as a treacherous Irish Republican in the 1935 film The Informer, he won the Academy Award for Best Actor, and was nominated for Best Supporting Actor for his role in The Quiet Man, both directed by Ford. In 1960, he was posthumously given a star on the Hollywood Walk of Fame.

== Early life and education ==
McLaglen claimed to have been born in Tunbridge Wells, Kent, although his birth certificate records 505 Commercial Road, Stepney in the East End of London as his true birthplace. His father, Andrew Charles Albert Mclaglen, was a missionary in the Free Protestant Church in South Africa, and was later a bishop of the Free Protestant Episcopal Church of England.

The McLaglen family is ultimately of Scottish origin, descended from a MacLachlan who settled in South Africa in the 19th century. The name was rendered into McLaglen from Dutch pronunciation. A.C.A. McLaglen was christened Andries Carel Albertus McLaglen in Cape Town on 4 April 1851.

Victor had eight brothers and a sister. Four of his brothers also became actors: Arthur, an actor and sculptor, and Clifford, Cyril, and Kenneth.

His other siblings included Frederick, Lewis, and a sister, Lily. Another brother, Sydney Temple Leopold McLaglen, who appeared in one film, gained notoriety prior to World War I as a showman and self-proclaimed world jujutsu champion, who authored a book on the subject.

Victor moved with his family to South Africa for a time, where his father was Bishop of Claremont.

== Army service and boxing career ==
McLaglen left home at 14 to join the British Army with the intention of fighting in the Second Boer War, but much to his chagrin, he was stationed at Windsor Castle in the Life Guards and was later forced to leave the army when his true age was discovered.

Four years later, he moved to Winnipeg, Manitoba, Canada, where he became a local celebrity, earning a living as a wrestler and heavyweight boxer, with several notable wins in the ring. He also briefly served as a constable in the Winnipeg Police Force in 1907.

One of his most famous fights was against heavyweight champion Jack Johnson in a six-round exhibition bout at the Vancouver Athletic Club on 10 March 1909. This was Johnson's first bout since winning the heavyweight title from Tommy Burns. Between bouts, McLaglen toured with a circus, which offered $25 to anyone who could go three rounds with him.

He returned to Britain in 1913, and during the First World War was commissioned as a second lieutenant in the 10th Battalion, Middlesex Regiment, on 19 June 1915. He landed at Basra on 10 August 1916 and served as an assistant provost marshal in Mesopotamia, ending the war as a temporary captain. (He may also have seen some service with the Royal Irish Fusiliers.) He continued boxing, and was named heavyweight champion of the British Army in 1918.

After the war, he continued boxing, including a defeat at the hands of British champion Frank Goddard. His final fight was a loss by knockout to Arthur Townley in October 1920. He finished his professional career with a record of 16 wins, eight losses, and a draw.

== Acting career ==
=== Britain ===
McLaglen was visiting a sporting club when spotted by a film producer who was looking for a boxer to play the lead in a film, The Call of the Road (1920). Although McLaglen had never acted before, he auditioned and got the part.

He was in the adventure films: Corinthian Jack (1921) and The Prey of the Dragon (1921). He followed it with The Sport of Kings (1921). Donald Crisp cast him in The Glorious Adventure (1922) and he was in A Romance of Old Baghdad (1922), Little Brother of God (1922), A Sailor Tramp (1922), The Crimson Circle (1922), The Romany (1922), and Heartstrings (1922).

McLaglen played leads in M'Lord of the White Road (1923), In the Blood (1923), The Boatswain's Mate (1923), Women and Diamonds (1924), and The Gay Corinthian (1924). He was in The Passionate Adventure (1924), co-written by Alfred Hitchcock, and The Beloved Brute (1924), The Hunted Woman (1925), and Percy (1925).

=== Hollywood ===
McLaglen's career took a surprise turn in 1925 when he moved to Hollywood. He became a popular character actor, with a particular knack for playing drunks. He also usually played Irishmen, leading many film fans to mistakenly assume he was Irish rather than English. McLaglen played one of the titular characters of The Unholy Three (1925) in Lon Chaney Sr.'s original silent version of the macabre crime drama.

McLaglen had a support part in Winds of Chance (1925), directed by Frank Lloyd, then made The Fighting Heart (1925) at Fox, directed by John Ford. Ford would have a major impact on McLaglen's career. McLaglen was in The Isle of Retribution (1925), Men of Steel (1926), and Beau Geste (1926), playing Hank in the last.

=== What Price Glory? and stardom ===
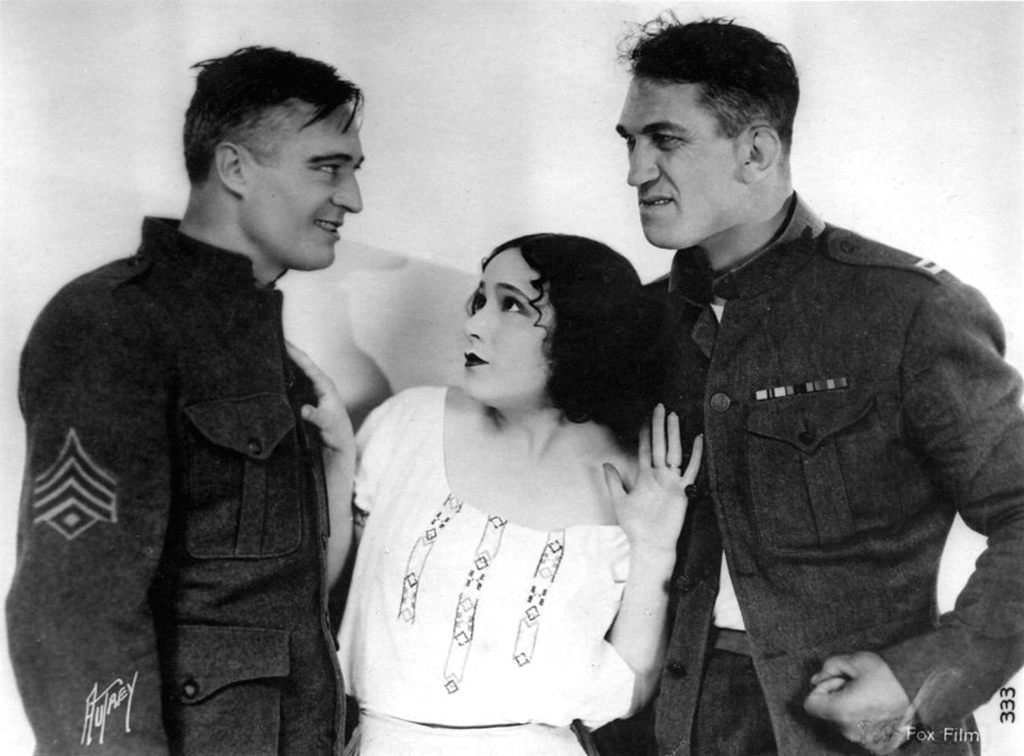
Edmund Lowe, Dolores del Río, and McLaglen in What Price Glory? (1926)

McLaglen was the top-billed leading man in director Raoul Walsh's First World War classic What Price Glory? (1926) with Edmund Lowe and Dolores del Río. The film was a huge success, making over $2 million, and Fox signed McLaglen to a long-term contract.

Fox put McLaglen in The Loves of Carmen (1927) with del Río, directed by Walsh. He was top-billed in Mother Machree (1928), directed by Ford. He was top-billed in A Girl in Every Port (1928), co-starring Robert Armstrong and Louise Brooks. He starred in Hangman's House (1928) for Ford, a romantic drama set in Ireland, and The River Pirate (1928), and Captain Lash (1929). McLaglen then made two films for Ford: Strong Boy (1929) and The Black Watch (1929).

=== Talking movies ===
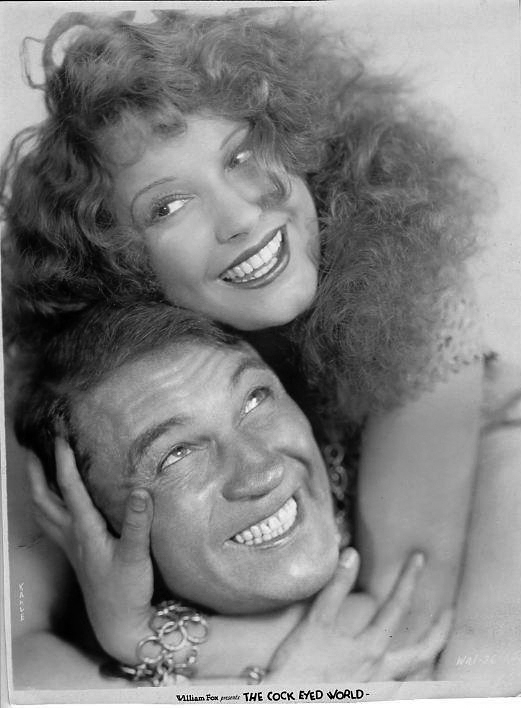
With Lili Damita in The Cock-Eyed World (1929), an early talkie

McLaglen was one of many Fox stars who had cameos in the musical Happy Days (1929). He was reunited with Edmund Lowe and Raoul Walsh in a sequel to What Price Glory?, The Cock-Eyed World (1929), which was another huge success at the box office.

McLaglen made a musical with Walsh, Hot for Paris (1930), then made On the Level (1930). A Devil with Women (1931) was a buddy comedy with Humphrey Bogart in which Bogart played McLaglen's sidekick. He was borrowed by Paramount for Dishonored (1931), starring Marlene Dietrich and directed by Joseph von Sternberg. He was in Not Exactly Gentlemen (1931) and had a cameo in the short film The Stolen Jools (1931). McLaglen, Lowe, and Walsh reunited for a second sequel to What Price Glory?, Women of All Nations (1931). He was in Annabelle's Affairs (1931), Wicked (1931), The Gay Caballero (1932), and Devil's Lottery (1932). McLaglen and Lowe went to Paramount for Guilty as Hell (1932).

Back at Fox, he was in Rackety Rax (1932) then made a fourth What Price Glory? film with Lowe, Hot Pepper (1933). McLaglen starred in Laughing at Life (1933) and returned to Britain to make Dick Turpin (1933).

McLaglen starred opposite Boris Karloff's crazed religious fanatic in John Ford's The Lost Patrol (1934) at RKO, a picture about desperate soldiers gradually losing their minds fighting Arabs in the desert of what is now Iraq.

At Paramount, McLaglen and Lowe were in No More Women (1934) (a non-What Price Glory? film), then McLaglen made Wharf Angel (1934). He was one of many stars in Murder at the Vanities (1934). At Columbia, McLaglen starred in The Captain Hates the Sea (1934) with John Gilbert. Lowe and he reunited at Fox for Under Pressure (1935) (directed by Walsh) and The Great Hotel Murder (1935).

=== The Informer ===
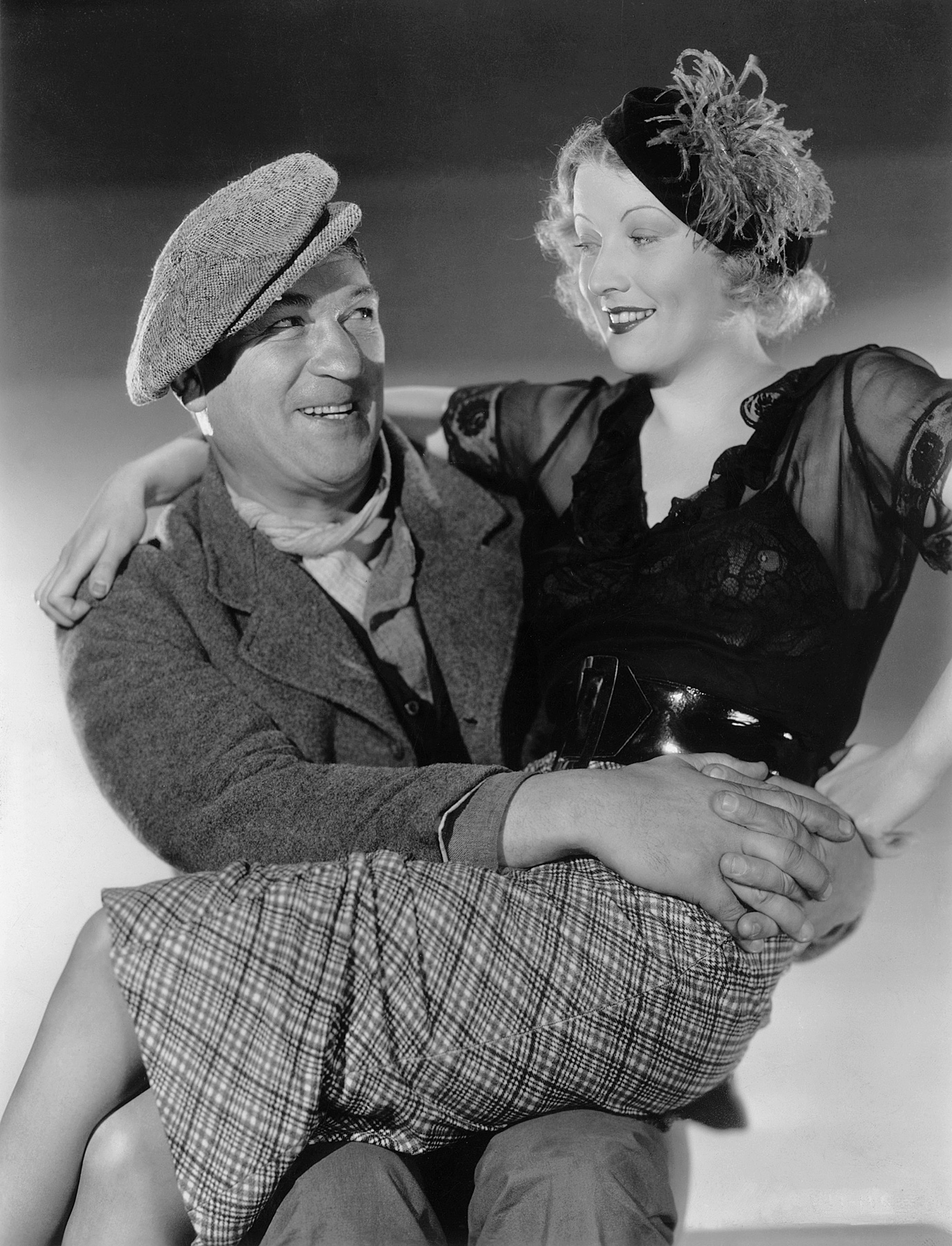
With Margot Grahame in The Informer (1935)

Another highlight of his career was winning an Academy Award for Best Actor for his role in Ford's The Informer (1935), shot at RKO, based on a novel of the same name by Liam O'Flaherty. In 1945, McLaglen said that winning the Oscar had no economic benefit and that he did not know where it was because his son had taken it to college for use as a paperweight.

Back at Fox – now 20th Century Fox – McLaglen made Professional Soldier (1935) with Freddie Bartholomew. At Paramount, he was teamed with Mae West in Klondike Annie (1936), then he went back to Fox for Under Two Flags (1936) with Rosalind Russell and Ronald Colman.

McLaglen starred in The Magnificent Brute (1936) for Universal, Sea Devils (1937) for RKO, and Nancy Steele Is Missing! (1937) for Fox. He stayed at Fox to support Robert Taylor in This Is My Affair (1937), and notably, Shirley Temple in Wee Willie Winkie (1937) directed by John Ford at Fox. He had a cameo in Ali Baba Goes to Town (1937). Brian Donlevy and he made a comedy Battle of Broadway (1938) at Fox, then he went to Universal for The Devil's Party (1938).

=== Gunga Din ===
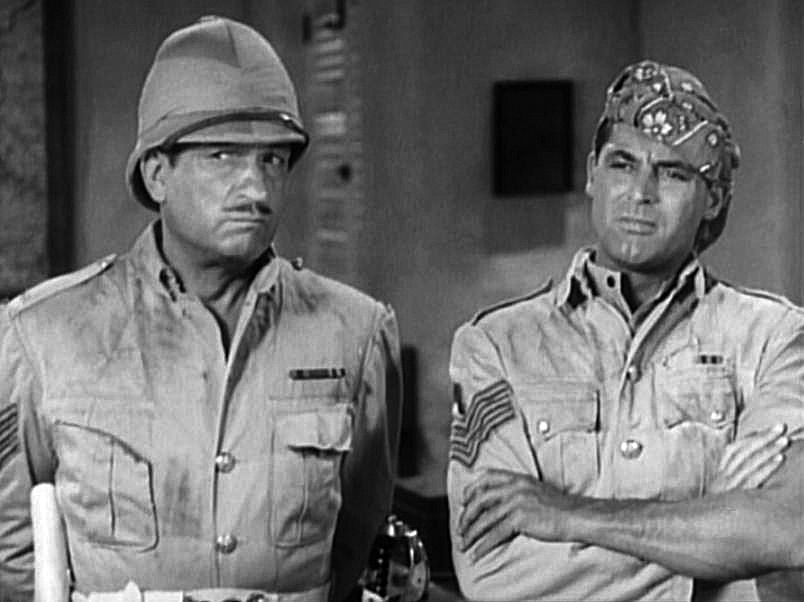
McLaglen and Cary Grant in Gunga Din (1939)

McLaglen returned to Britain for We're Going to Be Rich (1938) with Gracie Fields. Back in Hollywood, he did some films for RKO: Pacific Liner (1939) and Gunga Din (1939). The latter, with Cary Grant and Douglas Fairbanks Jr., was an adventure epic loosely based on Rudyard Kipling's poem that served as the template decades later for Indiana Jones and the Temple of Doom (1984).

He supported Nelson Eddy in Let Freedom Ring (1939) at MGM, and was in Ex-Champ (1939). He supported Brian Aherne in Captain Fury (1939), and starred in Full Confession (1939) for John Farrow at RKO, the latter film being somewhat a remake of The Informer.

At Universal, McLaglen teamed with Basil Rathbone in Rio (1939) and Jackie Cooper in The Big Guy (1939). He was top-billed in Edward Small's South Seas adventure, South of Pago Pago (1940). He remained top-billed for Diamond Frontier (1940) and Broadway Limited (1941).

McLaglen and Lowe reprised their roles from What Price Glory? in the radio program Captain Flagg and Sergeant Quirt, broadcast on the Blue Network (28 September 1941 – 25 January 1942, and on NBC 13 February 1942 – 3 April 1942).

McLaglen and Lowe then played basically the same roles, but under different names in Call Out the Marines (1942) at RKO. He starred in Powder Town (1942), and went to Fox to support Gene Tierney in China Girl (1942). He was one of many stars in Forever and a Day (1943), and had a support role in Tampico (1943) and Roger Touhy, Gangster (1944). McLaglen was a villain in Bob Hope's The Princess and the Pirate (1944), and he was in Rough, Tough and Ready (1945).

=== Supporting actor ===
McLaglen began to be exclusively a supporting actor, with parts in Love, Honor and Goodbye (1945), Whistle Stop (1946) with George Raft and Ava Gardner, Calendar Girl (1947), The Michigan Kid (1947), and The Foxes of Harrow (1947).

McLaglen was back with John Ford for Fort Apache (1948) with John Wayne and Henry Fonda. It was very much a support part, as a cavalry sergeant, but so well received that McLaglen basically reprised it in the other two films in the Ford-Wayne "cavalry trilogy": She Wore a Yellow Ribbon (1949) and Rio Grande (1950) with Maureen O'Hara and Ben Johnson.

McLaglen was later nominated for another Oscar, this time for a Best Supporting Actor for his role opposite John Wayne in The Quiet Man (1952). He continued to be in demand as a support actor in action films: Fair Wind to Java (1953) with Fred MacMurray and Prince Valiant (1954) with James Mason and Robert Wagner. He went to Britain for Trouble in the Glen (1954), an unsuccessful attempt to do for Scotland what The Quiet Man did for Ireland. Back in Hollywood, he was in Many Rivers to Cross (1955) at MGM with Robert Taylor and Eleanor Parker.

=== Later career ===
McLaglen had a rare late-career lead role in City of Shadows (1955) at Republic with Patricia Crowley, and he was second-billed in Bengazi (1955), but he went back to supports with Lady Godiva of Coventry (1955). He had a cameo in Around the World in 80 Days (1956) with David Niven and Cantinflas, then had another lead in The Abductors (1957), directed by his son, Andrew V. McLaglen.

Toward the end of his career, McLaglen made several guest appearances on television, particularly in Western series such as Have Gun, Will Travel and Rawhide. The episodes in which McLaglen guest-starred were both directed by his son, Andrew, who later became a film director, frequently directing John Wayne.

He went to Italy for Gli Italiani sono matti, and had a good part in Sea Fury (1958) with Stanley Baker.

== Activism ==
In 1933, he founded the California Light Horse Regiment, which included a "riding parade club, a polo-playing group and a precision motorcycle contingent". He described it in a press interview as promoting "Americanism". He said it was organized to fight communists and others "opposed to the American ideal", both inside and outside the country. McLaglen was attacked by some on the left as fascist, which he denied. He said he was a "patriot of the good old-fashioned American kind".

== Personal life and death ==
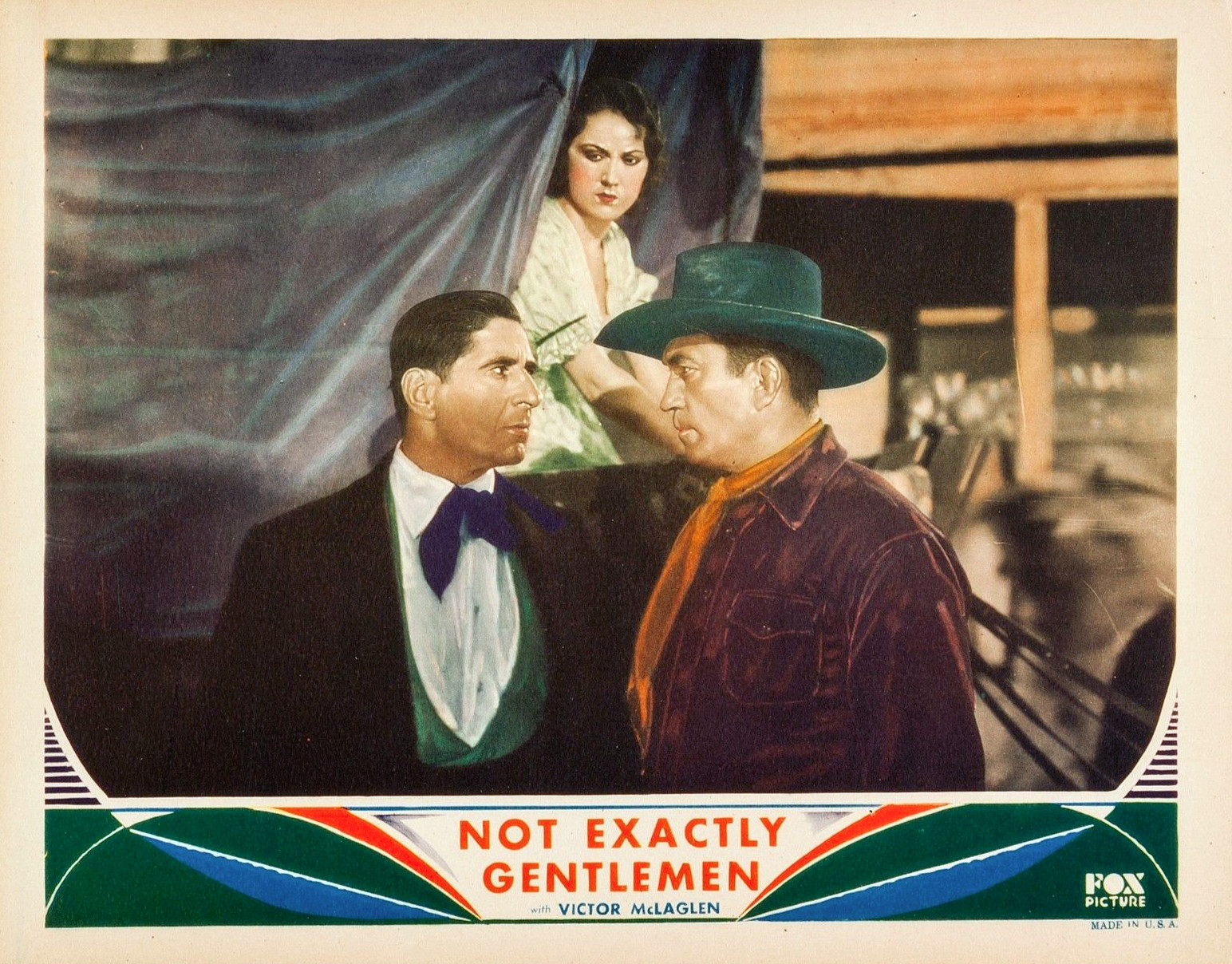
Fay Wray, Robert Warwick (left), and McLaglen in Not Exactly Gentlemen, also known as Three Rogues (1931)

In 1935, McLaglen spent a reported $40,000 (equal to $939,320 today) to build his own stadium near Riverside Drive and Hyperion Avenue, near Griffith Park and the Atwater Village neighborhood of Los Angeles. The stadium was used for football and many other activities. The Los Angeles River flood of 1938 seriously damaged the stadium, and it fell into disuse thereafter. In 1941, he was selected as the grand marshal of the Clovis Rodeo parade in Clovis, California.

McLaglen was married three times. He first married Enid Lamont in 1919. The couple had two sons, Andrew and Walter, and one daughter, Sheila. Andrew McLaglen was a television and film director who worked on several film projects with John Wayne. Andrew's children, Mary and Josh McLaglen, are both film producers and directors. Sheila's daughter, Gwyneth Horder-Payton, is a television director. Enid Lamont McLaglen died in 1942 as a result of a horse-riding accident.

His second marriage was to Suzanne M. Brueggeman. That marriage lasted from 1943 until 1948. His third and final marriage was to divorcée Margaret McNichols Pumphrey, a Seattle socialite he married in 1948. They remained married until his death from congestive heart failure in 1959.

He had by that time become a naturalized U.S. citizen. His cremated remains are interred at Forest Lawn Memorial Park, Glendale, in the Garden of Memory, Columbarium of Eternal Light.

On 8 February 1960, McLaglen received a star on the Hollywood Walk of Fame at 1735 Vine Street, for his contributions to the motion-picture industry.

McLaglen spoke five languages, including Arabic.

== Filmography ==
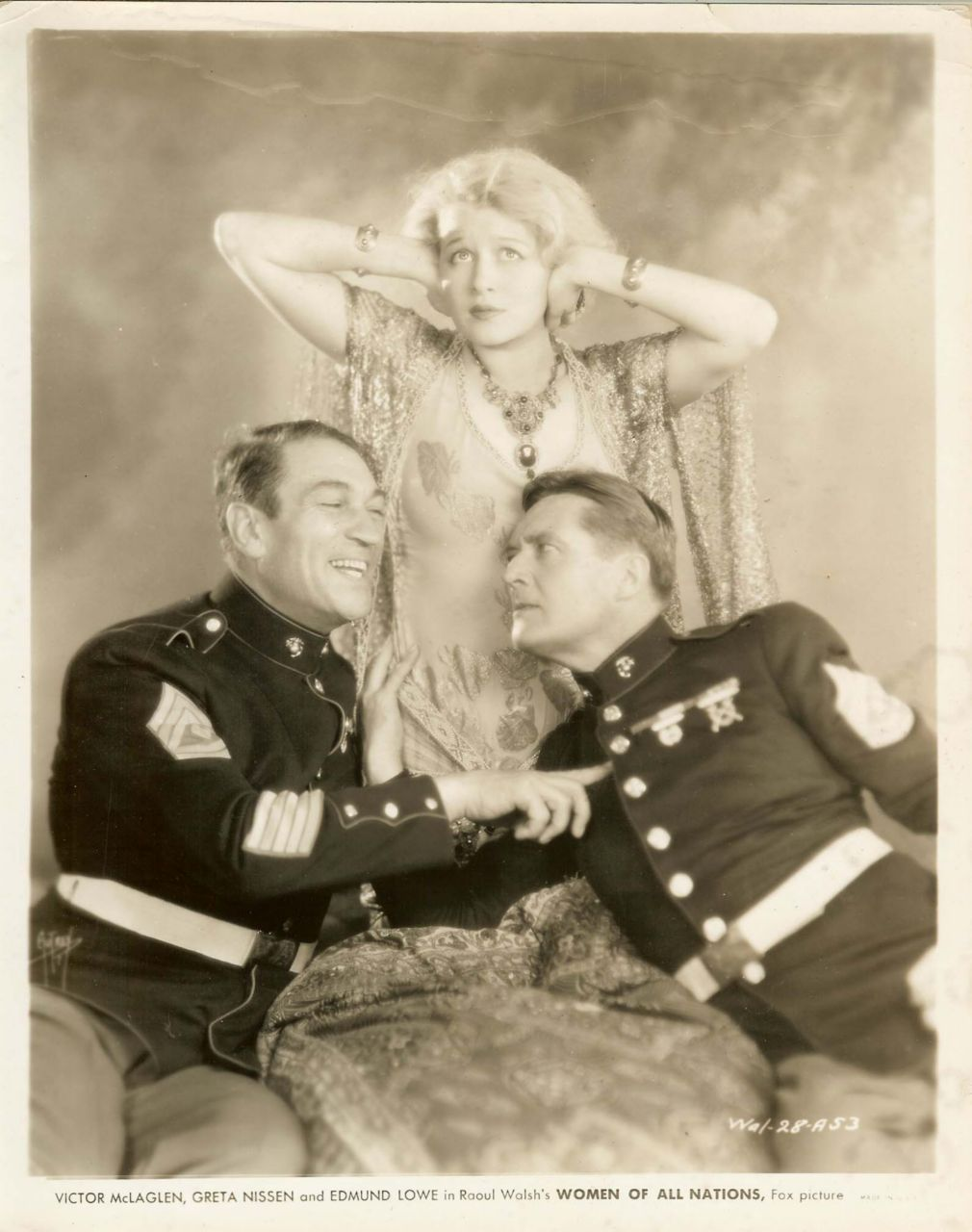
Promotional photo of McLaglen, with Greta Nissen and Edmund Lowe, for the 1931 comedy film Women of All Nations

Year	Title	Role	Notes
1920	The Call of the Road	Alf Truscott	Lost film
1921	Carnival	Baron	Lost film
1921	Corinthian Jack	Jack Halstead	Lost film
1921	The Prey of the Dragon	Brett 'Dragon' Mercer	Lost film
1921	The Sport of Kings	Frank Rosedale	Lost film
1922	The Glorious Adventure	Bulfinch	
1922	A Romance of Old Baghdad	Miski	Lost film
1922	Little Brother of God	King Kennidy	Lost film
1922	A Sailor Tramp	The Sailor Tramp	Lost film
1922	The Crimson Circle		Lost film
1923	The Romany	The Chief	Lost film
1923	Heartstrings	Frank Wilson	Lost film
1923	Woman to Woman	Nubian slave	Uncredited; Lost film
1923	M'Lord of the White Road	Lord Annerley / John	Lost film
1923	In the Blood	Tony Crabtree	Lost film
1924	The Boatswain's Mate	Ned Travers	Lost film
1924	Women and Diamonds	Brian Owen	Lost film
1924	The Gay Corinthian	Squire Hardcastle	Lost film
1924	The Passionate Adventure	Herb Harris	Lost film
1924	The Beloved Brute	Charles Hinges	
1925	The Hunted Woman	Quade	Lost film
1925	Percy	Reedy Jenkins	Lost film
1925	The Unholy Three	Hercules, the strongman	
1925	Winds of Chance	Poleon Doret	
1925	The Fighting Heart	Soapy Williams	Lost film
1926	The Isle of Retribution	Doomsdorf	Lost film
1926	Men of Steel	Pete Masarick	Lost film
1926	Beau Geste	Hank	
1926	What Price Glory?	Capt. Flagg	
1927	The Loves of Carmen	Escamillo	
1928	Mother Machree	The Giant of Kilkenny (Terence O'Dowd)	With John Ford & John Wayne. Incomplete film
1928	A Girl in Every Port	Spike Madden	
1928	Hangman's House	Citizen Denis Hogan	With John Ford & John Wayne.
1928	The River Pirate	Sailor Fritz	
1929	Captain Lash	Captain Lash	
1929	Strong Boy	Strong Boy	Lost film
1929	The Black Watch	Capt. Donald Gordon King	With John Ford & John Wayne.
1929	Happy Days	Minstrel Show Performer #1	Lost film
1929	The Cock-Eyed World	Top Sergeant Flagg	
1929	Hot for Paris	John Patrick Duke	Lost film
1930	On the Level	Biff Williams	
1930	A Devil with Women	Jerry Maxton	
1931	Dishonored	Col. Kranau	
1931	Not Exactly Gentlemen	Bull Stanley	
1931	The Stolen Jools	Sergeant Flagg	
1931	Women of All Nations	Captain Jim Flagg	
1931	Annabelle's Affairs	John Rawson / Hefly Jack	Lost film
1931	Wicked	Scott Burrows	
1932	The Gay Caballero	Don Bob Harkness / El Coyote	
1932	Devil's Lottery	Jem Meech	
1932	While Paris Sleeps	Jacques Costaud	
1932	Guilty as Hell	Detective Capt. T.R. McKinley	
1932	Rackety Rax	'Knucks' McGloin	
1933	Hot Pepper	Jim Flagg	
1933	Laughing at Life	Dennis P. McHale / Burke / Captain Hale	
1934	The Lost Patrol	The Sergeant	
1934	No More Women	Forty-Fathoms	
1934	Wharf Angel	Turk	
1934	Dick Turpin	Dick Turpin	
1934	Murder at the Vanities	Police Lt. Bill Murdock	
1934	The Captain Hates the Sea	Junius P. Schulte	
1935	Under Pressure	Jumbo Smith	
1935	The Great Hotel Murder	Andrew W. 'Andy' McCabe	
1935	The Informer	Gypo Nolan	Academy Award for Best Actor; Nominated — New York Film Critics Circle Award for Best Actor
1935	Professional Soldier	Michael Donovan	
1936	Klondike Annie	Bull Brackett	
1936	Under Two Flags	J.C. Doyle	
1936	The Magnificent Brute	'Big Steve' Andrews	as Victor McLaglen – Academy Award Winner
1937	Sea Devils	CPO William 'Medals' Malone	
1937	Nancy Steele Is Missing!	Dannie O'Neill	
1937	This Is My Affair	Jock Ramsay	
1937	Wee Willie Winkie	Sgt. Donald MacDuff	
1937	Ali Baba Goes to Town	Himself	Uncredited
1938	Battle of Broadway	Big Ben Wheeler	
1938	The Devil's Party	Marty Malone	
1938	We're Going to Be Rich	Dobbie	
1939	Pacific Liner	J.B. 'Crusher' McKay, Chief Engineer	
1939	Gunga Din	Sgt. 'Mac' MacChesney	
1939	Let Freedom Ring	Chris Mulligan	
1939	Ex-Champ	Tom 'Gunner' Grey	
1939	Captain Fury	Jerry Black aka Blackie	
1939	Full Confession	Patt McGinnis	
1939	Rio	Dirk	
1939	The Big Guy	Warden Bill Whitlock	
1940	South of Pago Pago	Bucko Larson	
1940	Diamond Frontier	Terrence Regan	
1941	Broadway Limited	Maurice 'Mike' Monohan	
1942	Call Out the Marines	Sgt. Jimmy McGinnis	
1942	Powder Town	Jeems O'Shea	
1942	China Girl	Major Bull Weed	
1943	Forever and a Day	Archibald Spavin (hotel doorman)	
1944	Tampico	Fred Adamson	
1944	Roger Touhy, Gangster	Herman 'Owl' Banghart	
1944	The Princess and the Pirate	Captain Barrett ak The Hook	
1945	Rough, Tough and Ready	Owen McCare	
1945	Love, Honor and Goodbye	Terry O'Farrell	
1946	Whistle Stop	Gitlo	
1947	Calendar Girl	Matthew O'Neil	
1947	The Michigan Kid	Curley Davis	
1947	The Foxes of Harrow	Captain Mike Farrell	
1948	Fort Apache	Sgt. Festus Mulcahy	With John Ford & John Wayne.
1949	She Wore a Yellow Ribbon	Top Sgt. Quincannon	With John Ford & John Wayne.
1950	Rio Grande	Sgt. Maj. Timothy Quincannon	With John Ford & John Wayne.
1952	The Quiet Man	Squire 'Red' Will Danaher	With John Ford & John Wayne; Nominated — Academy Award for Best Supporting Actor
1953	Fair Wind to Java	O'Brien	
1953	This Is Your Life	Himself	episode: Victor McLaglen
1954	Prince Valiant	Boltar	
1954	Trouble in the Glen	Parlan	
1955	Many Rivers to Cross	Mr. Cadmus Cherne	
1955	City of Shadows	Big Tim Channing	
1955	Bengazi	Robert Emmett Donovan	
1955	Lady Godiva of Coventry	Grimald	
1956	Around the World in 80 Days	Helmsman of the SS Henrietta	
1957	The Abductors	Tom Muldoon	
1958	Have Gun – Will Travel	Mike O'Hare	Episode: "The O'Hare Story"
1958	The Italians They Are Crazy	Sergente O'Riley	
1958	Sea Fury	Captain Bellew	
1959	Rawhide	Harry Wittman	Episode: "Incident of the Shambling Man", (final appearance)

== See also ==
- List of actors with Academy Award nominations
- List of bare-knuckle boxers
