= John P. Medbury =

American humorist (died 1947)

John P. Medbury (died June 29, 1947) was an American humorist.

Medbury contributed a regular series for the New York Journal-American called Mutter and Muble. A 1931 edition of the Motion Picture Herald referred to him as noted humorist of Hearst paper fame. He wrote comedic content for the Reservist, a newspaper produced at the San Pedro Naval Reserve Training Camp. In the late 1920s, he wrote the comic strip "Molly the Manicure", drawn by Virginia Huget.

In 1936, Medbury focused on screen writing, for Metro-Goldwyn-Mayer and Columbia studios at various times. He wrote for the Amos 'n' Andy show. Medbury featured in several of Walter Futter's Travelaughs (Laughing with Medbury) films – short film travelogues where he provided comedic commentary: Laughing with Medbury in Abyssinia, Laughing with Medbury in Africa (1931), Laughing with Medbury in Borneo (1931), Laughing with Medbury in Death Valley (1931), Laughing with Medbury in Mandalay, Laughing with Medbury in Reno (1931), Laughing with Medbury in Turkey (1931), and Laughing with Medbury on Voo Doo Island.

Medbury's first wife, actress Phyllis Eltis Medbury, died in 1936. He died June 29, 1947, aged 54, in Laguna Beach, California, from a myocardial infarction. He is buried at Forest Lawn Memorial Park in Glendale, California.

== Film writing credits ==
- Reported Missing (1922) – titles
- Hold 'Em Jail (1932) – radio dialogue
- Love in Bloom (1935) – additional dialogue
- Radio Bedtime Stories for Grownups
  - "Hot and Bothered" (1930), story.
  - "Never Strike Your Mother", story, with Eddie Buzzell.
