= Byron (play) =

Play by Alicia Ramsey

Byron is a historical play by the British writer Alicia Ramsey, which was first performed in 1908. It depicts the life of the early nineteenth-century writer Lord Byron.

== Adaptation ==
In 1922 the play was adapted into a silent film A Prince of Lovers directed by Charles Calvert and starring Howard Gaye as Byron.
