= Lights of London =

Lights of London may refer to:

- The Lights o' London, an 1881 melodramatic play by George R. Sims
- Lights of London (1914 film), a British silent film
- Lights of London (1923 film), a British silent film
