= Tonight Is Ours =

1933 film by Stuart Walker

- Theatrical release poster
- Directed by: Stuart Walker
- Screenplay by: Edwin Justus Mayer
- Based on: Tonight Is Ours by Noël Coward
- Starring: Claudette Colbert; Fredric March; Alison Skipworth
- Cinematography: Karl Struss
- Music by: Karl Hajos; John Leipold
- Production company: Paramount Pictures
- Distributed by: Paramount Pictures
- Release date: January 21, 1933 (US)
- Running time: 75 minutes
- Country: United States
- Language: English

Tonight Is Ours is a 1933 American Pre-Code drama film directed by Stuart Walker and starring Claudette Colbert, Fredric March and Alison Skipworth. Made by Paramount Pictures, it is based on the play The Queen Was in the Parlour by Noël Coward.

== Plot ==
It tells the story of a princess who had an affair with another handsome commoner before her marriage to a prince.

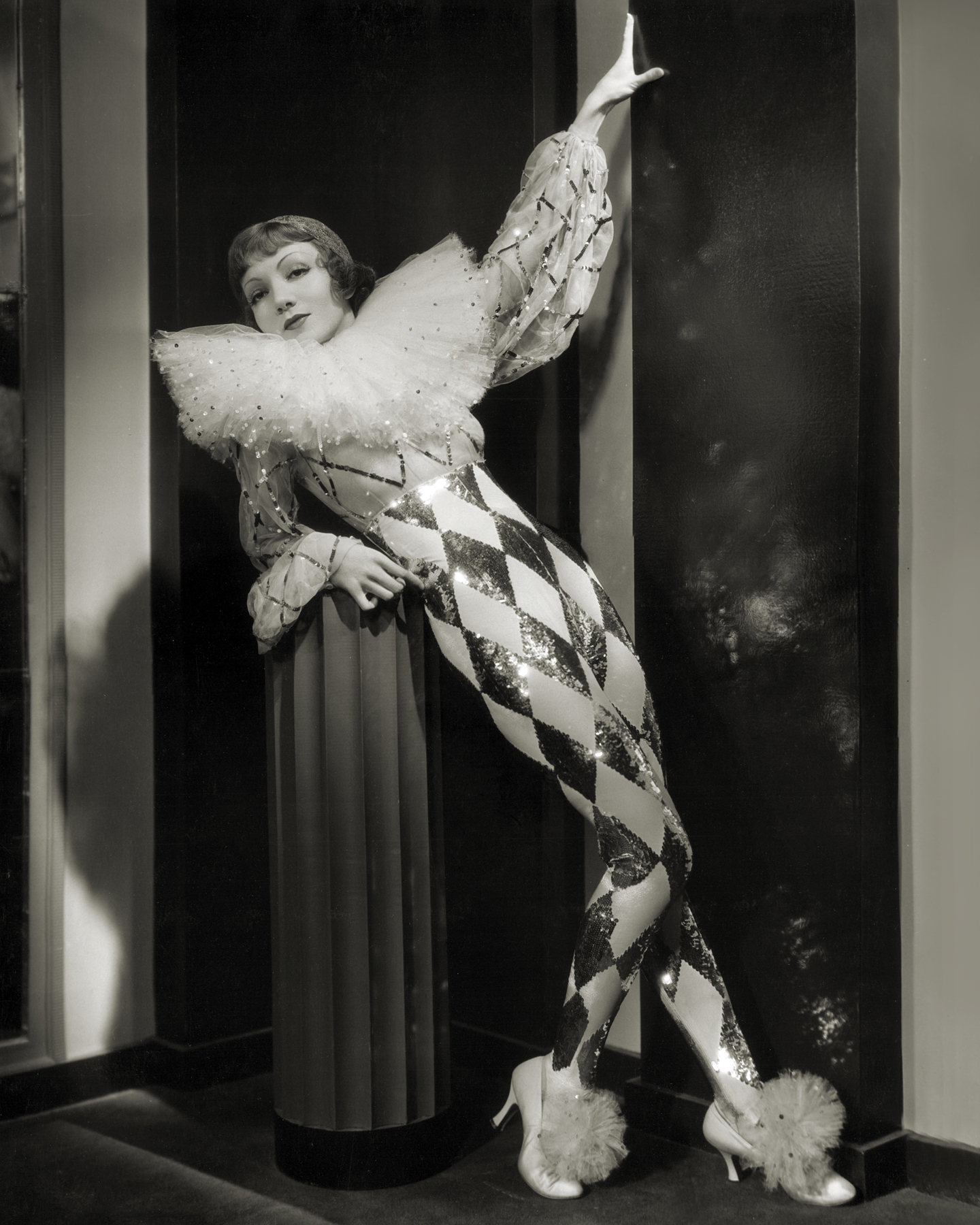
Colbert as Princess Nadya

== Cast ==
- Claudette Colbert as Princess Nadya
- Fredric March as Sabien Pastal
- Alison Skipworth as Grand Duchess Emilie
- Arthur Byron as Gen. Krish
- Paul Cavanagh as Prince Keri
- Ethel Griffies as Zana
- Clay Clement as Seminoff
- Warburton Gamble as Alex
- Edwin Maxwell as mob leader

== See also ==
- The Queen Was in the Parlour (1927)

== Notes ==
- Mander, Raymond; Joe Mitchenson (2000) [1957]. Theatrical Companion to Coward. Barry Day and Sheridan Morley (2000 edition, ed.) (second ed.). London: Oberon Books. ISBN 978-1-84002-054-0.
