= Bonnie Prince Charlie (disambiguation) =

Bonnie Prince Charlie, or Charles Edward Stuart (1720–1788), was the Jacobite claimant to the throne of Great Britain.

Bonnie Prince Charlie may also refer to:

- Bonnie Prince Charlie (1923 film), a silent film starring Ivor Novello
- Bonnie Prince Charlie (1948 film), a 1948 film starring David Niven
- Bonnie Prince Charlie: A Tale of Fontenoy and Culloden, a novel by G. A. Henty
