= The Queen Was in the Parlour =

1926 play written by Noël Coward

The Queen Was in the Parlour: a romance in three acts is a play by the English writer Noël Coward. Although written in 1922 it was not produced until 24 August 1926, when it was premiered at the St Martin's Theatre.

The play is Coward's only venture into Ruritanian romance. It ran for 136 performances and was well received, but has nonetheless never been revived in the West End.

== Background and first production ==
In 1922 Coward was a rising playwright, but he had yet to become famous. He wrote The Queen Was in the Parlour in the spring of 1922 while staying in St Mary in the Marsh in Kent, and between its creation and its first production, four years later, it was given the title Nadya, and later Souvenir before the final title was adopted. By 1926 The Vortex (1924) and Hay Fever (1925) had made Coward's name, and the producer Basil Dean staged The Queen Was in the Parlour, directing it himself. The play opened at the St Martin's Theatre on 14 August 1926, and transferred to the Duke of York's Theatre on 4 October, running in total for 136 performances.

The title is drawn from one of the verses of a 1700s English nursery rhyme, "Sing a Song of Sixpence."

== Original cast ==
- Nadya – Madge Titheradge
- Sabien Pastal – Francis Lister
- Zana – Freda Godfrey
- General Krish – C. M. Hallard
- Miss Phipps – Ada King
- Court Usher – C. Disney Roebuck
- Prince Keri of Zalgar – Herbert Marshall
- Grand Duchess Emilie –Lady Tree

== Synopsis ==
=== Act I ===
==== Scene 1: Nadya's flat in Paris. 5.00 a.m. ====
Nadya, the young widow of Archduke Alexander of Krayia, enters with her fiancé, Sabien. They are both tired of partying and agree to get married and settle down. Standing in the early sunlight they drink champagne to their future happiness, but as they do so the sun goes behind a cloud.

==== Scene 2: The same. A few hours later. ====
After Sabien has gone home, General Krish arrives from Krayia with the news that the king has been assassinated and that Nadya, being next in succession, must return to Krayia as its queen. Nadya is horrified, but the general convinces her that it is her duty, as the country is dangerously unstable, with revolution in the air, and her presence may calm matters. She sadly writes Sabien a farewell letter.

=== Act II ===
==== The private apartments of the queen. One year later, in the afternoon. ====
Nadya is to marry Prince Keri of Zalgar. A shot is heard: someone has tried to shoot Nadya as she arrives in her carriage, but the assassin's aim was deflected by a man in the crowd. Nadya and Keri meet for the first time, and amicably agree that the interests of state oblige them to marry, although each has had to give up a true love to do so. The shrewd old Grand Duchess Emilie, who has seen off three husbands, arrives for tea with the royal couple and General Krish, and quickly sees how matters rest. At Krish's suggestion Nadya grants a private audience to the man in the crowd who saved her life. It turns out to be Sabien. He tells her that he cannot bear to see her marry another man, and will shoot himself. He pleads with her to spend one final night with him, to which after a show of reluctance, she agrees.

=== Act III ===
==== Scene 1: The same as Act II. In the evening. ====
Sabien arrives and is concealed in an adjoining room by Nadya's loyal maid, Zana. Keri and Nadya enter and talk, agreeing that they will be friends "come weal, come woe". After he leaves, Nadya and Sabien dine together,

==== Scene 2: The same. A few hours later ====
It is four in the morning. Krish and Keri are in the queen's ante-room, keeping watch for civil unrest and insurrection. As a dangerous crowd gathers outside the palace, Nadya enters from the bedroom. She goes on the balcony and tells the mob to shoot her if they have the courage. Keri joins her and suggests that the crowd would be better off at home in bed, which makes them laugh and defuses the situation. After the crowd has dispersed, Nadya turns to Keri and begs his forgiveness. He is puzzled, but quickly understands matters when a shot is heard in Nadya's bedroom. He falls to one knee and kisses Nadya's hand.

Source: Mander and Mitchenson.

== Revivals and adaptations ==
The Queen Was in the Parlour was revived at the Malvern Festival in 1932, by a company including Kate Cutler and the young James Mason. Mander and Mitchenson's Theatrical Companion to Noël Coward (2000) notes that there has never been a major London or New York revival.

The play has been adapted for film twice. An Anglo-German version under the original title, was filmed in 1927, starring Lili Damita and Paul Richter. It was premiered at the Avenue Pavilion, London February 1928. In 1933 an American film version, Tonight Is Ours starred Claudette Colbert and Fredric March.

== Critical reception ==
The press expressed mild surprise that Coward, who had gained fame for his daringly controversial The Vortex, should turn to Ruritanian romance, but the reviews were generally friendly. The Times said "[T[his is Mr. Coward in romantic vein, and little else matters so long as the romance goes with a swing. This it does indeed." In The Daily Mail, Alan Parsons wrote, "It is all strong stuff, some of it witty stuff, some of it hot stuff, but Mr. Coward shows that he can construct what is known as a 'a well-made play' with the best of the Victorians. In The Observer, St John Ervine wrote:

Mr. Coward gives us both his best and his worst in generous measure. There are passages and even scenes in this play so poverty-stricken and dull that one has difficulty in believing that anybody wrote them. They are followed by passages and scenes so swiftly sincere and dramatic that one is certain that nobody but Mr. Coward could have written them. He tells a story here, and tells it very well, but he still shows signs of too great facility.

Looking back in the 1950s, Coward wrote:

It was my one and only expedition into Ruritania and I enjoyed it very much. Ruritania is a dangerous country where romantic clichés lurk in every throne-room, but at that time I was young and eager and valiantly oblivious of them. ... on the whole, I didn't make a bad job of it. The first act in Paris is a little forced and over-hectic, but the second and third acts contain some good moments. ... The whole play was illuminated by the magic of Madge Titheradge's acting. Her restrained emotion in the farewell supper scene ... and her stillness and dignity at the end of the play I shall always remember with loving gratitude.

== Sources ==
- Coward, Noël (2004) [1937]. Present Indicative. London: Methuen. ISBN 978-0-413-77413-2.
- Mander, Raymond; Joe Mitchenson (2000) [1957]. Theatrical Companion to Coward. Barry Day and Sheridan Morley (2000 edition, ed.) (second ed.). London: Oberon Books. ISBN 978-1-84002-054-0.
