= A Prince of Lovers =

1922 film

- Directed by: Charles Calvert
- Based on: Byron by Alicia Ramsey
- Starring: Howard Gaye; Marjorie Hume; Mary Clare; David Hawthorne
- Cinematography: A. St. A. Brown; Basil Emmott
- Production company: British Screencraft
- Distributed by: Gaumont British Distributors
- Release date: June 1922
- Running time: 80 minutes
- Country: United Kingdom
- Languages: Silent; English intertitles

A Prince of Lovers, also known as The Life of Lord Byron, is a 1922 British silent biographical film directed by Charles Calvert and starring Howard Gaye, Marjorie Hume and Mary Clare. The film portrays the life of the British writer Lord Byron, and was based on Alicia Ramsey's play Byron (1908).

== Cast ==
- Howard Gaye as Lord Byron
- Marjorie Hume as Isabella Milbanke
- Mary Clare as Lady Caroline Lamb
- David Hawthorne as Cam Hobhouse
- Marjorie Day as Augusta Leigh
- George Foley as Sir Ralph Milbanke
- H.R. Hignett as Fletcher
- Wyndham Guise as Joe
- Gladys Hamilton as Lady Milbanke
- W.D.C. Knox as Sir Walter Scott
- Viva Birkett as Lady Jersey
- Eugene Leahy as Tom Moore
- Bellenden Powell as Prince Regent
- Saba Raleigh as Madame de Stael
- Geoffrey Dunstan as Scrope Davis
- Emmeline Ormsby as Mrs. Byron
- Hector Abbas as Murray
- Eileen Onions as Ada Augusta Byron
- Madge Tree as Mrs. Clermont
- Marie Ault as Nannie

== Bibliography ==
- Low, Rachael. History of the British Film, 1918-1929. George Allen & Unwin, 1971.
