= Cab No. 13 =

1926 film

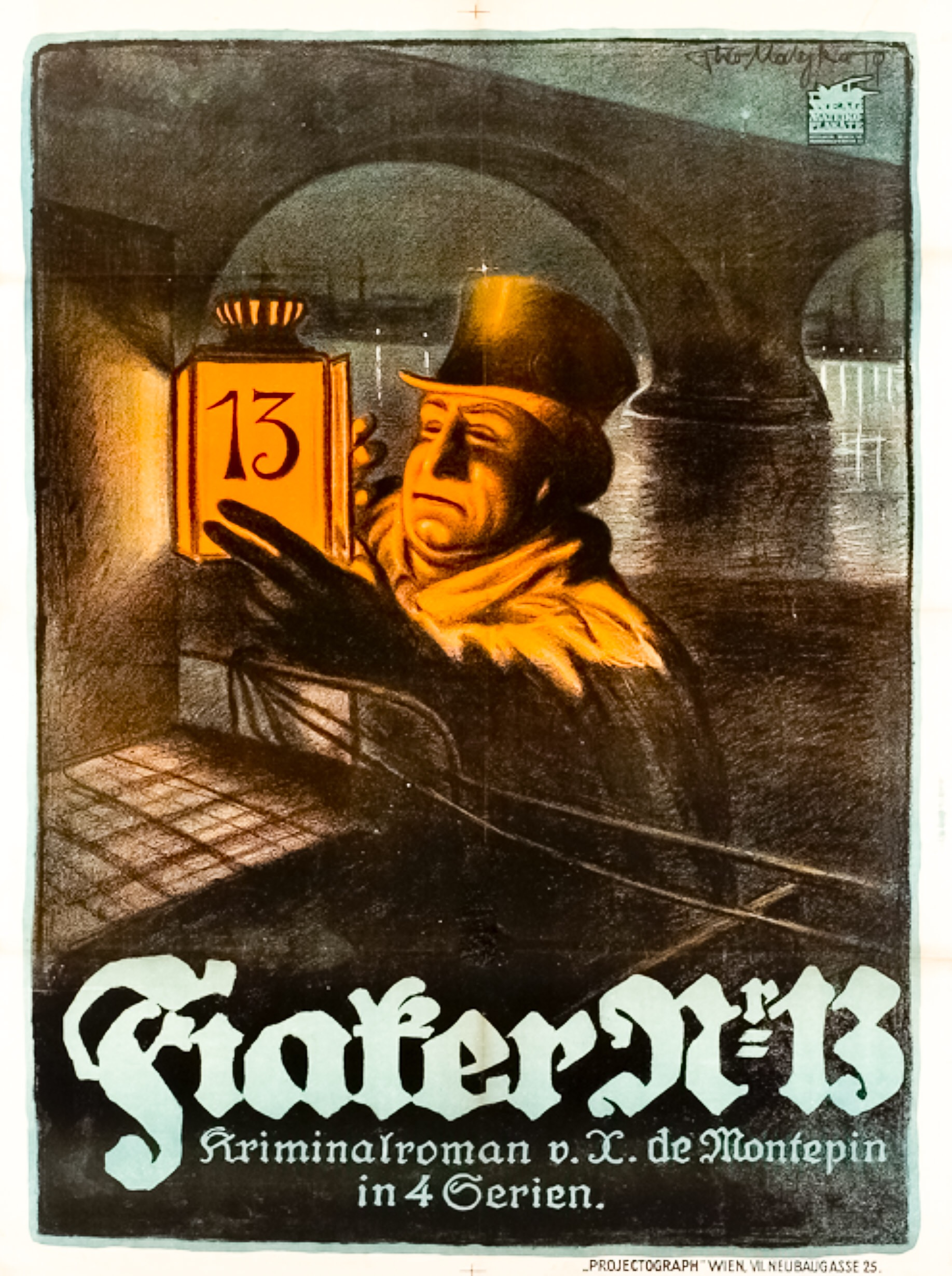
- Directed by: Michael Kertész
- Written by: Alfred Schirokauer
- Based on: Le Fiacre Nº 13 (novel) by Xavier de Montépin
- Produced by: Arnold Pressburger
- Starring: Lili Damita; Jack Trevor; Walter Rilla
- Cinematography: Gustav Ucicky; Eduard von Borsody
- Music by: Willy Schmidt-Gentner
- Production companies: Phoebus Film; Sascha Film
- Distributed by: Phoebus Film; Sascha Film
- Release date: 6 March 1926
- Running time: 78 minutes
- Countries: Germany; Austria

Cab No. 13 (German: Fiaker Nr. 13 (Austria), Einspanner Nr 13 (Germany); Dutch: Snorder No. 13; French: Fiacre 13) is a 1926 drama film directed by Michael Curtiz and starring Lili Damita, Jack Trevor and Walter Rilla.

The film's sets were designed by the art director Paul Leni. Location shooting took place in Paris.

== Story ==
Set in 1910, a young mother leaves her newborn baby in a carriage. The coachman takes care of the baby and names her Lilian. The child becomes a graceful dancer and falls in love with her neighbor, a young musician. Before they marry, Lilian finds her father who is a rich importer. She now has two fathers who care about her happiness.

== Cast ==
- Lili Damita as Lilian
- Jack Trevor as François Tapin
- Paul Biensfeldt as Jacques Carotin
- Walter Rilla as Lucien Rebout
- Max Gülstorff as L'antiquaire
- Valeska Stock as Mme Coco
- Sophie Pagay as Linotte
- Albert Paulig as Le maître de ballet
- Carl Ebert as Henri Landon

== See also ==
- Cab Number 13 (1948)
