= Poor, Dear Margaret Kirby =

1921 film

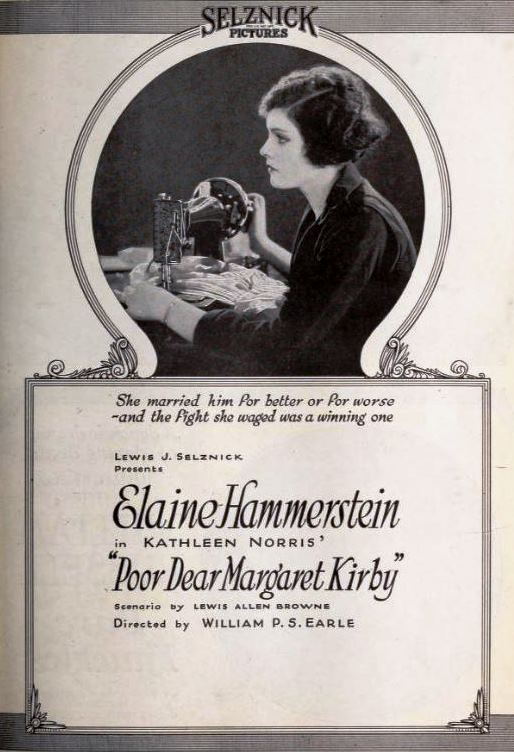
- Directed by: William P.S. Earle
- Written by: Lewis Allen Browne; Kathleen Norris
- Produced by: Lewis J. Selznick
- Starring: Elaine Hammerstein; Helen Lindroth; Warburton Gamble
- Cinematography: William F. Wagner
- Production company: Selznick Pictures
- Distributed by: Select Pictures
- Release date: February 1921
- Running time: 50 minutes
- Country: United States
- Languages: Silent; English intertitles

Poor, Dear Margaret Kirby is a 1921 American silent drama film directed by William P.S. Earle and starring Elaine Hammerstein, Helen Lindroth and Warburton Gamble. It was produced by Selznick Pictures and shot at the company's studios in Fort Lee, New Jersey.

== Cast ==
- Elaine Hammerstein as Margaret Kirby
- William B. Donaldson as John Kirby
- Ellen Cassidy as Lucille Yardsley
- Helen Lindroth as Mrs. Dunning
- Warburton Gamble as Gordon Pell

== Bibliography ==
- Connelly, Robert B. The Silents: Silent Feature Films, 1910-36, Volume 40, Issue 2. December Press, 1998.
- Munden, Kenneth White. The American Film Institute Catalog of Motion Pictures Produced in the United States, Part 1. University of California Press, 1997.
