= Warburton Gamble =

English actor (1882–1945)

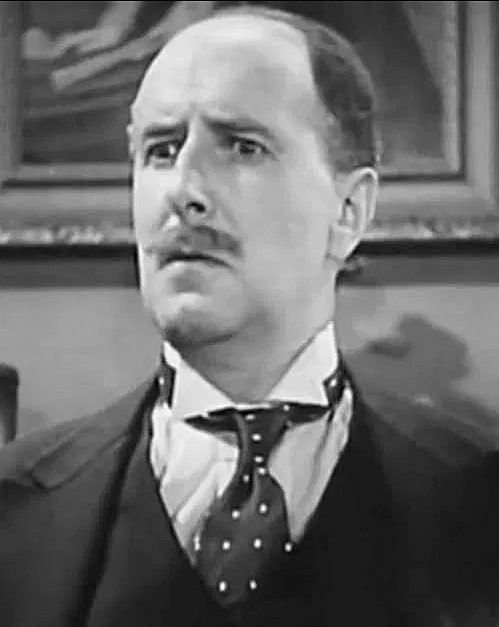
- Gamble in A Study in Scarlet
- Born: Evelyn Charles Warburton Gamble; 16 December 1882; London, England, UK
- Died: 27 August 1945 (aged 62); London, England, UK
- Occupation: Actor
- Spouse: Gillian Scaife

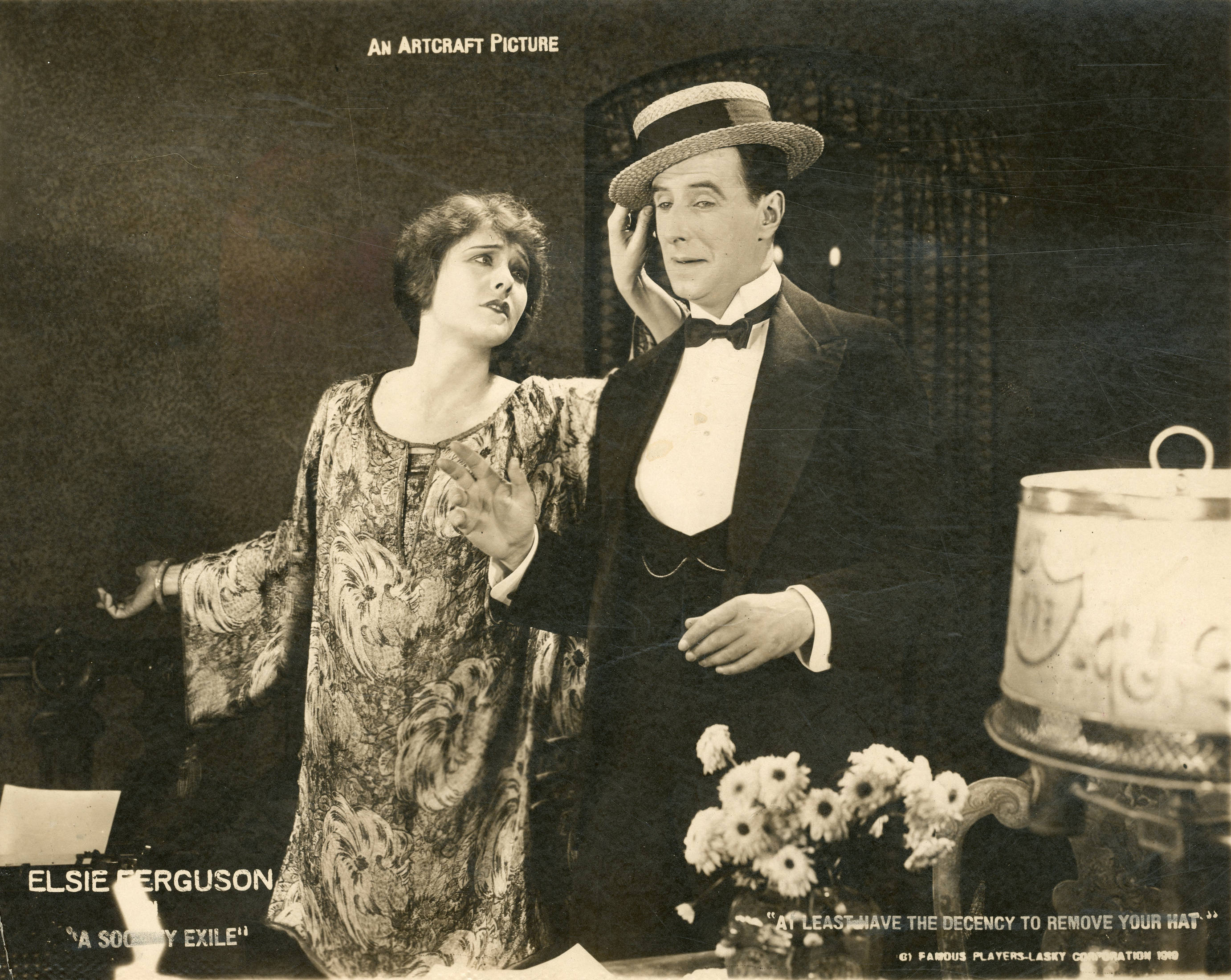
Gamble with Elsie Ferguson in A Society Exile 1919.

Evelyn Charles Warburton Gamble (16 December 1882 – 27 August 1945) was a British stage and film actor.

Gamble was born on 16 December 1882 in London and acted on stage professionally as early as 1905. His work on stage included a season of acting with the Theater Guild Repertory Company in San Francisco. He debuted on Broadway in Love and the Man (1905), appeared with Auriol Lee in Milestones (1912) and last performed on Broadway in Tonight or Never (1930).

Gamble's film debut occurred in The Unforeseen (1917). He spent a number of years working in Hollywood during the silent and early sound eras. He played the role of Doctor Watson in the 1933 Sherlock Holmes film A Study in Scarlet. His final two films were at Ealing Studios.

Gamble was married to English actress Gillian Scaife. He died on 27 August 1945 in London.

== Filmography ==
Year	Title	Role	Notes
1917	The Unforeseen	Henry Traquair	
1918	Thirty a Week	Freddy Ruyter	
1919	The Silver King	Herbert Skinner	
1919	The Two Brides	Count Gabrielle di Marchesi	
1919	As a Man Thinks	Benjamin De Lota	
1919	A Society Exile	Lord Bissett	
1919	La Belle Russe	Phillip Sackton	
1919	The Invisible Bond	Otis Vale	
1920	The Paliser Case	Monty Paliser	
1920	The Cost	Mowbray Langdon	
1920	The Law of the Yukon	Medford Delaney	
1921	Poor, Dear Margaret Kirby	Gordon Pell	
1921	Fine Feathers	John Brand	
1921	Dangerous Lies	Leonard Pearce	
1923	Lights of London	Clifford Armytage	
1931	Tonight or Never	Count Albert von Gronac	
1932	As You Desire Me	Baron	
1932	Fast Life	Halstead	
1933	Tonight Is Ours	Alex	
1933	Child of Manhattan	Eggleston	
1933	A Study in Scarlet	Dr. Watson	
1933	By Candlelight	Baron von Ballin	
1936	Blind Man's Bluff	Tracy	
1936	Lonely Road	Fedden	
1940	Spare a Copper	Sir Robert	(final film role)

== Bibliography ==
- Hardy, Phil. The BFI Companion to Crime. University of California Press, 1997.
