= William P. S. Earle =

American film director (1882–1972)

William Pitt Striker Earle
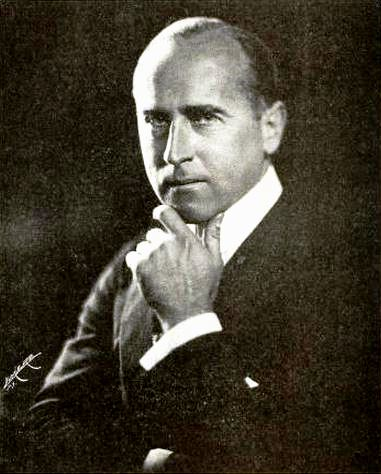
- Earle in 1921
- Born: December 28, 1882; New York City, U.S.
- Died: November 30, 1972 (aged 89); Los Angeles, California, U.S.
- Burial place: Forest Lawn Memorial Park, Glendale
- Occupation: Film director
- Years active: 1915–1926
- Spouse(s): Valerie Damon De Blois (m. 1905;div. 1915); Blanche Earle (m. 1952; her death); Evangeline Russell (m. 1966; her death)
- Father: Ferdinand P. Earle

William Pitt Striker Earle (December 28, 1882 – November 30, 1972) was an American director of the silent film era. He attended Columbia University and worked for a time as a photographer before breaking into the movie business by sneaking onto the lot of Vitagraph Company of America to observe how directors worked. After a few days of this, Earle approached the studio president and was given his first movie to direct, For the Honor of the Crew, a short about a crew race at Columbia University. He subsequently directed a number of features and shorts for Vitagraph. Later he worked with producer David O. Selznick. Earle founded his own, short-lived production company called Amex Production Corporation with J. S. Joffe, and shot the final two films of his career in Mexico.

== Personal life ==
Earle was born in New York City. He was the son of Ferdinand P. Earle, a hotelier and military officer.

He married Valerie Damon De Blois in 1905. They divorced in 1915. He next married English actress Blanche Taylor, who later went by the name "Bonnie Earle", and was with him until her death in 1952. Earle's last wife was former actress Evangeline Russell Blackton, the widow of Vitagraph executive J. Stuart Blackton. She died in 1966.

His daughter Valerie married economist Henry Hazlitt in 1929.

== Feature filmography ==
- The Law Decides co-directed with Marguerite Bertsch (1916)
- The Scarlet Runner co-directed with Wally Van (1916)
- Whom the Gods Destroy co-directed with J. Stuart Blackton, Herbert Brenon (1916)
- The Courage of Silence (1917)
- Womanhood, the Glory of the Nation co-directed with J. Stuart Blackton (1917)
- Within the Law (1917)
- Mary Jane's Pa co-directed with Charles Brabin (1917)
- I Will Repay (1917)
- Who Goes There? (1917)
- His Own People (1917)
- The Wooing of Princess Pat (1918)
- Little Miss No-Account (1918)
- The Little Runaway (1918)
- Heredity (1918)
- T'Other Dear Charmer (1918)
- The Love Hunger (1919)
- The Better Wife (1919)
- The Lone Wolf's Daughter (1919)
- The Broken Melody (1919)
- The Woman Game (1920)
- Whispers (1920)
- The Dangerous Paradise (1920)
- The Road of Ambition (1920)
- Poor, Dear Margaret Kirby (1921)
- Gilded Lies (1921)
- The Last Door (1921)
- The Way of a Maid (1921)
- Love's Masquerade (1922)
- Destiny's Isle (1922)
- The Dancer of the Nile (1923)
- Tras las bambalinas del bataclan (1925)
- Milagros de la Guadalupana (1926)
