= The Lights o' London =

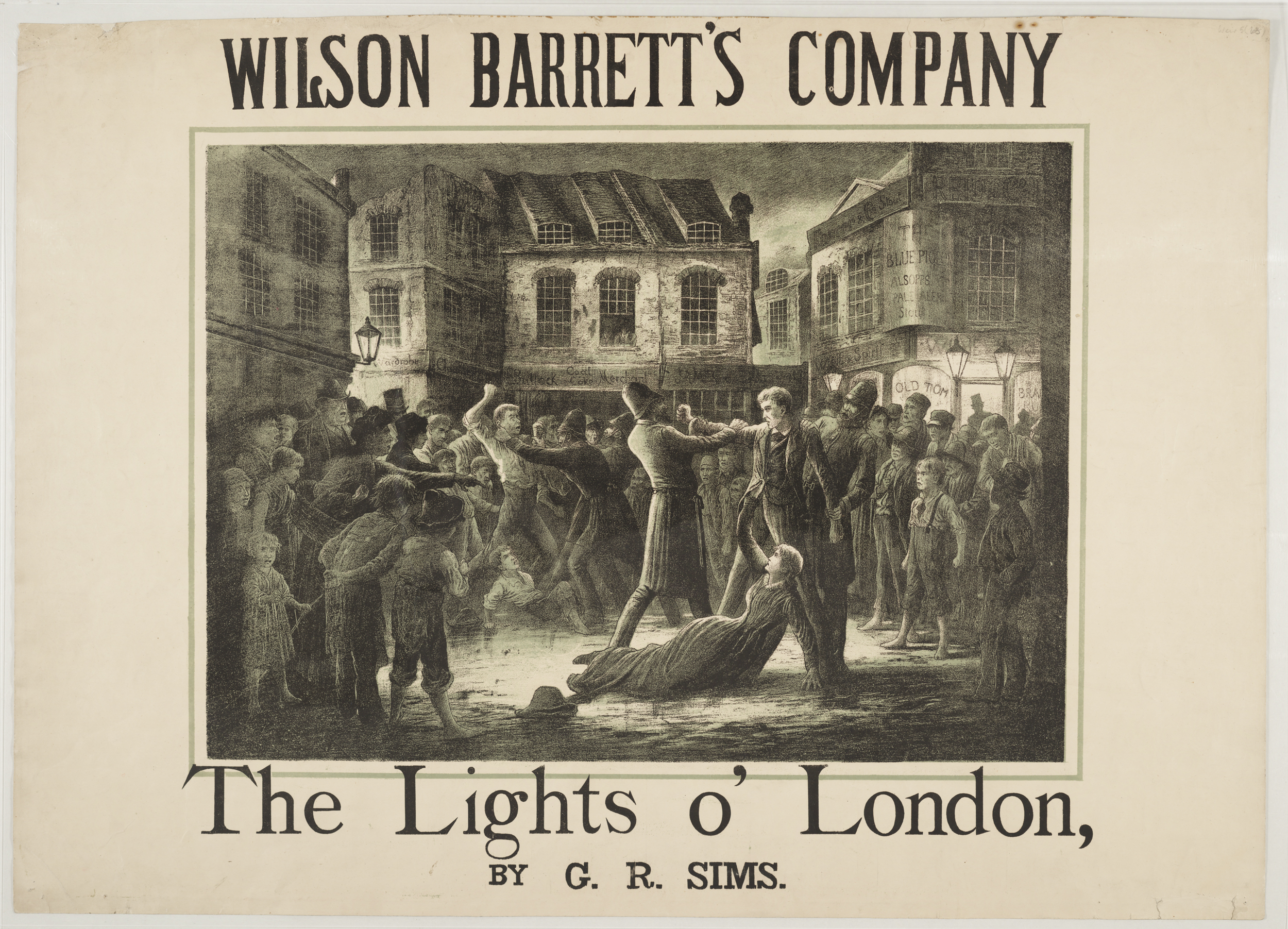
Poster for an Edinburgh production, c. 1885

The Lights o' London is a melodramatic play, by George R. Sims, first produced in London on 10 September 1881 at the Princess's Theatre, produced by and starring Wilson Barrett. The play was a hit, running for 226 nights, and was frequently revived thereafter. It also opened in New York at the Union Square Theatre in December 1881 and was revived twice on Broadway. (Note: In April 1911 at the Lyric Theatre with Doris Keane and Douglas Fairbanks.)

The play was twice made into silent films, both titled Lights of London, in 1914, directed by Bert Haldane and 1923, directed by Charles Calvert.

== Synopsis ==
Harold Armytage and Bess Marks elope. Harold's father is rich but after the elopement disowns him. Clifford Armytage, Harold's scheming cousin, and Seth Preene, a friend of Harold's father, frame innocent Harold for a crime so that Clifford will inherit the father's money instead of Harold. Seth aids Clifford because he hopes that his daughter, Hetty (who declares "I hate poor people"), would then marry Clifford and become rich. Harold is convicted and sentenced to gaol but escapes and is helped by an elderly couple to find Bess again. Meanwhile, Seth visits Hetty in London. She has become Clifford's mistress. After Harold rescues Seth from drowning, Seth decides to confess his crime so Harold will receive his inheritance and Clifford will get the punishment he deserves.

== Roles and original cast ==
- Harold Armytage – Wilson Barrett
- Clifford Armytage – E. S. Willard
- Seth Preene – Walter Speakman
- Jarvis – George Barrett
- Philosopher Jack – Charles Coote
- Irish Policeman – Barney Cullen
- Aubrey De Vere, Esq. – Arthur Scott
- Bess Marks – Miss Eastlake
- Hetty Preene – Emeline Ormsby
- Mrs. Jarvis – Mrs. Stephens
- Shakespeare Jarvis – Eugene Edwards
