= The Cock-Eyed World =

1929 film directed by Raoul Walsh

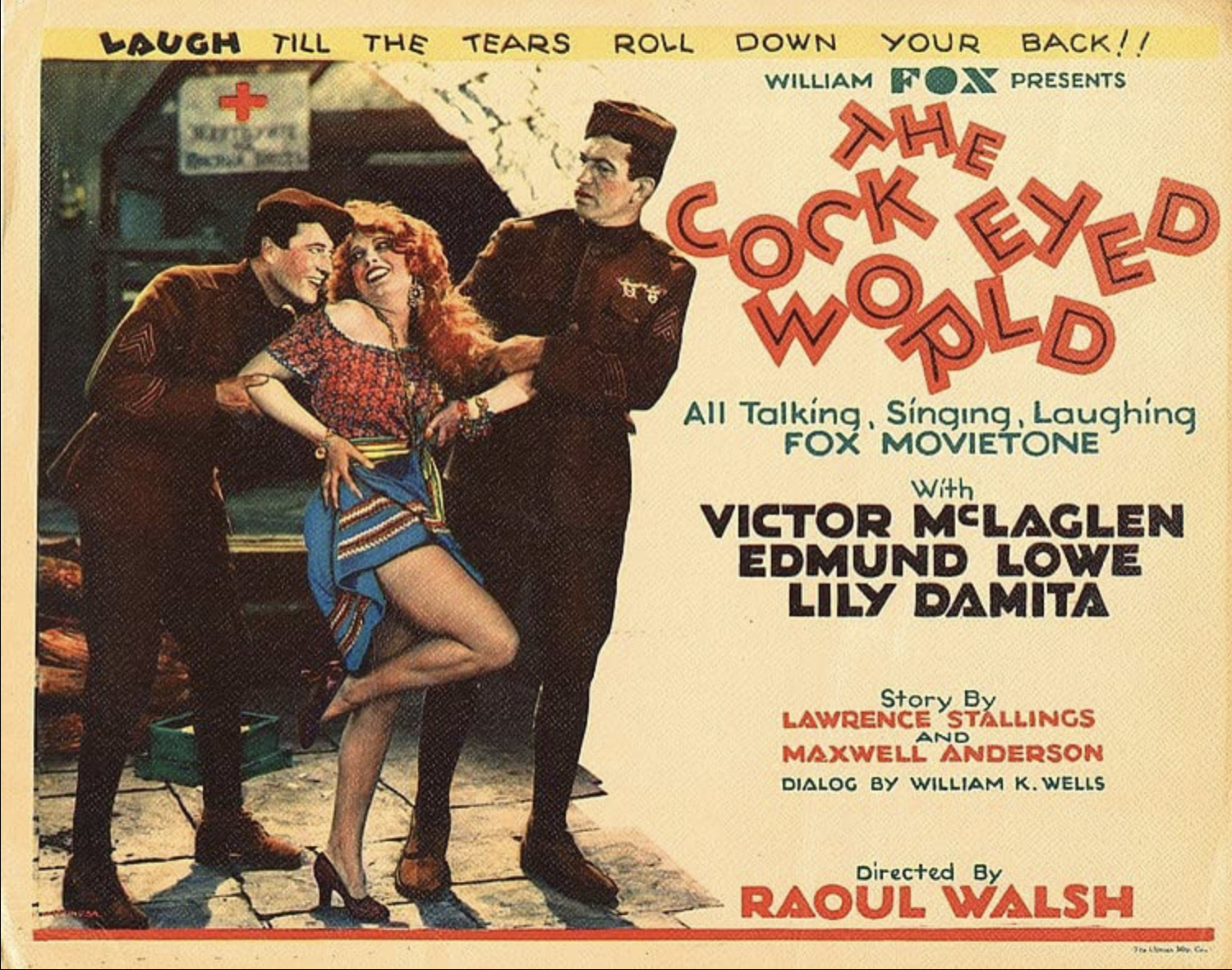
- Original film poster
- Directed by: Raoul Walsh
- Written by: Raoul Walsh; William K. Wells; Wilbur Morse Jr. Maxwell Anderson; Wilson Mizner; Laurence Stallings; Tom Barry
- Starring: Victor McLaglen; Edmund Lowe; Lili Damita
- Cinematography: Arthur Edeson
- Edited by: Jack Dennis
- Distributed by: Fox Film Corporation
- Release dates: August 3, 1929 (New York City, premiere); October 20, 1929 (US)
- Running time: 118 minutes
- Country: United States
- Language: English
- Box office: $2.7 million

The Cock-Eyed World is a 1929 American sound (All-Talking) pre-Code musical comedy feature film. One of the earliest "talkies", it was a sequel to What Price Glory? (1926), it was directed and written by Raoul Walsh and based on the Flagg and Quirt story by Maxwell Anderson, Tom Barry, Wilson Mizner, and Laurence Stallings. Fox Film Corporation released the film at the Roxy in New York on August 3, 1929.

The film stars Victor McLaglen and Edmund Lowe, reprising their original roles, as well as Lili Damita. The picture was also released in a silent version on October 5, 1929.

== Plot ==
The film

Flagg (Victor McLaglen) and Quirt (Edmund Lowe) find themselves transferred from Russia to Brooklyn to South America, in each place squaring off over a local beauty.

The film remains one of the earliest screen sequels to be a critical and popular success with the two lead actors playing the same characters, as well as the original writers and director intact from the first picture.

== Cast ==
- Victor McLaglen as Top Sergeant Flagg
- Edmund Lowe as Sergeant Harry Quirt
- Lili Damita as Mariana Elenita
- Leila Karnelly as Olga
- El Brendel as 'Yump' Olson
- Joe Brown as Brownie
- Stuart Erwin as Buckley

== Opening week record ==
According to Variety, the film beat every known gross for any box office attraction throughout the world with a reported first week gross of $173,391 at the Roxy. It grossed another record $173,667 in its second week.

== Gallery ==
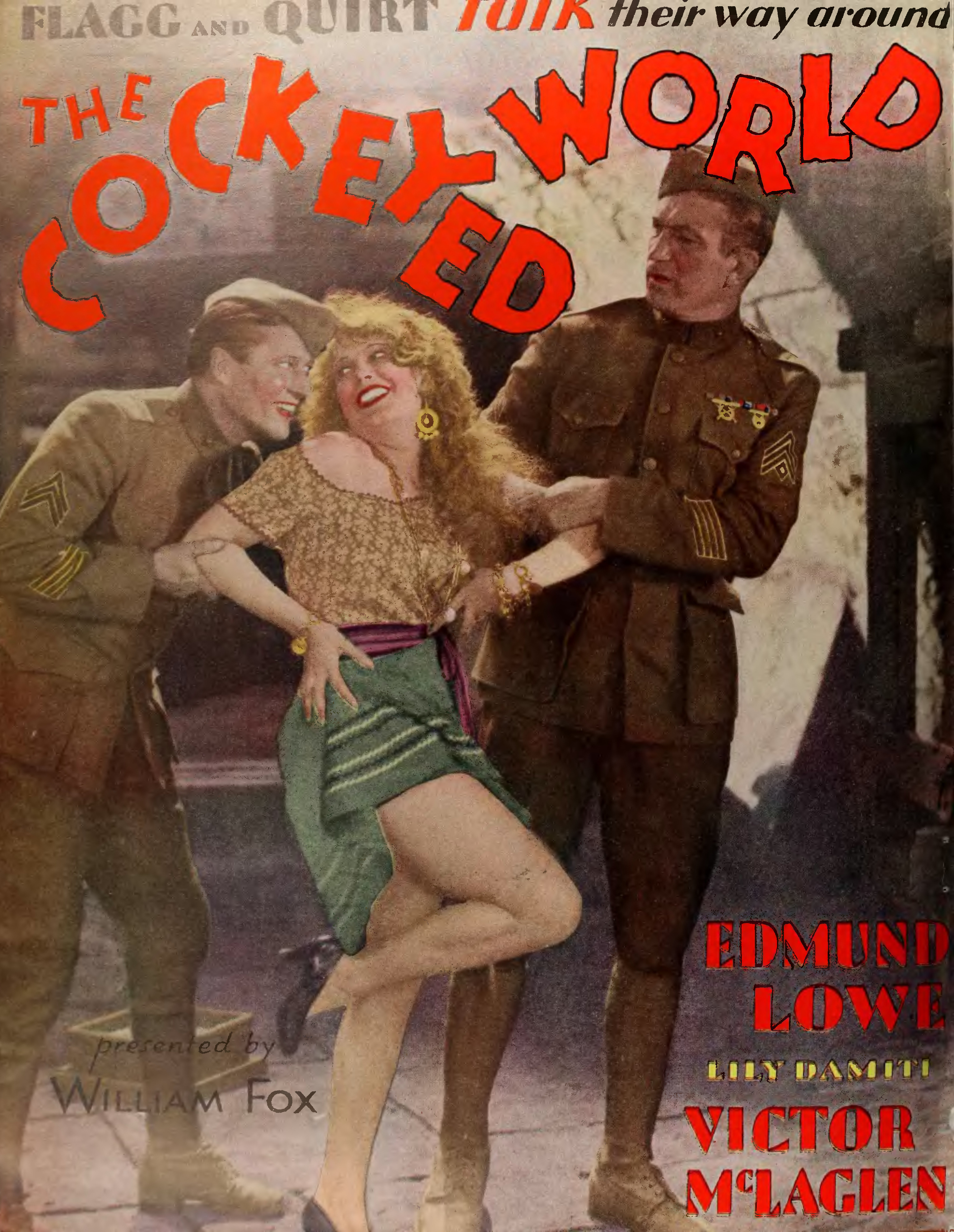
The Cock-Eyed World ad in The Film Daily, 1929

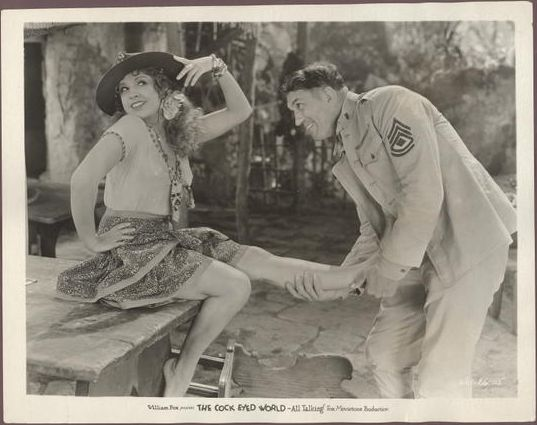
Damita and McLaglen

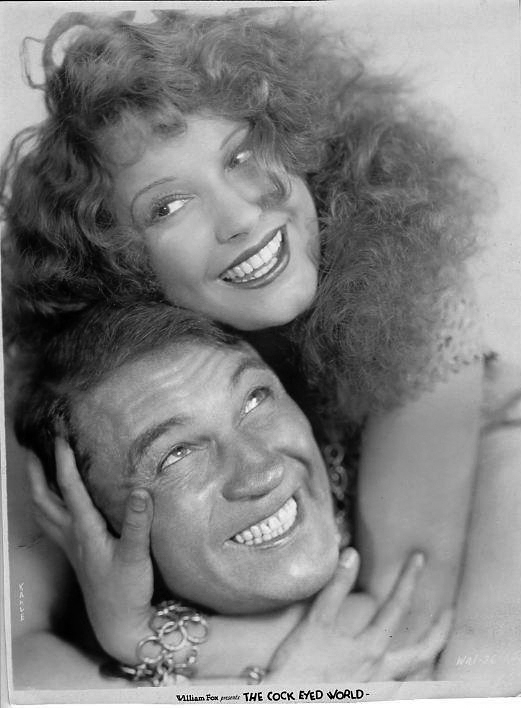
Lili Damita and Victor McLaglen in The Cock-Eyed World

== See also ==
- List of early sound feature films (1926–1929)
