= The Two Brides =

1919 film by Edward José

- Directed by: Edward Jose
- Written by: Alicia Ramsey (Original Screen Story); Margaret Turnbull (scenario)
- Produced by: Adolph Zukor; Jesse Lasky
- Starring: Lina Cavalieri
- Cinematography: Hal Young
- Distributed by: Paramount Pictures
- Release date: February 9, 1919
- Running time: 5 reels
- Country: United States
- Language: Silent film (English intertitles)

The Two Brides is a lost 1919 silent film drama produced by Famous Players–Lasky and distributed through Paramount Pictures. It was directed by Edward José and starred Opera singer Lina Cavalieri in her last motion picture. An original story for the screen was written by Alicia Ramsey.

== Cast ==
- Lina Cavalieri - Diana di Marchesi
- Courtenay Foote - Prince Marko
- Warburton Gamble - Count Gabrielle de Marchesi
- Hal Reid - Donata di Marchesi
- Mrs. Turner - Marchesi's Housekeeper
- Miss Richards - Young Wife
- James Sheridan - Boy (*billed as Sherry Tansey)
- Robert Milasch - Fisherman (*billed as R.E. Milash)
- Emil Roe - Doctor
