= As a Man Thinks =

1919 silent film

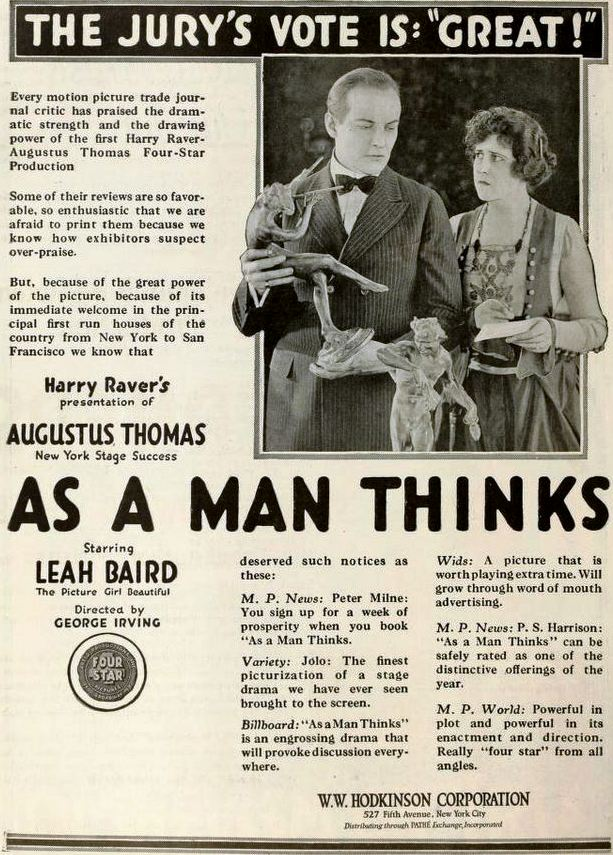
- Directed by: George Irving
- Written by: Augustus Thomas
- Based on: As a Man Thinks by Augustus Thomas
- Produced by: Harry Raver
- Starring: Leah Baird; Henry Clive; Warburton Gamble
- Cinematography: Arthur A. Cadwell
- Production company: Artco Productions
- Distributed by: Hodkinson Pictures; Pathe Exchange
- Release date: April 20, 1919
- Running time: 50 minutes
- Country: United States
- Languages: Silent; English intertitles

As a Man Thinks is a lost 1919 American silent drama film directed by George Irving and starring Leah Baird, Henry Clive and Warburton Gamble. It is adapted from the 1911 Broadway play As a Man Thinks by Augustus Thomas.

== Cast ==
- Leah Baird as Elinor Clayton
- Henry Clive as Frank Clayton
- Warburton Gamble as Benjamin De Lota
- Charles Brandt as Dr. Seelig
- Betty Howe as Vedah Seelig
- A.J. Herbert as Burrell
- Elaine Amazar as Mimi Chardenet
- Joseph W. Smiley as Mr. Hoover
- Jane Jennings as Mrs. Hoover
- Baby Ivy Ward as Dick Clayton

== Preservation ==
With no holdings located in archives, As a Man Thinks is considered a lost film.

== Bibliography ==
- Goble, Alan. The Complete Index to Literary Sources in Film. Walter de Gruyter, 1999.
