= Blanche Earle =

British-American actress and writer

Blanche "Bonnie" Earle (7 April 1882 - 22 January 1952) was a British-American actress and writer known for her roles in silent films Within the Law, The Battle Cry of Peace, and for writing the story for lost film The Dancer of the Nile. Earle was born as (and is sometimes credited as) Blanche Taylor in Yorkshire, England. She was the second wife of William P. S. Earle, who directed several of the films she wrote or appeared in. She wrote the script for the 1926 film, "El milagro de la Guadelupana," which William P. S. Earle shot on site in Mexico with his production company until debts forced his return. She died in Los Angeles in 1952.
