= Diane of the Follies =

1916 film

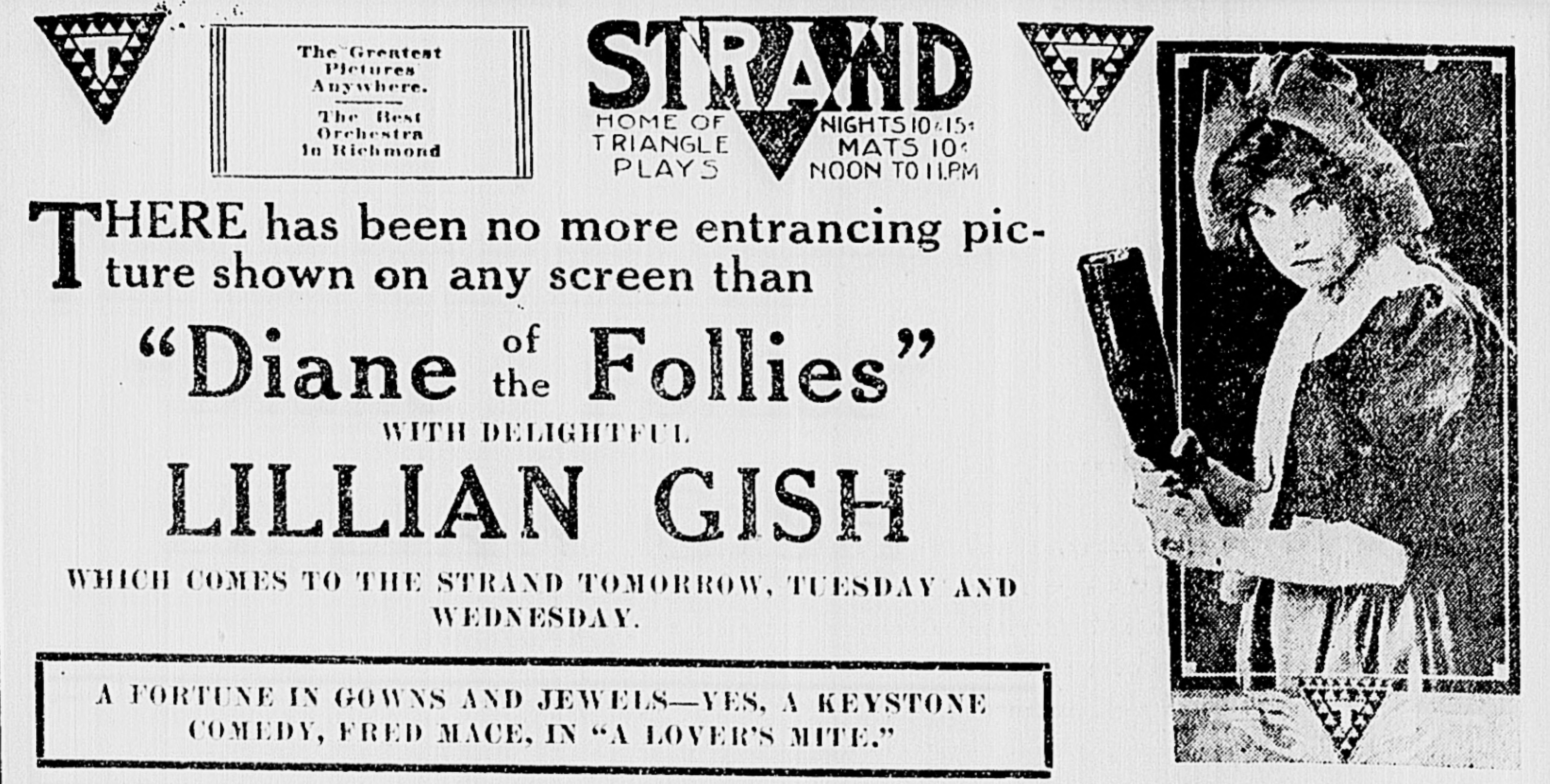
- Newspaper advert for the film
- Directed by: Christy Cabanne
- Written by: D. W. Griffith (as Granville Warwick)
- Produced by: Fine Arts Film Company
- Starring: Lillian Gish
- Distributed by: Triangle Film Corporation
- Release date: September 24, 1916
- Running time: 50 minutes
- Country: United States
- Languages: Silent; English intertitles

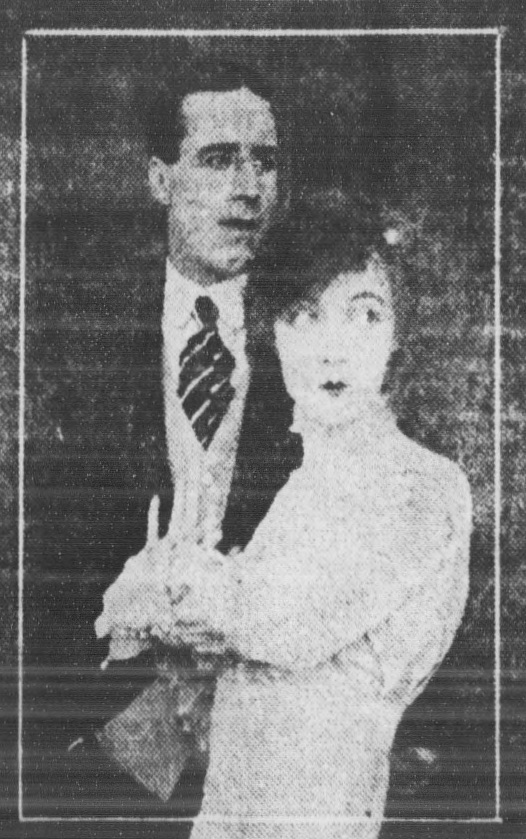
Scene from the film featuring Lillian Gish and Howard Gaye.

Diane of the Follies is a 1916 American drama film directed by Christy Cabanne. The film is considered to be lost.

== Cast ==
- Lillian Gish in the role of Diane
- Sam De Grasse in the role of Phillips Christy
- Howard Gaye in the role of Don Livingston
- Lillian Langdon in the role of Marcia Christy
- Allan Sears in the role of Jimmie Darcy (as A.D. Sears)
- Wilbur Higby in the role of Theatrical Manager
- William De Vaull in the role of Butler
- Wilhelmina Siegmann in the role of Bijou Christy
- Adele Clifton in the role of Follies Girl
- Clara Morris in the role of Follies Girl
- Helen Wolcott in the role of Follies Girl
- Grace Heins in the role of Follies Girl

== See also ==
- Lillian Gish filmography
