= An Adventure in Hearts =

1919 film directed by James Cruze

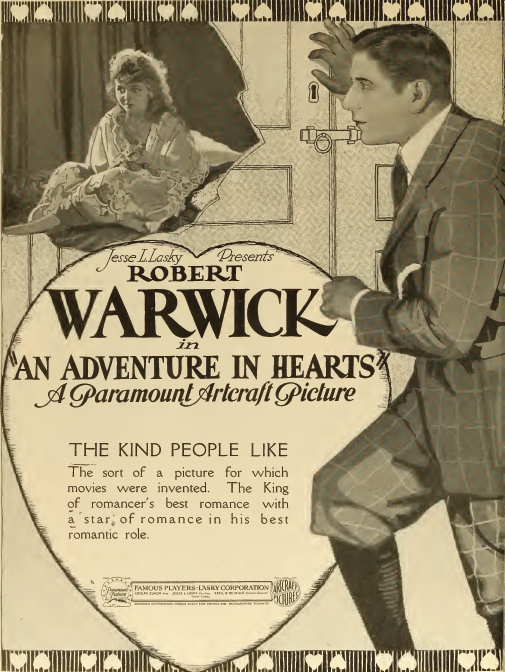
- Advertisement
- Directed by: James Cruze
- Screenplay by: Elmer Blaney Harris (scenario)
- Based on: Captain Dieppe by Anthony Hope
- Produced by: Jesse L. Lasky
- Starring: Robert Warwick; Juan de la Cruz; Winifred Greenwood; Helene Chadwick
- Cinematography: Charles Edgar Schoenbaum; Frank Urson
- Production company: Famous Players–Lasky Corporation
- Distributed by: Paramount Pictures
- Release date: December 7, 1919
- Running time: 50 minutes
- Country: United States
- Language: Silent (English intertitles)

An Adventure in Hearts is a lost 1919 American silent adventure film directed by James Cruze and written by Elmer Blaney Harris based upon the 1918 novel Captain Dieppe by Anthony Hope and the resulting play by Hope and Harrison Garfield Rhodes. The film stars Robert Warwick, Juan de la Cruz, Winifred Greenwood, Helene Chadwick, Walter Long, and Howard Gaye. The film was released on December 7, 1919, by Paramount Pictures.

== Cast ==
- Robert Warwick as Captain Dieppe
- Juan de la Cruz as Count Fieramondi
- Winifred Greenwood as Countess Fieramondi
- Helene Chadwick as Countess Lucia Bonavia D'Orano
- Walter Long as Guilamo Sevier
- Howard Gaye as Paul Sharpe

== Production ==
Originally produced under its novel title Captain Dieppe, it was retitled An Adventure in Hearts shortly before release. Portions of the film were shot on location in Kernville, California. Filming began in mid-July and would have wrapped up by mid-August due to Robert Warwick's upcoming film commitment, The Tree of Knowledge.

== Preservation ==
With no holdings located in archives, An Adventure in Hearts is considered a lost film.
