= The Dancer of the Nile =

1923 film

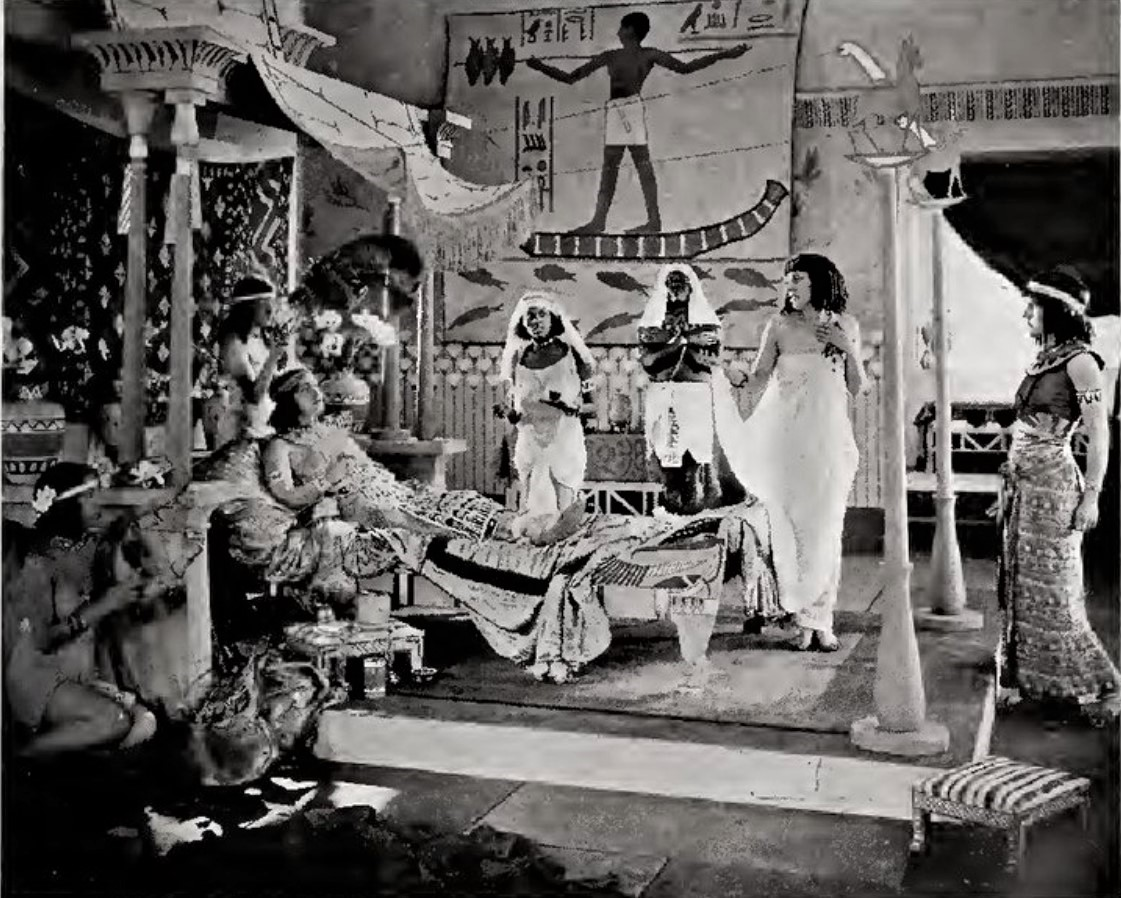
- Still with the Princess and her attendants
- Directed by: William P.S. Earle
- Written by: Blanche Earle; William P.S. Earle
- Starring: Carmel Myers; Malcolm McGregor; Sam De Grasse
- Cinematography: Jules Cronjager
- Production company: William P.S. Earle Productions
- Distributed by: Film Booking Offices of America
- Release date: October 28, 1923
- Running time: 60 minutes
- Country: United States
- Language: Silent (English intertitles)

The Dancer of the Nile is a 1923 American silent drama film directed by William P.S. Earle and starring Carmel Myers, Malcolm McGregor, and Sam De Grasse. The film was produced in response to the public fascination following the discovery of the tomb of Tutankhamun in November 1922.

== Plot ==
As described in a film magazine review, an Egyptian Princess is infatuated with Karmet, a Syrian prince who is disguised as a merchant. He, however, loves Arvia, a dancer. The Princess plots to sacrifice Arvia to the sacred crocodiles. Arvia is saved by her father and united to Karmet. The princess weds Prince Tut, who afterwards becomes King of Egypt.

== Cast ==
- Carmel Myers as Arvia
- Malcolm McGregor as Karmet
- Sam De Grasse as Pasheri
- Bertram Grassby as Prince Tut
- June Elvidge as The Princess
- Iris Ashton as Mimitta
- Howard Gaye as Pharaoh
- Gretchen Waterman as Little Girl (uncredited)

== Production ==
To give the film an authentic historical look, the film used double exposures on detailed paintings with blacked areas where actors would be added, and by filming through transparent painted glass for the background settings. Originally titled Tutankhamen and produced after the discovery of the tomb of Tutankhamun in November 1922, distributors in belief that public interest in the Egyptian king had waned requested a change in the title and plot. As a result, the film was edited to change its focus from Prince Tut to the dancer Arvia.

== Preservation ==
With no copies of The Dancer of the Nile located in any film archives, it is a lost film.

== Bibliography ==
- Bryan, Bruce (October 1924). "Movie Realism and Archaeological Fact". Art and Archaeology. 18 (4). Washington, D.C.: Archaeological Institute of America: 131–144.
- Cortlett, Dudley S. (December 1923). "Art on the Screen; or the Film of Tutankhamen". Art and Archaeology. 16 (6). Washington, D.C.: Archaeological Institute of America: 231–240.
- Munden, Kenneth White (1997). The American Film Institute Catalog of Motion Pictures Produced in the United States, Part 1. University of California Press.
