= Bonnie Prince Charlie (1923 film) =

Lost 1923 British historical film by Charles Calvert

- Directed by: Charles Calvert
- Written by: Alicia Ramsey
- Starring: Ivor Novello; Gladys Cooper; A.B. Imeson; Hugh Miller
- Production company: British Screencraft
- Distributed by: Gaumont British
- Release date: November 1923
- Running time: 6540 feet (7 reels)
- Country: United Kingdom
- Languages: Silent film English intertitles

Bonnie Prince Charlie is a 1923 British silent historical film directed by Charles Calvert and starring Ivor Novello, Gladys Cooper, and Hugh Miller. It is now considered a lost film.

== Premise ==
The film depicts the Jacobite Rebellion of 1745 and its aftermath when the Jacobite pretender Charles Edward Stuart evaded capture by the forces loyal to the Hanoverians, and escaped to the Continental Europe with the help of Flora MacDonald.

== Cast ==
- Ivor Novello as Prince Charles Stuart
- Gladys Cooper as Flora MacDonald
- A.B. Imeson as the Duke of Cumberland
- Hugh Miller as Robert Fraser
- Sydney Seaward as Neal McEachinn
- Benson Kleve as Donald MacPherson
- Adeline Hayden Coffin as Lady Clanronald
- Arthur Wontner as Lord Kingsburgh
- Nancy Price as Lady Kingsburgh
- Lewis Gilbert as George II of Great Britain
- A. Bromley Davenport as Sir John Cope
- Mollita Davies as Betty Burke
- Robert Laing as MacDonald
- Arthur McLaglen as MacKintosh

== Production ==
While filming on location in the Scottish Highlands, Novello grew so fond of his kilt that he continued to wear it even when he was off set.

== Bibliography ==
- Macnab, Geoffrey. Searching for Stars: Stardom and Screen Acting in British Cinenma. Cassell, 2000.
- Williams, Michael. Ivor Novello: Screen Idol. BFI, 2003.
