= La Belle Russe =

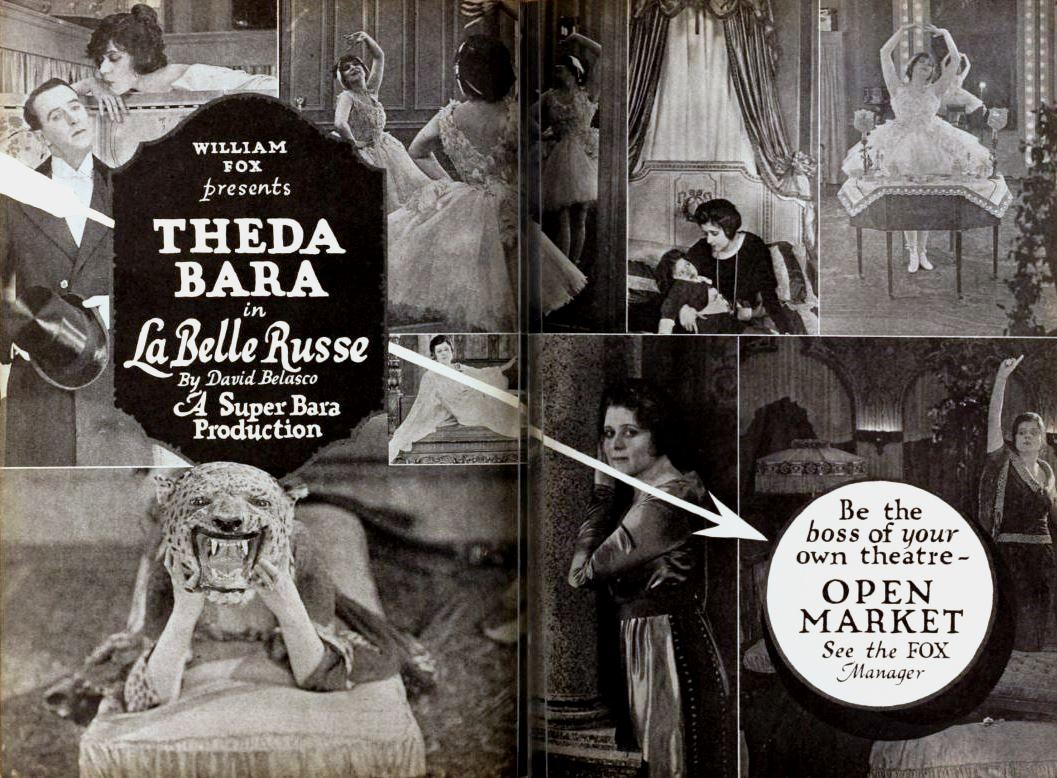
- Advertisement for the La Belle Russe on pages 12 and 13 of the Exhibitors Herald (August 30, 1919)
- Directed by: Charles Brabin
- Written by: Charles Brabin (scenario)
- Based on: La Belle Russe by David Belasco
- Starring: Theda Bara; Warburton Gamble; Marian Stewart; Robert Lee Keeling; William B. Davidson; Alice Wilson
- Cinematography: George W. Lane
- Production company: Fox Film Corporation
- Distributed by: Fox Film Corporation
- Release date: September 21, 1919
- Running time: 6 reels
- Country: United States
- Languages: Silent film (English intertitles)

La Belle Russe is a 1919 American silent romantic drama film directed by Charles Brabin and starring Theda Bara, Warburton Gamble, Marian Stewart, Robert Lee Keeling, William B. Davidson, and Alice Wilson. It is based on the 1882 play of the same name by David Belasco, which was previously adapted for the screen in 1914. The film was released by Fox Film Corporation on September 21, 1919.

== Cast ==
- Theda Bara as Fleurette Sackton / La Belle Russe
- Warburton Gamble as Phillip Sackton
- Marian Stewart as Phillip Sackton Jr.
- Robert Lee Keeling as Sir James Sackton
- William B. Davidson as Brand
- Alice Wilson as Lady Sackton
- Robert Vivian as Butler

== Preservation ==
The film is now considered lost, being among the films whose last copies were destroyed in the 1937 Fox vault fire, like most of Theda Bara's filmography.

== See also ==
- List of lost films
