= Lili Damita =

French-American actress (1904–1994)

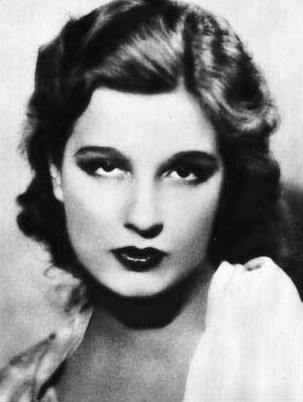
- Stars of the Photoplay, 1930
- Born: Liliane Marie-Madeleine Carré; 10 July 1904; Blaye, France
- Died: 21 March 1994 (aged 89); Palm Beach, Florida, U.S.
- Resting place: Oakland Cemetery, Fort Dodge, Iowa
- Other names: Lily Damita; Lily Deslys
- Years active: 1922–1937
- Spouses: Errol Flynn (m. 1935; div. 1942) Allen Loomis (m. 1962; div. 1983)
- Children: Sean Flynn

Lili Damita (born Liliane Marie-Madeleine Carré; 10 July 1904 – 21 March 1994) was a French-American actress, singer, and dancer who appeared in 33 films between 1922 and 1937.

== Early life and education ==
Lili Damita was born in Blaye, France, on 10 July 1904. Her father was an officer. She was educated in convents and ballet schools in her native France, as well as Spain and Portugal. At 14, she was enrolled as a dancer at the Paris Opera.

== Early career in revue, modeling and German film ==
As a teenager, she was performing in popular music halls, eventually appearing in the Revue at the Casino de Paris. She worked as a photographic model. Offered a role in film as a prize for winning a magazine beauty competition in 1921, she appeared in several silent films before being offered her first leading role in Das Spielzeug von Paris (1925) by Hungarian-born director Michael Curtiz. She was an instant success, and Curtiz directed her in two more films: Fiaker Nr. 13 (1926) and Der goldene Schmetterling (1926). Damita continued appearing next in German productions directed by Robert Wiene (Die große Abenteuerin; 1928), G.W. Pabst (Man spielt nicht mit der Liebe; 1926) and British director Graham Cutts (The Queen Was in the Parlour; 1927).

== Hollywood career ==
In 1928, Damita was invited to Hollywood by Samuel Goldwyn and made her American film debut in The Rescue. She was leased out to various studios, appearing with stars and leading men such as Maurice Chevalier, Laurence Olivier, James Cagney, Gary Cooper and Cary Grant. Her films included box office successes The Cock-Eyed World (1929), the semi-silent The Bridge of San Luis Rey (1929) and This Is the Night (1932).

== Personal life ==
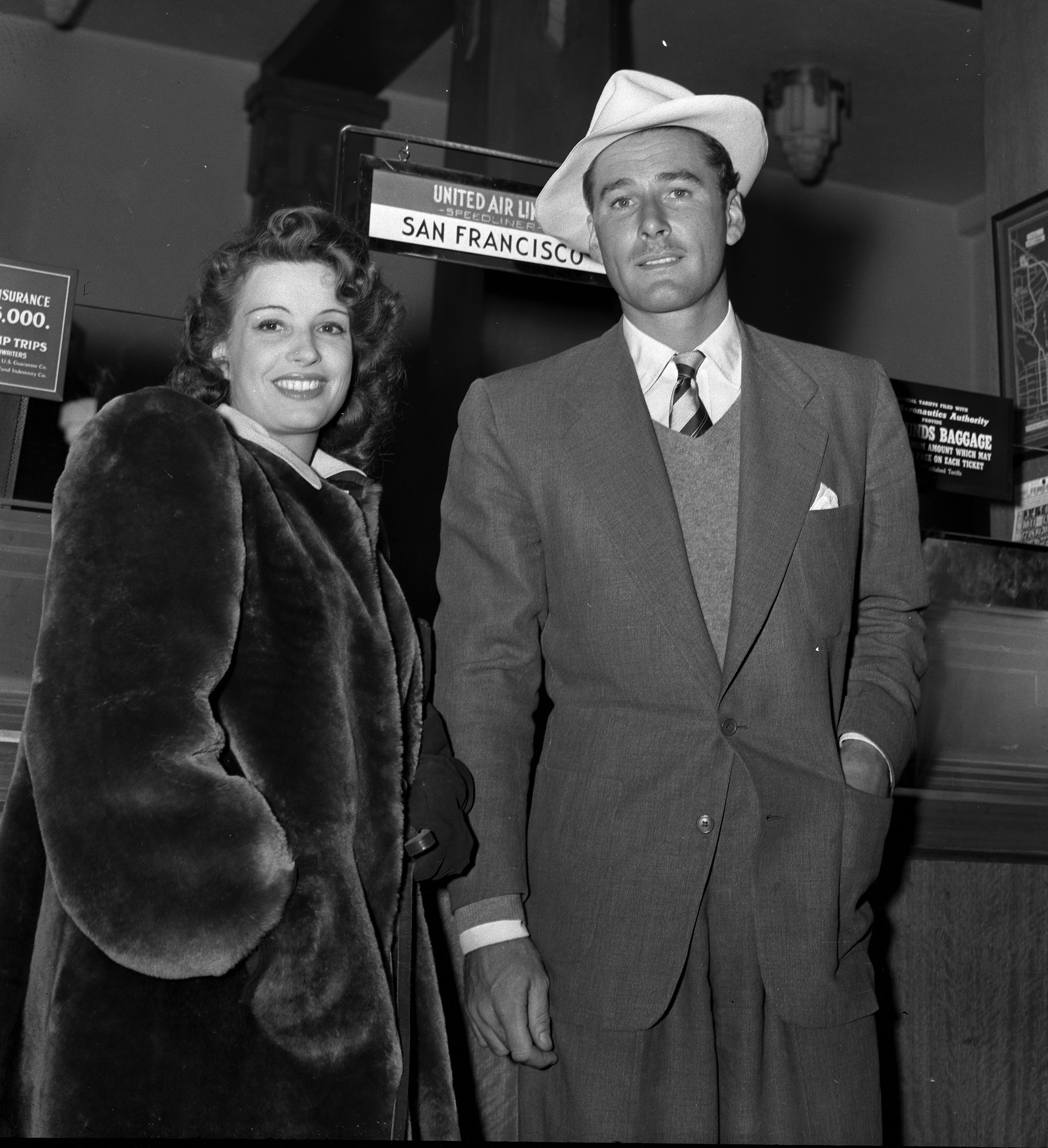
Damita and husband Errol Flynn at Los Angeles airport, 1941

Following a lengthy affair with Curtiz, and a relationship with Prince Louis Ferdinand of Prussia, grandson of Kaiser Wilhelm II, she married the then-unknown actor Errol Flynn in 1935 and retired from the screen. Flynn soon became one of Hollywood's biggest box office attractions, and in 1941 they had a son, Sean Flynn. The couple had an acrimonious divorce in 1942. According to her ex husband's memoir My Wicked, Wicked Ways, Damita was unstable and violent throughout the tumultuous relationship. She is portrayed by Barbara Hershey in the 1985 TV movie based on the book.

In 1962, while living in Palm Beach, Florida, Damita married Allen Loomis, a retired Fort Dodge, Iowa, dairy product manufacturer, and spent part of each year living there. They divorced in the mid-80s.

During the Cambodian Civil War (Khmer Rouge reign), her son Sean Flynn was working as a freelance photo journalist under contract to Time magazine when he and fellow journalist Dana Stone were reported missing on the road south of Phnom Penh, Cambodia, on 6 April 1970. Although Damita spent an enormous amount of money searching for her son, he was never found, and in 1984 he was declared legally dead.

== Death ==
Damita died of Alzheimer's disease on 21 March 1994, in Palm Beach, Florida, aged 89. She was interred in the Oakland Cemetery in Fort Dodge, Iowa, her last husband's hometown.

== Selected filmography ==
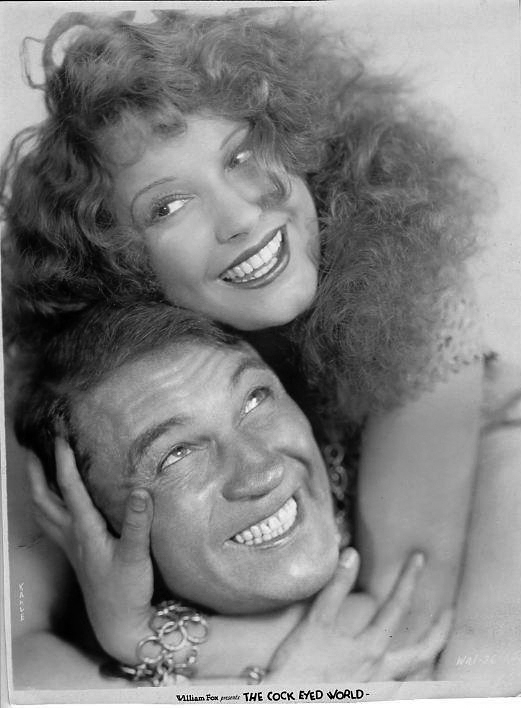
Promotional photo of Damita and Victor McLaglen for The Cock-Eyed World (1929)

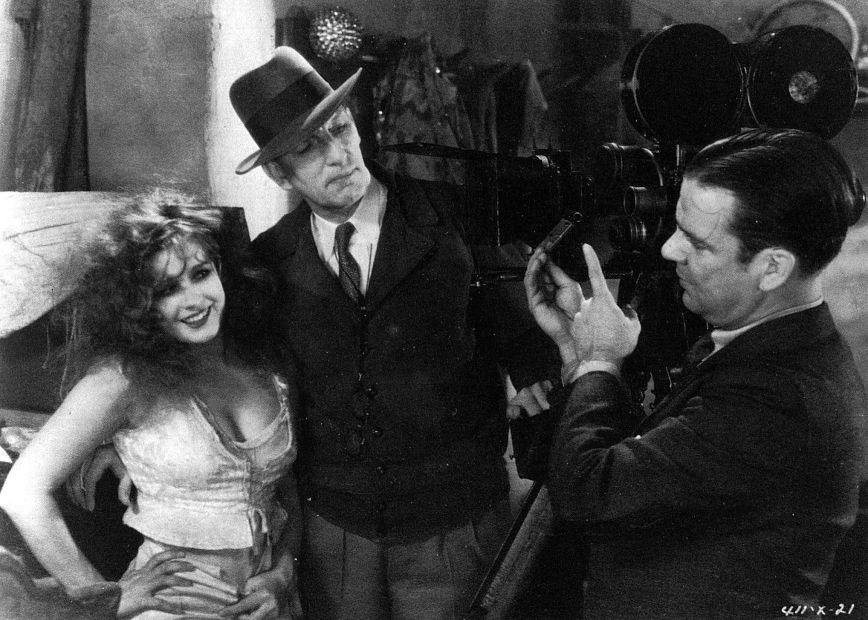
The Bridge of San Luis Rey (1929)

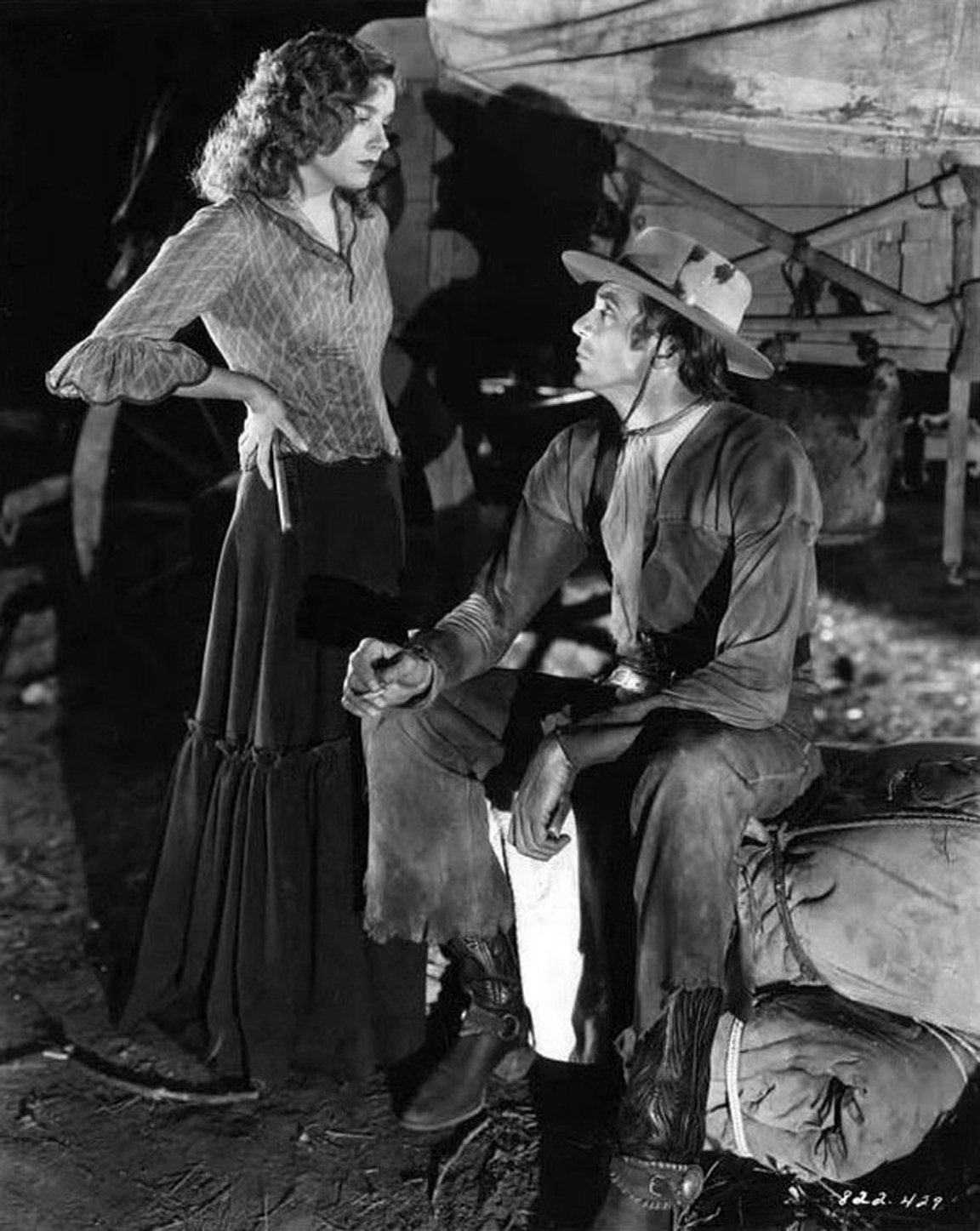
Damita and Gary Cooper in Fighting Caravans (1931)

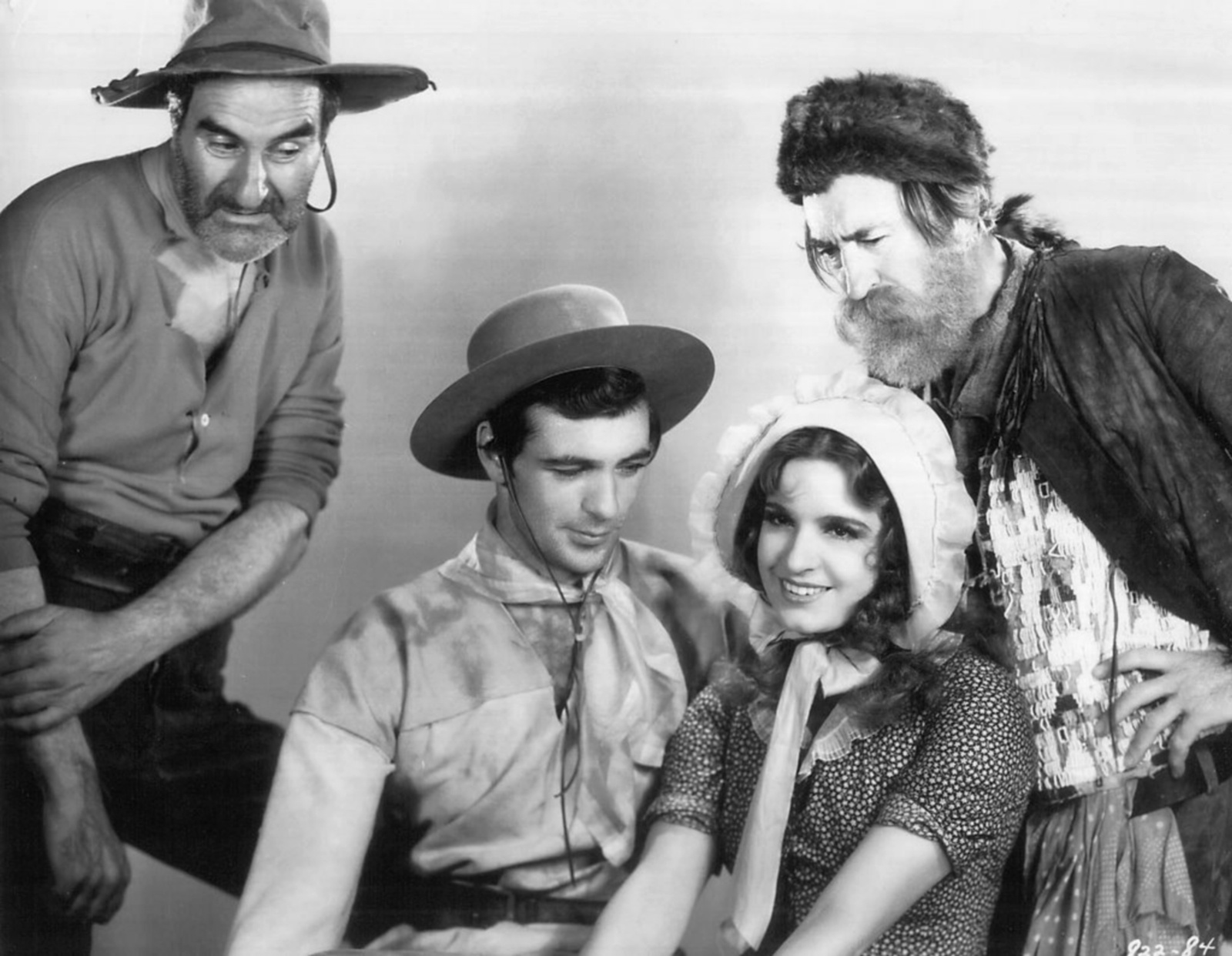
With Ernest Torrence, Gary Cooper, and Tully Marshall in Fighting Caravans (1931)

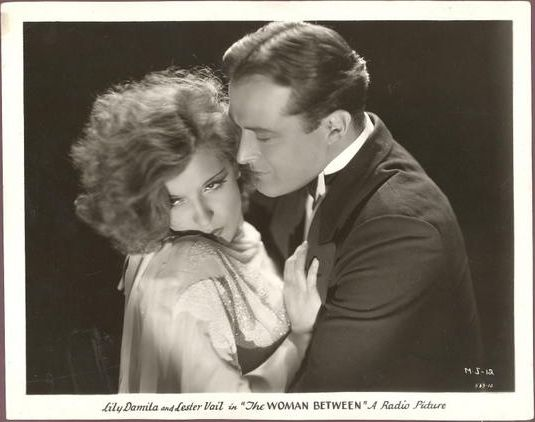
With Lester Vail in The Woman Between (1931)

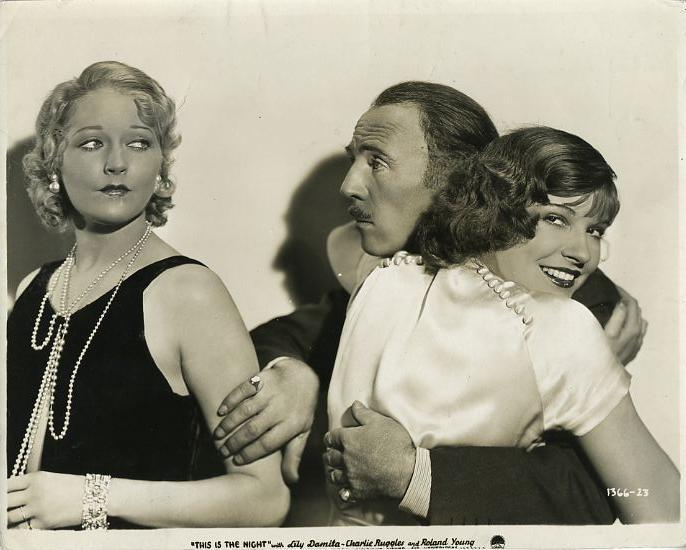
Thelma Todd, Roland Young, Lili Damita in This Is the Night (1932)

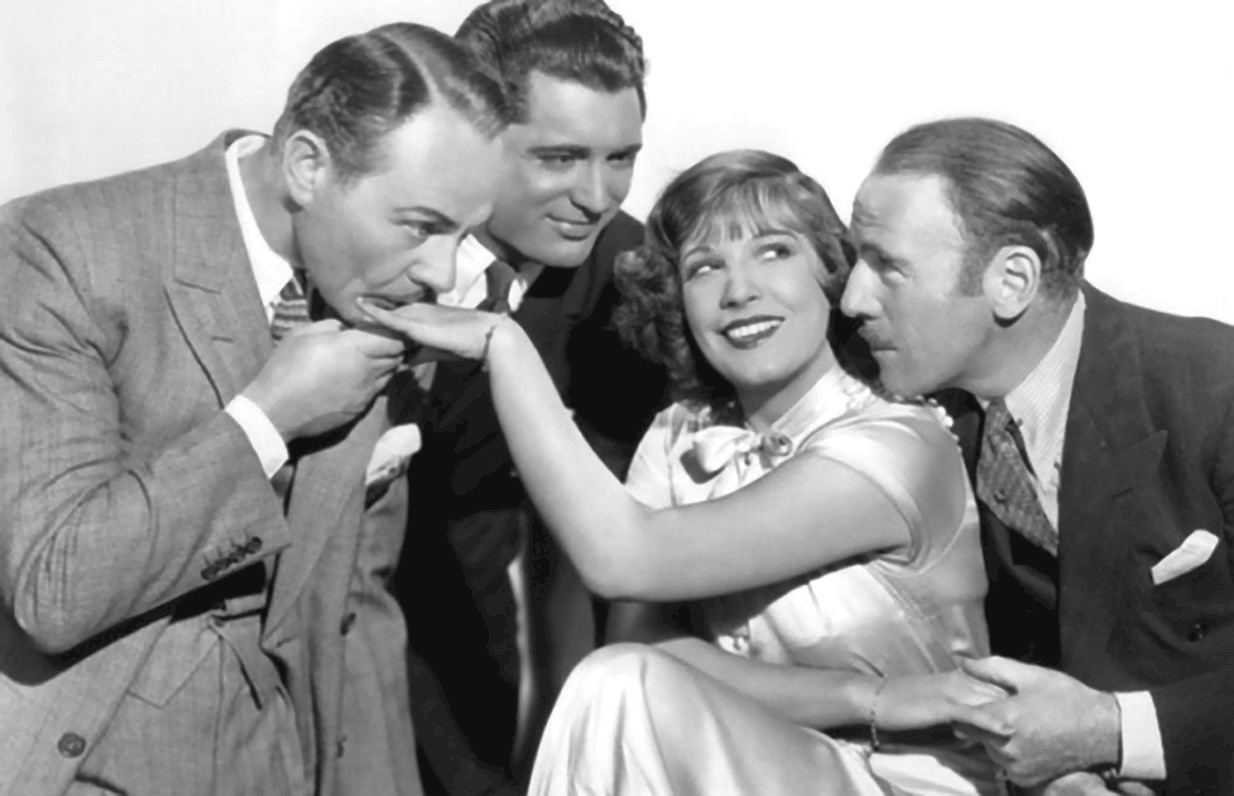
Charles Ruggles, Cary Grant, Lili Damita and Roland Young in This Is the Night (1932)

Year	Film	Role	Notes
1922	Maman Pierre		
1922	La belle au bois dormant		
1922	L'Empereur des pauvres	Riquette	
1922	La fille sauvage	Henriette Villedieu	
1923	Corsica		
1924	Une femme dans la nuit		
1924	The Clairvoyant	Suzanne	
1925	Prince Charming		
1925	Das Spielzeug von Paris	Célimène aka Susana Armard	
1926	Fiaker Nr. 13 (Cab No. 13)	Lilian	
1926	Geheimnisse einer Seele (Secrets of a Soul)		Uncredited
1926	Der goldene Schmetterling (The Golden Butterfly)	Lilian	
1926	Man spielt nicht mit der Liebe (One Does Not Play with Love)	Calixta	Lost film
1927	The Queen Was in the Parlour	Prinzessin Nadya von Kraya	
1927	Die berühmte Frau (The Famous Woman)	Sonja Litowskaja	
1928	Die große Abenteuerin (The Great Adventuress)		
1928	Scandal in Paris		
1929	The Rescue	Lady Edith Travers	Incomplete film
1929	The Bridge of San Luis Rey	Camila (La Perichole)	Filmed as both silent and part-talkie, only the silent version of this film survives
1929	The Cock-Eyed World	Mariana Elenita	
1930	Let Us Be Gay (Soyons gais)	Kitty	alternate language version
1931	The Bachelor Father (Le père célibataire)	Viviette	alternate language version
1931	Fighting Caravans	Felice	
1931	The Woman Between	Julie Whitcomb	
1931	Friends and Lovers	Mrs. Alva Sangrito	
1932	This Is the Night	Germaine	
1932	One Hour with You (Une heure près de toi)	Mitzi Olivier	alternate language version
1932	The Match King	Marta Molnar	
1933	Goldie Gets Along	Goldie LaFarge	
1934	A Man Has Been Stolen	Annette	
1935	Brewster's Millions	Rosalie La Rue	
1935	Frisco Kid	Belle Morra	
1936	The Devil on Horseback	Diane Corday	
1937	Escadrille of Chance	Edwige	

== Selected stage musicals ==
- On Dit Ça, Paris (1923)
- Sons o'Guns, New York (1929/30)
- Here's How, London (1934)

== Bibliography ==
- Bermingham, Cedric Osmond (1931). Stars of the screen 1931: A volume of biographies of contemporary actors and actresses engaged in photoplay throughout the world. London, UK: Herbert Joseph.
- "Lily Damita". Stars of the Photoplay. Chicago: Photoplay Magazine. 1930.
