= Lights of London (1923 film) =

1923 film

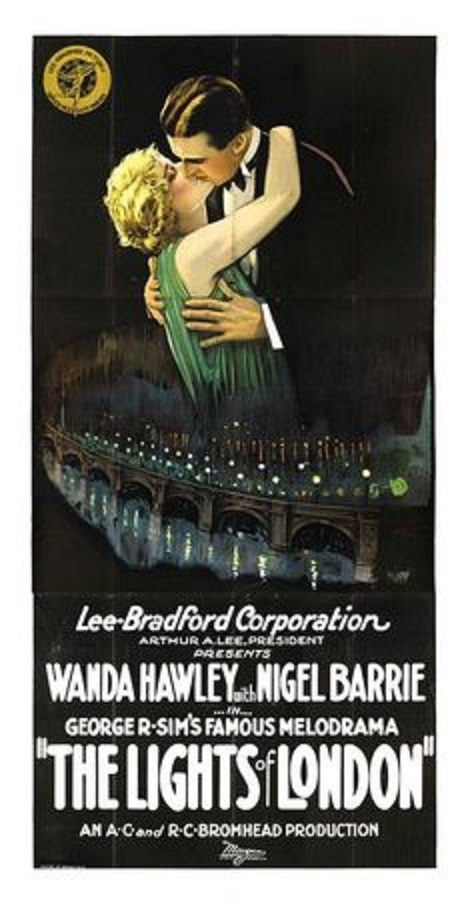
- Directed by: Charles Calvert
- Written by: George R. Sims (play); Louis Stevens
- Produced by: A.C. Bromhead
- Starring: Wanda Hawley; Nigel Barrie; Warburton Gamble; James Lindsay
- Production company: British Screencraft
- Distributed by: Gaumont British Distributors
- Release date: September 1923
- Running time: 7,386 feet
- Country: United Kingdom
- Language: English

Lights of London is a 1923 British silent drama film directed by Charles Calvert and starring Wanda Hawley, Nigel Barrie and Warburton Gamble. The film is based on the 1881 stage melodrama The Lights o' London by George Sims and was made at the Lime Grove Studios. It revolves around a rich heir who is framed by his cousin and sent to jail.

== Cast ==
- Wanda Hawley as Bess Marks
- Nigel Barrie as Harold Armytage
- Warburton Gamble as Clifford Armytage
- James Lindsay as Seth Preene
- Mary Clare as Hetty Preene
- Cecil Morton York as Sir Oliver Armytage
- Dorothy Fane as Belle
- A. Harding Steerman as Bertram Marks
- H.R. Hignett as Simon Jarvis
- Mary Brough as Mrs. Jarvis

== Reception ==
Variety called it a "very ordinary and mediocre drama" and a "disappointment throughout" in spite of "several excellent performances."

== Bibliography ==
- Low, Rachael. History of the British Film, 1918-1929. George Allen & Unwin, 1971.
