= The Queen Was in the Parlour (film) =

1927 film by Graham Cutts

- Directed by: Graham Cutts
- Written by: Fanny Carlsen; Graham Cutts
- Produced by: Michael Balcon; Hermann Fellner; Arnold Pressburger; Josef Somlo
- Starring: Lili Damita; Louis Ralph; Paul Richter; Harry Liedtke
- Cinematography: Otto Kanturek
- Music by: Gustav Gold
- Production companies: Gainsborough Pictures; UFA
- Distributed by: Woolf & Freedman Film Service
- Release date: April 1927
- Running time: 7,250 feet
- Countries: United Kingdom; Germany
- Languages: Silent; English intertitles German intertitles

The Queen Was in the Parlour is a 1927 Anglo-German silent drama film directed by Graham Cutts and starring Lili Damita, Louis Ralph and Paul Richter. It was based on the Noël Coward play The Queen Was in the Parlour. Its German title was Die letzte Nacht.

== Production ==
The film was made as part of an Anglo-German co-production between Gainsborough Pictures and the leading German company UFA. It was shot at UFA's Babelsberg Studio in Berlin. It was the first of several co-productions between Gainsborough and German companies.

== Cast ==
- Lili Damita as Nadya
- Louis Ralph as Prince Alex
- Paul Richter as Sabien Pascal
- Harry Liedtke as Prince Keri
- Trude Hesterberg as Herzogin Xenia
- Rudolf Klein-Rogge as General Kish
- Ernő Verebes as King's Adjutant
- Frida Richard as Zana

== Bibliography ==
- Cook, Pam (ed.). Gainsborough Pictures. Casssell, 1997.
- Low, Rachael. History of the British Film, 1918-1929. George Allen & Unwin, 1971.
