= Howard Gaye =

British actor (1878–1955)

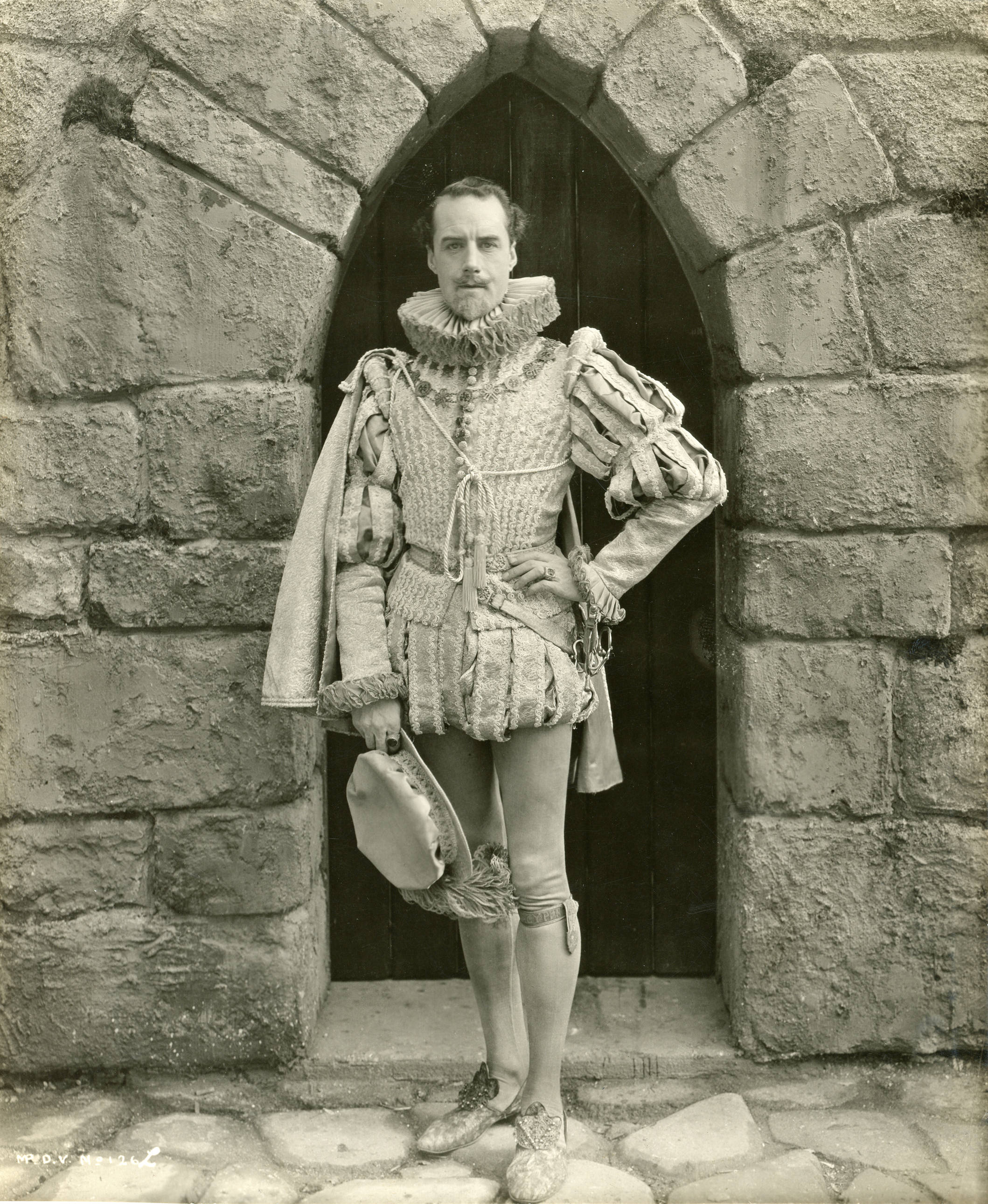
Gaye in Dorothy Vernon of Haddon Hall (1924).

Howard Gaye (23 May 1878 – 26 December 1955) was a British actor who worked mainly in the United States.

Gaye's father was a co-owner of the Gaiety Theatre in London. Before Gaye became an actor, he worked as a newspaper reporter in England. During a visit to the United States in 1912, he was invited to join the Kalem Company. After working there, he joined D. W. Griffith's stock company in 1914.

He acted in 27 silent films, including D. W. Griffith's epics The Birth of a Nation (1915) as Robert E. Lee and Intolerance (1916) as Jesus Christ.

Gaye also directed films for Mena.

In the early 1920s, Gaye taught acting at the Howard Gaye Studio of Screen Acting Technique. He said that even experienced stage actors needed to learn certain techniques if they wanted to adapt to acting in films.

Gaye was charged with violating the Mann Act in May 1923. A federal complaint charged that he took "Fanchon Duncan, said to be a movie-struck girl" to England, brought her back to the United States, and then deserted her. He was released under $2,500 bond.

After Gaye returned to England, he lectured about his Hollywood career. He wrote an autobiography, So This Was Hollywood, but it was not published.

== Partial filmography ==
- Home, Sweet Home (1914)
- The Birth of a Nation (1915) as Gen. Robert E. Lee
- Daphne and the Pirate (1916) as Prince Henri
- Flirting with Fate (1916) as Roland Dabney
- The Little School Ma'am (1916) as Old Man Tyler
- Intolerance (1916) as Jesus Christ / Cardinal de Lorraine
- The Devil's Needle (1916) as Sir Gordon Galloway
- Diane of the Follies (1916) as Don Livingston
- Everybody's Doing It (1916) as Society gentleman
- The Spirit of '76 (1917) as Lionel Esmond
- The Spy (1917) as Baron von Bergen
- The Scarlet Pimpernel (1917) as Lord Antony Dewhurst
- Restitution (1918) as Jesus, the man
- The Uplifters (1919) as Larry Holden
- An Adventure in Hearts (1919) as Paul Sharpe
- The Six Best Cellars (1920) as Tommy Blair
- Passion's Playground (1920) as James Hanaford
- A Slave of Vanity (1920) as Arthur Kane
- To Please One Woman (1920) as Leila's Husband
- My Lady's Latchkey (1921) as Lord Annesley-Seton
- What's a Wife Worth? (1921) as Henry Burton
- Sacred and Profane Love (1921) as Albert Vicary
- A Prince of Lovers (1922) as Lord Byron
- Scaramouche (1923) as Viscount d'Albert (uncredited)
- The Dancer of the Nile (1923) as Pharaoh
- Dante's Inferno (1924) as Virgil (final film role)
