= Alicia Ramsey =

British playwright and screenwriter

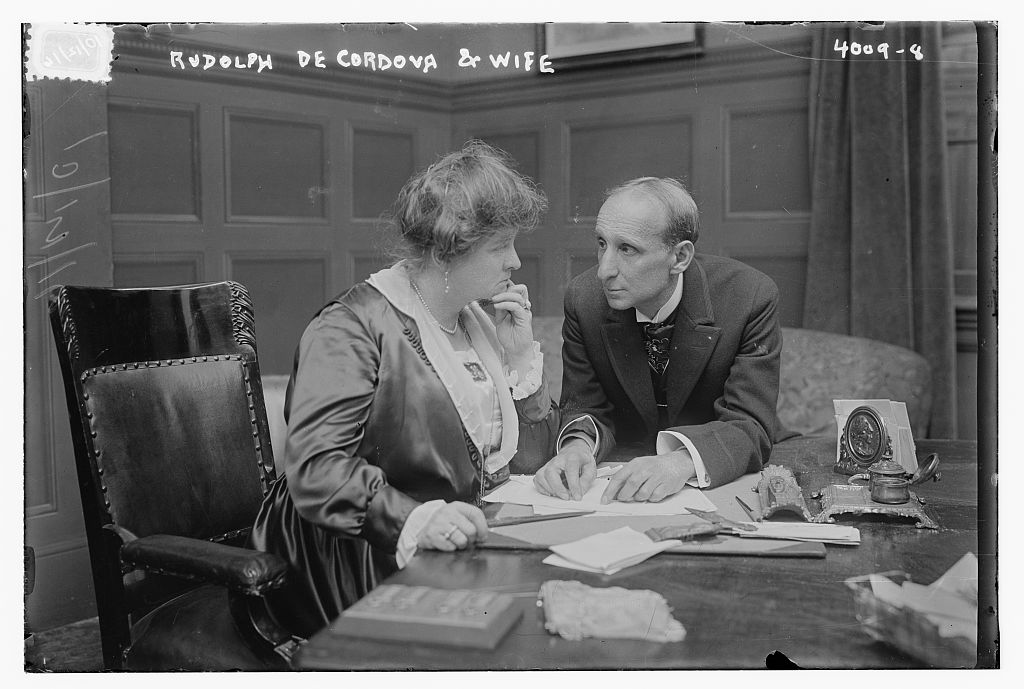
Ramsey and Rudolph de Cordova in 1916

Alicia Ramsey (1864–1933) was a British playwright and screenwriter.

She was born Alice Joanna Royston.

== Life ==
Alice Joanna Royston was born in Chelsea, the daughter of William Hayelett Royston, gentleman. She was educated in Oxford and Paris and trained as a pianist in Leipzig.

In 1891, in Kensington, she married Sanderson Henry Walker, who gave his occupation as Theatrical. Her pen name was taken from her husband's stage name, Cecil Ramsey. They had a son, Guy Haylett Walker (1900–1959), also known as Guy Ramsey, an author. Sanderson Henry Walker (or Ramsey) died in 1914, and in September 1916, in New York City, Alice, now Alicia Ramsey, married the Jamaican-born writer and actor Rudolph de Cordova, with whom she had been working for twenty years. He was the brother of another actor, Leander de Cordova.

Several of Ramsey's plays were turned into films, in the silent era.

When she died in 1933, Ramsey was living at 99, Oxford Gardens, North Kensington, and probate for her estate valued at £121 was granted to Cordova.

== Selected works ==
Plays

- The Redskins (1903)
- Byron (1908)
- Social Hypocrites (1918)

Screenplays

- Eve's Daughter (1918)
- The Two Brides (1919)
- The Spark Divine (1919)
- Rob Roy (1922)
- Silent Evidence (1922)
- Young Lochinvar (1923)
- The Money Habit (1924)
- The Desert Sheik (1924)
- The Love Story of Aliette Brunton (1924)
- The Presumption of Stanley Hay, MP (1925)
- King of the Castle (1925)
- One Colombo Night (1926)
