= Charles Calvert (director) =

British director of silent films

Charles Calvert was a British, silent-era film director. He was sometimes credited as C.C. Calvert or Captain Charles Calvert. Calvert had a reputation as a journeyman director who produced old-fashioned films.

== Selected filmography ==
- Disraeli (1916)
- The Ace of Hearts (1916)
- The Edge of Youth (1920)
- Walls of Prejudice (1920)
- A Prince of Lovers (1922)
- Bonnie Prince Charlie (1923)
- Lights of London (1923)

== Bibliography ==
- Bamford, Kenton. Distorted Images: British National Identity and Film in the 1920s. I.B. Tauris, 1999.
