= Wold Newton =

Wold Newton may refer to:

- Wold Newton, East Riding of Yorkshire, village in the Yorkshire Wolds, England
- Wold Newton, Lincolnshire, village in the Lincolnshire Wolds, England
- Wold Newton family, fictional creation of Philip José Farmer
