= Edward Topham =

English journalist and playwright

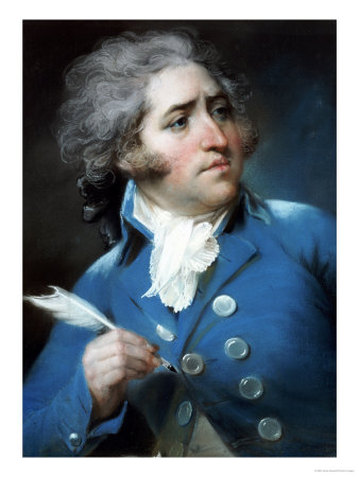
Edward Topham by John Russell, c. 1795

Edward Topham (1751–1820) was an English journalist and playwright, who publicized the Wold Cottage meteorite which fell on his property.

== Education and military career ==
He was the son of Francis Topham, LL.D. (d. 15 October 1770), Master of Faculties and judge of the Prerogative Court in York, whose feud with Dean Fountayne was lampooned by Laurence Sterne in The History of a Warm Watch Coat.

Edward was educated at Eton College under Dr. John Foster (1731–1774), and remained there for eleven years. While at school he dabbled in poetry and was one of the leaders in the rebellion against Foster's rule. He was admitted at Trinity College, Cambridge, as pensioner on 22 April 1767, and as fellow-commoner on 23 October 1769, but he left without taking a degree. On leaving the university, Topham travelled on the continent and spent six months in Scotland, publishing on his return in 1776 a volume of Letters from Edinburgh, 1774 and 1775, containing some Observations on the Diversions, Customs, Manners, and Laws of the Scotch Nation. He next came to London and purchased a commission in the First Regiment of Lifeguards. By 1777, he was "cornet of King George III's second Troop of Horse-guards", and for about seven years he was the adjutant. He brought his regiment to a high state of efficiency, for which he received the thanks of the King and figured in the press as "the tip-top adjutant". In 1803, he was made a Captain in The Yorkshire Wolds Gentlemen and Yeomanry Cavalry.

== Fashionable society ==
Topham soon became known in London's fashionable society for his original style of dress and the ease and elegance of his manners. His personal and sartorial peculiarities were copied by his friend Frederick Reynolds to enliven the characters in his comedies. Meanwhile, Topham's talent as a writer of prologues and epilogues introduced him to the leading actors of the day, and led to his first appearance as a playwright. An epilogue, spoken by Charles Lee Lewes in imitation of a Molière character, filled Drury Lane for several nights. Another, on a recent tragedy, spoken by Miss Farren, was equally popular. He wrote an epilogue for the benefit of Mary Wells, and their friendship soon became intimate. They lived together for several years, and four children resulted from the union.

The plays produced by Topham during this period of his life were:

- Deaf Indeed, acted at Drury Lane in December 1780, but not printed; called a "stupid and indecent" farce.
- The Fool, a farce in two acts, performed at Covent Garden, and printed in 1786, with a dedication to Mrs. Wells, owing to whose admirable portrayal of "Laura" it was well received.
- Small Talk, or the Westminster Boy, a farce, acted at Covent Garden for the benefit of Mrs. Wells on 11 May 1786, but not printed. The Westminster Boys resented this production and came to the theatre in force to prevent it from being heard.
- Bonds without Judgment, or the Loves of Bengal, acted for four nights at Covent Garden in May 1787, but not printed.

== Journalism ==
A daily paper called The World was established by Topham (partly with the object of promoting Mary Wells) on 1 January 1787. Two of his principal colleagues in its direction were Miles Peter Andrews and the Rev. Charles Este (died London 1828) Charles Este. John Bell, the publisher, had a share in the management. Its "unqualified and audacious attacks on all private characters" were at the start "smiled at for their quaintness, then tolerated for their absurdity", and ultimately repudiated with disgust. In it appeared accounts of "elopements, divorces, and suicides, tricked out in all the elegancies of Mr. Topham's phraseology". It was in this paper that the fantastic productions of the Della Cruscans, a small set of English poetasters dwelling for the most part at Florence, made their appearance. Topham contributed articles under the title of The Schools, in which he gave reminiscences of many of his companions at Eton, and his Life of the Late John Elwes, Esquire (1790) made its first appearance in its columns. This memoir of the miser (sometimes credited with being the inspiration for Ebenezer Scrooge) passed through seven editions during 1790, and in 1805 reached a twelfth edition, "corrected and enlarged, and with a new appendix". A German translation was published at Danzig in 1791. Horace Walpole considered it "one of the most amusing anecdotal books in the English language". It is said to have raised the sale of The World by a thousand copies a day; but an even better hit was made by the correspondence between the rival pugilists Richard Humphries and Daniel Mendoza.

=== Charges of libel ===
When George Nassau Clavering, Third Earl Cowper, died in Florence on 22 December 1789, his character was assailed with virulence in The World. Topham was indicted for libel, and the case was tried before Buller, who pronounced the articles to have been published with intent to throw scandal on the peer's family and as tending to a breach of the peace. The proprietor was found guilty. Counsel moved for an arrest of judgment on the ground of the misdirection of the judge to the jury. It was argued at great length before the Court of King's Bench, and after a protracted delay Kenyon delivered on 29 January 1791 the judgment of the court in favour of Topham (Charles Durnford and Edward East, Reports of Cases..., iv. 126–30). By the autumn of 1790, he and Este had separated in anger. The latter had acquired a fourth share in the paper, but had surrendered it from 25 December 1788, conditionally, on the payment of an annuity to him. Topham claimed that its payment was dependent on the existence of the paper, and Este thereupon "opened a literary battery against him in the Oracle". The printed letters are appended to a copy of Este's My Own Life at the British Museum.

== Retirement ==
After five years, Topham disposed of his paper, abandoned Mary Wells for someone else, and retired with his three surviving daughters to Wold Cottage, about two miles from Thwing, East Riding of Yorkshire. It was rumoured that he intended to spend the rest of his days in farming some hundreds of acres of land and in writing the history of his own life. His kennels were considered the best in England, and his greyhound "Snowball" was praised as "one of the best and fleetest greyhounds that ever ran", and "his breed all most excellent". In 1801, he was offering a reward of Five Guineas on conviction of those poaching hares.

=== The meteorite ===
While Topham was living at Wold Cottage, a meteoric stone fell at around three o'clock on the afternoon of Sunday, 13 December 1795, within two fields of his house. In a letter dated 8 February 1796 and published in the press he states it fell on Sunday 20 December and immediately on being dug up, warm and smoking, weighed 3 stone 13 pounds, it had buried itself through 12 inches of soil and in six inches of solid chalk rock. Part of it was exhibited at the museum of James Sowerby, London, and is now in the Natural History Museum, London. Topham published An Account of it in 1798, and in 1799 erected a column on the spot. The stone was "in breadth 28 inches, in length 36 inches, and its weight was 56 pounds"

The Life of John Elwes, Esq., M.P. For Berkshire, by Edward Topham, Esq. late Captain in the Horse Guards (11th Ed), was published in 1815. Topham died in Doncaster on 26 April 1820, aged 68. He was for many years an acting magistrate for the North and East Ridings. He had three daughters, who were reckoned "the best horsewomen in Yorkshire".
