= Octon, East Riding of Yorkshire =

Hamlet in the East Riding of Yorkshire, England

Coordinates: 54.114324°N 0.420153°W

Octon
- Location within the East Riding of Yorkshire
- OS grid reference: TA033698
  - London: 180 mi (290 km) S
- Civil parish: Thwing
- Unitary authority: East Riding of Yorkshire
- Ceremonial county: East Riding of Yorkshire
- Region: Yorkshire and the Humber
- Country: England
- Sovereign state: United Kingdom
- Post town: DRIFFIELD
- Postcode district: YO25
- Dialling code: 01262
- Police: Humberside
- Fire: Humberside
- Ambulance: Yorkshire
- UK Parliament: Bridlington and The Wolds

Octon is a hamlet and shrunken medieval village in the East Riding of Yorkshire, England.

== History ==
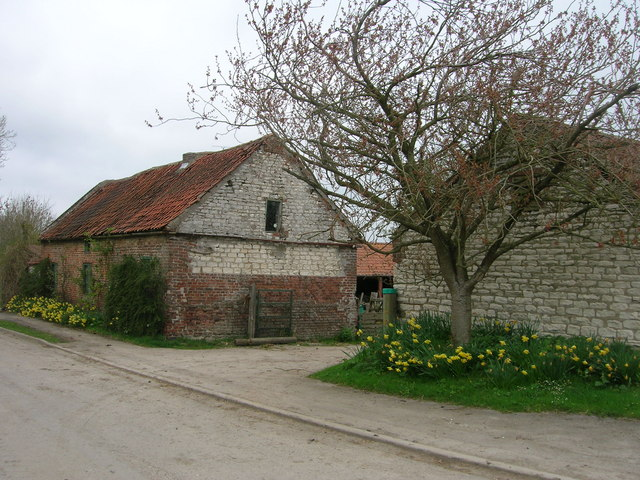
Farm buildings, Octon

Octon is recorded in the 11th-century Domesday Book as "Ocheton". The village contained a chapel dedicated to St. Michael (noted in 1327). After around 1400 no records exist relating to the chapel, and the village is thought likely to have been depopulated as a result of the Black Death.

By the 19th century the village was reduced to a small farming hamlet. In 1823 three farmers and a gamekeeper were recorded as resident in Octon, with a further two farmers at Octon Grange just over 1 mile (1.6 km) to the north. The extent of the hamlet remained unexpanded throughout the 19th and 20th centuries.

The modern village is at the same location as the reduced medieval village; earthworks of the medieval church and village were scheduled as an ancient monument in 1994. The 'Old farmhouse' at Glebe farm, Octon, a cruck framed longhouse dating from the 17th century is a Grade II* listed building.

== Geography ==
Octon is located approximately 1.25 miles (2 km) west of Thwing in the civil parish of Thwing. It is situated in the Yorkshire Wolds at a height of over 330 feet (100 m) above sea level approximately 9.5 miles (15 km) west of Bridlington on the North Sea coast. The village includes a large house 'Octon Manor'.

== Notable people ==
- Thomas Lamplugh, archbishop, was born in Octon in 1614.

== See also ==
- Listed buildings in Thwing, East Riding of Yorkshire
