= WNCC =

WNCC may refer to:

- WNCC (FM), a radio station (104.1 FM) licensed to Franklin, North Carolina, United States
- WNCC (AM), a defunct radio station (950 AM) formerly licensed to Barnesboro, Pennsylvania, United States
- Wold Newton Cricket Club, an English cricket club
- Western Nebraska Community College, a community college in Scottsbluff, Nebraska
