= Greystoke =

Greystoke may refer to:

- Greystoke, Cumbria, a village and civil parish in Cumbria, England
  - Greystoke Castle in this village
- Greystoke Park, an area of Newcastle upon Tyne, England
- Greystoke Park, a modern housing development in Penrith, England
- Baron Greystoke or Greystock, an English noble title, now extinct
- Tarzan, a fictional character whose English name was said to be John Clayton, Lord Greystoke
  - Greystoke: The Legend of Tarzan, Lord of the Apes, a 1984 film
  - Tarzan Alive: A Definitive Biography of Lord Greystoke (1972), a "fictional biography" by Philip José Farmer, based on Tarzan
