= Wold Cottage meteorite =

Meteorite that fell in Wold Newton in 1795

Wold Cottage
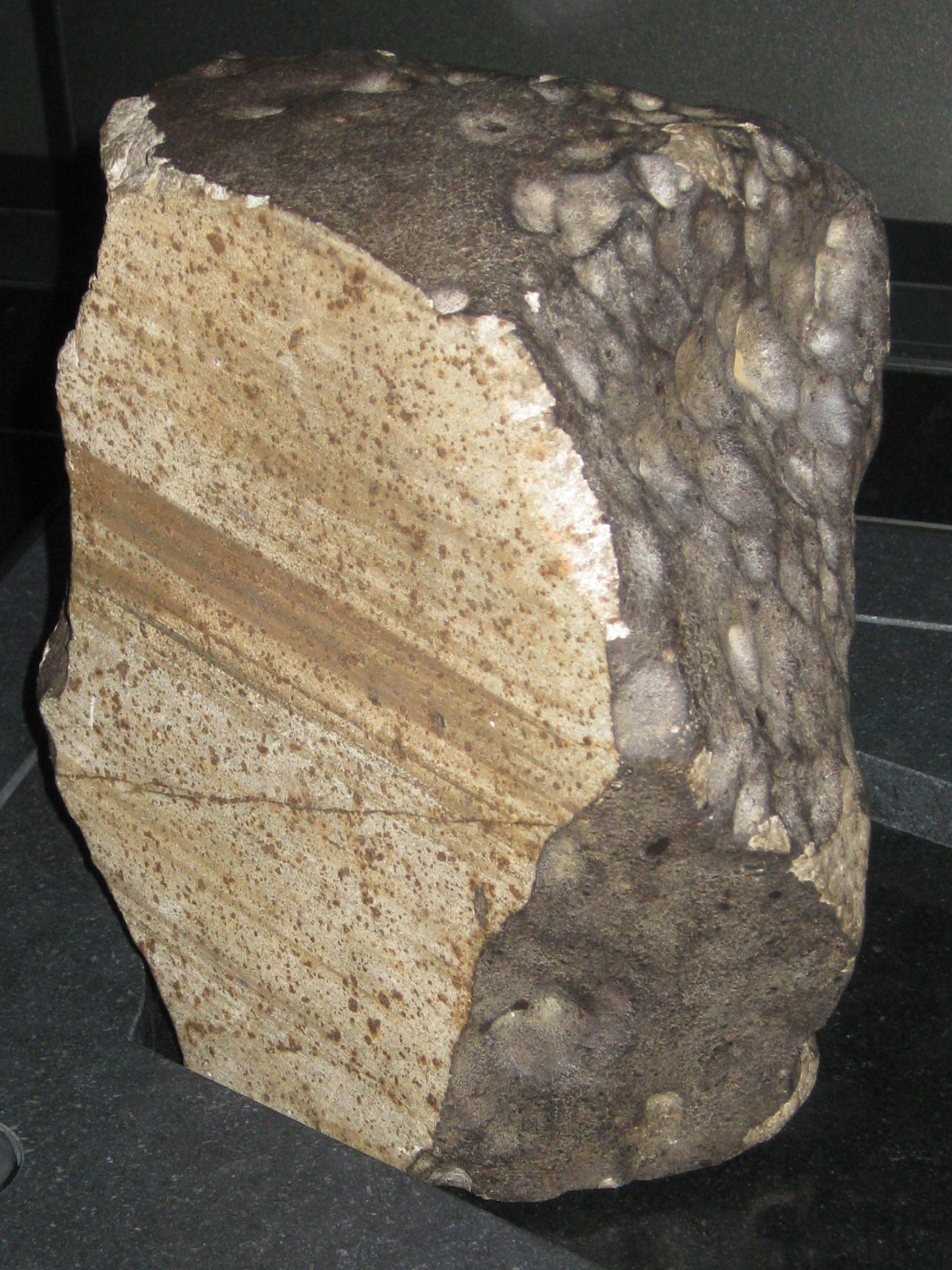
- On display in the Natural History Museum, London
- Type: Chondrite
- Class: Ordinary chondrite
- Group: L6
- Country: United Kingdom
- Region: Yorkshire, England
- Coordinates: 54°8′02.4″N 0°24′45.3″W
- Observed fall: Yes
- Fall date: 13 December 1795, 3 p.m.
- TKW: 56 lb (25 kg)
- Related media on Wikimedia Commons

The Wold Cottage meteorite (also called the Wold Newton meteorite) fell near Wold Cottage farm in 1795, a few miles away from the village of Wold Newton in Yorkshire, England.

== The meteorite ==
The stone fell at around 3 o'clock, on 13 December 1795, landing within a few yards of ploughman John Shipley. It created a crater approximately 1 yard (0.91 m) across, and embedded itself in the underlying chalk rock to a depth of 7 inches (180 mm), passing through 12 inches (300 mm) of topsoil. The fall was observed by several people, who described a dark body passing through the air. As discovered at its landing point, the stone was warm and smoking; several people reported sounds of explosions as it fell. The owner of the land was Major Edward Topham, a well-known public figure, an ex-soldier, playwright and newspaper proprietor; he publicised the find and exhibited the meteorite publicly at Piccadilly in London.

The stone initially weighed 56 pounds (25 kg). James Sowerby, a naturalist, acquired the meteorite in 1804. The meteorite was later acquired by the British Museum in 1835.

The meteorite can nowadays be seen in the Natural History Museum in London.

=== Analysis and research ===
Early analyses recorded two parts of the stone, an earthy part, and a malleable part. The earthy part analysed as containing silicon, magnesium, iron, and a small amount of nickel, of which some parts of the iron and nickel were in the elemental state; the earthy substance was similar to kaolin (weathered feldspar), but relatively tough. The malleable parts also contained iron and nickel, the majority iron. A form of iron pyrites (iron sulphur compound) was also reported present. Modern science records the meteorite as a L6 ordinary chondrite.

The Wold Cottage meteorite was the largest meteorite observed to fall in Britain, and is the second-largest recorded in Europe (after the Ensisheim meteorite that fell in 1492). The meteorite and evidence given about its fall contributed to the debate concerning whether extraterrestrial matter existed on Earth or not, and towards the early scientific study of meteorites.

=== The monument ===
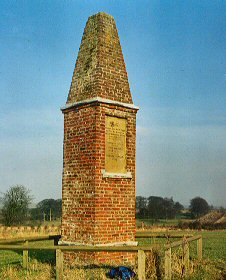
The Wold Newton meteorite monument

Inscription
Here
On this Spot, Dec^{r}. 13^{th}, 1795
Fell from the Atmoſphere
AN EXTRAORDINARY STONE
In Breadth 28 inches
In Length 36 inches
and
Whoſe Weight was 56 pounds.
----
THIS COLUMN
In Memory of it
Was erected by
EDWARD TOPHAM
1799

A monument was erected on the location of the stone's impact, by Major Topham, on whose property the stone had fallen. The structure was built of brick 4 ft (1.2 m) square and 25 ft (7.6 m) high, with a plaque on one face.

== In fiction ==
The event was used by the science fiction writer Philip José Farmer in his "biographies" of fictional characters (Tarzan Alive and Doc Savage: His Apocalyptic Life) as the basis for a literary premise commonly referred to as the Wold Newton family. The film Robinson in Ruins would also refer to the event, with the main character, Robinson, seeing it showing meteorites always fall at the time of significant events, in this case the 1795 amendment to the Settlement Act which allowed capitalism to develop faster in England.

The meteorite plays quite a central role in the 2019 detective novel Sherlock Holmes & The Christmas Demon by British author James Lovegrove.

== See also ==
- Glossary of meteoritics

== Notes ==
=== Literature ===
- Pillinger, C. T.; Pillinger, J. M. (January 1996), "The Value of Publicity—The Wold Cottage Chondrite, Edward Topham, and the Foundation of Meteoritics", Meteoritics & Planetary Science, 31: A108, Bibcode:1996M&PSA..31Q.108P, doi:10.1111/j.1945-5100.1996.tb02098.x
- Pillinger, C. T.; Pillinger, J. M. (August 1996a), "The Wold Cottage meteorite: Not just any ordinary chondrite", Meteoritics, 31 (5): 589–605, Bibcode:1996M&PS...31..589P, doi:10.1111/j.1945-5100.1996.tb02032.x
- Pillinger, C. T.; Pillinger, J. M. (July 1998), "Wold Cottage and Its Influence on Reports of the Pettiswood and Evora Meteorites" (PDF), Meteoritics & Planetary Science, 33: A123, Bibcode:1998M&PSA..33Q.123P, doi:10.1111/j.1945-5100.1998.tb01327.x
- Sowerby, James (1806), "Tab. CI. FERRUM nativum. Meteroic Iron", British mineralogy, or, Coloured figures intended to elucidate the mineralogy of Great Britain, vol. 2, pp. 1–19
