= Avenger (pulp-magazine character) =

Fictional pulp-magazine character

The Avenger
- The Avenger – Justice Inc. (Sep. 1939); Art by H. W. Scott.

Publication information
- Publisher: Street & Smith (1939–1943)
- First appearance: The Avenger #1 (Sept., 1939)
- Created by: Paul Ernst as "Kenneth Robeson"

In-story information
- Alter ego: Richard Henry Benson
- Supporting character of: Fergus "Mac" MacMurdie; Algernon Heathcote "Smitty" Smith; Nellie Gray; Josh and Rosabel Newton; Cole Wilson

The Avenger is a fictional character whose original adventures appeared between September 1939 and September 1942 in the pulp magazine The Avenger, published by Street & Smith, which ran 24 issues. Five additional short stories were published in Clues Detective magazine (1942–1943), and a sixth novelette in The Shadow magazine in 1943. Decades later, newly written pastiches were commissioned and published by Warner Brothers' Paperback Library from 1973 to 1974.

The Avenger was a pulp hero who combined elements of Doc Savage and The Shadow. The authorship of the pulp series was credited by Street & Smith to Kenneth Robeson, the same byline that appeared on the Doc Savage stories. Most of the original Avenger stories were actually written by Paul Ernst. The "Kenneth Robeson" name was a house pseudonym used by a number of different Street & Smith writers.

== History ==
In the late 1930s following in the wake of a slew of magazine cancellations (The Skipper, Bill Barnes and The Whisperer "had failed to capture the audience loyalty" of Doc Savage and the Shadow), Street & Smith's circulation manager Henry William Ralston and editor John L. Nanovic set out to create a new hero combining elements of both. They obtained advice from Lester Dent and Walter B. Gibson in the creation of the Avenger, and hired writer Paul Ernst. Both Dent and Gibson met with Ernst to give him advice on his stories, Dent focused on characterization and Gibson on plotting. The character of the Avenger, described by pulp expert Don Hutchison as "clearly an effort to form a hybrid of the company's more successful creations", echoed his forebears in other ways also. Whereas Doc Savage was known as "The Man of Bronze", the Avenger was described as "The Man of Steel". The Avenger's "marksman's eyes" echoed the "burning eyes" of the Shadow, who continued to be referred to as "The Masked Avenger".

When creating The Avenger, Paul Ernst drew on elements from characters he had previously created; Seekay (a private detective with a disfigured face who wears a plastic mask); The Wraith (a crimefighter who used both a knife and a gun); Dick Bullitt (with his gray features); Old Stone Face (the G-Man with the emotionless visage); the Gray Marauder and Karlu the Mystic.

In 1939, readers of Street & Smith's Doc Savage pulp magazine "thrilled to a special announcement" that a new periodical — The Avenger — "was soon to be published", and would feature stories "written by none other than Kenneth Robeson, 'the familiar creator of Doc Savage'". Robeson was actually a Street & Smith house name used by Ernst and a number of other authors, including Lester Dent, the actual writer of Doc Savage. The first issue of The Avenger was cover-dated September 1939, and featured a cover story/"lead novel" entitled "Justice Inc." Interior art was produced by Paul Orban, well known to pulp fans for his "similar work on Doc Savage and The Shadow".

=== Pulp demise ===
Describing the stories as "well-plotted" with good characterization and "an unusual amount of attention paid to detail", Hutchison notes that as a derivative character, the Avenger was destined not to be as popular as his original rivals, which Hutchison gives as Doc Savage, The Spider, G-8, The Shadow, Operator #5 and the Phantom, while still arguing that the character "can perhaps be considered the last of the great pulp heroes". His stories ran initially in his own magazine for 24 issues, first monthly and then (beginning with #13) bi-monthly in four volumes. The entire series ran exactly three years, ceasing publication in September 1942. The character was kept alive in Clues Detective with five additional short stories written by Emile Tepperman, plus an additional tale by Emile Tepperman which was published as a backup feature in a 1944 issue of The Shadow.

In Don Hutchison's estimation, the Avenger was following in big footsteps, and hamstrung by appearing too late in the day. Following the "instant justice" of The Shadow, the global stage of Doc Savage and other pulp heroes, the Avenger was, by 1939, "simply an unnecessary commodity". "Second best[,] he had tried harder ... but the timing was all wrong." Ultimately, Hutchison concludes, "The world did not require another good ten-cent hero."

=== Revivals ===
Nevertheless, the character was revived in the 1970s by Warner Paperback Library, given a brief revival by DC Comics (in comic book form), and was the subject of new short stories in 2008 from Moonstone Books. (See below)

== Character biography ==
=== Origins ===
The Avenger's real name is Richard Henry Benson, a globe-trotting adventurer who "had made his millions by professional adventuring": discovering rubber in South America, leading "native armies in Java", making "aerial maps in the Congo", mining "amethysts in Australia and emeralds in Brazil" and finding gold in Alaska and diamonds in the Transvaal. Following the pulp archetype of a wealthy hero, despite an internal chronology making them (and Benson in particular) "children of the Great Depression", the Avenger's backstory gave him the funding to ultimately "support [his] crime-fighting appurtenances".

Deciding to settle down and raise a family in the first Avenger novel ("Justice, Inc."), Benson's plans for a peaceful life as a "world-renowned industrial engineer" are shattered when his wife (Alicia) and young daughter (Alice) are kidnapped and presumably killed (though their bodies are never found) by some criminals during an airplane journey from Buffalo to Canada. The shock of this loss has a bizarre effect on Benson. His face becomes paralyzed while both his skin and his hair turn white, his facial flesh becoming malleable, like modelling clay. His face was thereafter (for the first dozen stories) regularly described (as in "The Smiling Dogs") as

...dead, like something dug out of a cemetery. The muscles were paralyzed so that never, under any circumstances, could they move in an expression. This dead, weird face was as white as snow – as white, in a word, as you'd expect any dead flesh to be! In the glacial expanse of the face were set eyes so light-gray as to seem completely colorless.

As a result of this tragedy, Benson vows to avenge himself on the villains, and to fight for all those who have suffered at the hands of criminals.

Don Hutchison suggests that "Benson's extreme personal misfortune was probably the strongest motivation accorded any of the great pulp heroes," stemming as it did from the death of his family and his own "death in life". The stories, by veteran pulp/magazine writer Paul Ernst "were well-plotted mysteries with mild science-fictional extrapolations", albeit often appearing somewhat subdued when compared to rival publications such as The Spider and Operator #5. Benson was "the master of the last-minute escape", cool and intellectual, mentally "the equal of Doc Savage" but otherwise "an average-sized man". The plastic, malleable state of his otherwise immobile features allowed the character to physically reshape his face with his fingers into a likeness of any person, his features remaining in sculpted form "until they were carefully put back into place". This ability, coupled with hair dyes and colored contact lenses, earned him the sobriquet "The Man of a Thousand Faces".

=== New face ===
After twelve issues, Ernst was directed editorially to eliminate Benson's facial affliction in the hopes that this would bolster the dwindling audience for the magazine. Thus the second "distinct era" of the Avenger began with the first issue of the now-bi-monthly third volume (#13), just over a year after the magazine's debut.

The thirteenth issue, "Murder On Wheels", saw the introduction of the last major recurring character, Cole Wilson. Initially an opponent of the Avenger (before joining Justice, Inc. in the same issue), Wilson trapped the Avenger in a machine which "provided a nerve shock of a different sort", turning Benson's flesh back to normal and his hair black. Although the Avenger still disguised himself after this, he could no longer mold his now normal flesh. Three stories – "Nevlo" (#17), "House of Death" (#15) and "Death in Slow Motion" (#18) – had been written by Ernst prior to this radical shift in character, and underwent rewrites before seeing publication. Although the original texts would place these three stories chronologically earlier than #13, the rewrites serve to fit them into the timelines as published (although some slight original traces remain under the heavy-handed later insertions). Often dismissed as a late addition to the stories, Cole Wilson was to play a greater part in the last dozen pastiches written in the 1970s by Ron Goulart.

=== Gadgets ===
The Avenger far preferred tricking criminals into "destroy[ing] themselves in traps of their own devising" to killing them himself, allowing writer Ernst to create considerably elaborate plots.

Like Doc Savage, Benson relies on a variety of special gadgets to help him overcome criminals. These include knockout gas bombs, miniature two-way radios, a woven, transparent bullet-proof garment and "glass pellets containing a gas... [which] instantly [spread] a black impenetrable pall like instant night", also accessible through a stud on Benson's collar.

His car rivalled those of the later James Bond series, "being a rather dull 1935 model" capable of speeds up to 130 mph (unheard of at the time), "bullet-proofed throughout and equipped with devices and special little inventions for offence and defence", including automatic bullet-proofed windows and "miniature torpedoes of potent knock-out gas".

The Avenger also carried a pair of weapons "strapped in slim sheaths on [his] right and left calf" – his specially streamlined and silenced .22 revolver ("Mike") and a needle-pointed throwing knife ("Ike"). Using these customized tools, Benson could shoot someone so that his bullet just touched their heads and knocked them out, or "hit a fly-speck from twenty feet".

=== Assistants ===
Like Doc Savage before him, Benson rarely underwent his adventures alone, gathering a number of assistants to help him. His small band, known as "Justice, Inc.", was made up of people who had all been "irreparably damaged by crime", and who have specialized skills:

- Fergus "Mac" MacMurdie ("Justice, Inc.") is a stereotypically dour Scotsman who is also a gifted pharmacist and chemist. His family was killed by racketeers, leaving Mac embittered, vengeful and "indifferent to the threat of... death".
- Algernon Heathcote "Smitty" Smith ("Justice, Inc.") is a gigantic man (6' 9") of incredible strength. Smitty looks slow and stupid, but he is actually a genius with electronics. He was framed – and spent a year in jail – for a crime he did not commit, and initially attacked Benson, believing the Avenger was out to arrest him.
- Nellie Gray ("The Yellow Hoard"), "the Emma Peel of her day", is a beautiful, delicate-looking young woman who is actually an expert at jujutsu and other martial arts. Her archaeologist father was killed by criminals for the buried Aztec gold he had found. After his murder was solved by Benson's Justice Inc., the treasure "became the equivalent of Doc Savage's hoard of inexhaustible Mayan gold".
- Josh and Rosabel Newton ("The Sky Walker") are an African American couple whose employers were killed by criminals. They often go undercover as domestic servants, making use of the stereotypes of the time to hide their investigative abilities, in "an ironic comment on the image. .. in the films and fiction of the day". Both are graduates of the Tuskegee Institute (now University), and the couple have children later in the series. (The Avenger is notable for its presentation of minorities. While many of the pulp magazines of the time are well known for racist stereotypes, both Josh and Rosabel are always presented as brave, intelligent people of good character.)
- Cole Wilson joins the group near the middle of the series. He is much less distinctive than Benson's other assistants and has a light-hearted manner that contrasts the Avenger's serious tone, described as having "a streak of Robin Hood in him".

== Avenger novels and short stories ==
=== The Avenger (1939–1942) ===
Novels written by Paul Ernst and published in The Avenger magazine. The first thirteen stories are believed to have been published in the order in which they were written. After the considerable changes introduced in Murder on Wheels (Nov. 1940), three already-finished stories were reworked by Street & Smith's editors to match them to the new format. Since they were reworked, the stories nevertheless follow internal chronology as well as publication order.

The first two volumes appeared monthly (with the exception of the twelfth issue), and featured covers by Harold Winfield Scott ("H.W. Scott"). Volumes III and IV (#'s 13 through 24) were covered in artwork by "Graves Gladney, Lenosci and Leslie Ross".

- Volume I
  - 1. Justice, Inc., published September 1, 1939
  - 2. The Yellow Hoard, published October 1, 1939
  - 3. The Sky Walker, published November 1, 1939
  - 4. The Devil's Horns, published December 1, 1939
  - 5. The Frosted Death, published January 1, 1940
  - 6. The Blood Ring, published February 1, 1940
- Volume II
  - 7. Stockholders in Death, published March 1, 1940
  - 8. The Glass Mountain, published April 1, 1940
  - 9. Tuned for Murder, published May 1, 1940
  - 10. The Smiling Dogs, published June 1, 1940
  - 11. River of Ice, published July 1, 1940
  - 12. The Flame Breathers, published September 1, 1940
- Volume III
  - 13. Murder on Wheels, published November 1, 1940
  - 14. Three Gold Crowns, published January 1, 1941
  - 15. House of Death, published March 1, 1941
  - 16. The Hate Master, published May 15, 1941
  - 17. Nevlo, published July 1, 1941.
  - 18. Death in Slow Motion, published September 1, 1941
- Volume IV
  - 19. Pictures of Death, published November 1, 1941
  - 20. The Green Killer, published January 1, 1942
  - 21. The Happy Killers, published March 1, 1942
  - 22. The Black Death, published May 1, 1942
  - 23. The Wilder Curse, published July 1, 1942
  - 24. Midnight Murder, published September 1, 1942

=== Clues Detective (1942–1943) ===
Short stories later written by Emile C. Tepperman and published in Clues Detective magazine. Internal dates and references have led some pulp experts to adjust the numbering a bit on Tepperman's short stories. These stories by Tepperman were not reprinted in the 1970s, probably due to their brevity.

  - 25. Death to the Avenger, published September 1, 1942
  - 26. A Coffin for the Avenger, published November 1, 1942
  - 27. Vengeance on the Avenger, published January 1, 1943
  - 28. Calling Justice, Inc.!, published March 1, 1943
  - 29. Cargo of Doom, published May 1, 1943

=== The Shadow (1944) ===
Short Avenger story written by Emile C. Tepperman and published in The Shadow magazine, 1944.

  - 30. To Find a Dead Man, published August 1, 1944

=== Warner Paperback Library (1972–1975) ===
Following the original 24 pulp novels by Paul Ernst, and the half-dozen short stories written by Emile C. Tepperman (also under the "Kenneth Robeson" pseudonym) in the 1940s, Warner Paperback Library (30 years later) reprinted the original twenty-four Avenger novels in a paperback book format similar to Bantam Books' successful Doc Savage reprint library.

Continuing on after #24, Warner commissioned ghost writer Ron Goulart to write 12 brand new pastiche novels to extend the paperback reprint series to #36, ignoring Tepperman's six short stories from the 1940s in favor of brand new book-length tales. The covers for the 1970s Avenger paperback series were initially painted by Peter Caras, and later by George Gross. These fit chronologically after the six Tepperman stories, but were numbered by Warner from #25 through #36 (since Warner skipped over the Tepperman stories). Steve Holland (actor) was the model for Benson on the cover art, as he was for Doc Savage in Bantam's paperback reprints of that series.

Note: Numbers in parentheses denote Warner Paperback Library's designation.

  - 31. (25) The Man from Atlantis, published June 1, 1974
  - 32. (26) Red Moon, published July 1, 1974
  - 33. (27) The Purple Zombie, published August 1, 1974
  - 34. (28) Dr. Time, published September 1, 1974
  - 35. (29) The Nightwitch Devil, published October 1, 1974
  - 36. (30) Black Chariots, published November 1, 1974
  - 37. (31) The Cartoon Crimes, published December 1, 1974
  - 38. (32) The Death Machine, published January 1, 1975
  - 39. (33) The Blood Countess, published February 1, 1975
  - 40. (34) The Glass Man, published March 1, 1975
  - 41. (35) The Iron Skull, published April 1, 1975
  - 42. (36) Demon Island, published May 1, 1975

=== Moonstone Books (2008– ) ===
Beginning in the early 2000s, Moonstone Books (under editor/publisher Joe Gentile) have produced a number of prose and comic books based on licensed pulp, detective and other characters, beginning with the Phantom. In 2008, a prose anthology (available in paperback and limited edition hardback) was released containing new stories featuring the Avenger, with covers by Dave Dorman, 1970s paperback cover artist Peter Caras, and a Limited Edition cover by Douglas Klauba. The anthology was edited by Joe Gentile and Howard Hopkins, and featured numerous stories by authors including Gentile, Hopkins, Ron Goulart, Will Murray, Win Scott Eckert, Richard Dean Starr, Tom DeFalco, Paul Kupperberg, Mel Odom, and others.

Moonstone has also announced plans to continue the novel series. To date, they have released one new title.

- 43. The Sun King by Matthew Baugh, published July 7, 2015
- 44. Double Feature by Bobby Nash and Chuck Miller, published November 14, 2018
- 45. Hunt the Avenger by Win Scott Eckert, July 2019
- nn. The Avenger Chronicles, published October 2008
- nn. The Avenger: The Justice, Inc. Files, published 2011 (This special edition hardback contained additional solo stories of the Avenger's aides Mac, Nellie and Cole.)
- nn. The Avenger: Roaring Heart of the Crucible, published 2013 (This special edition hardback contained additional solo stories of the Avenger's aides Josh, Rosabel and Smitty.)

== Non-pulp ==
=== Reprints ===
In 2009, Sanctum Productions began reprinting only the 24 original pulp novels in near-replica editions. Each issue reprinted two novels and contains the original black-and-white interior illustrations from the pulps as well as the original pulp magazine covers on front and back. This is similar to their current reprint series of Doc Savage and The Shadow.

=== Continuations, extrapolations ===
The Avenger is mentioned by author Philip José Farmer as a part of his Wold Newton family, and in an essay published in Myths for the Modern Age: Philip José Farmer's Wold Newton Universe (MonkeyBrain Books, 2005), Chuck Loridans contributes an article entitled "The Daughters of Greystoke" wherein he constructs a family tree linking Nellie Gray to Tarzan and Jane Porter.

In 2008, Moonstone Books produced the first The Avenger anthology, featuring stories written by a number of variant pulp fans and writers – including Ron Goulart and the Myths for the Modern Age editor Win Scott Eckert.

=== Comics ===
Justice Inc.
- Cover to Justice Inc. #1 (May 1975). Art by Joe Kubert.

Publication information
- Publisher: DC Comics
- Schedule: Bi-monthly
- Genre: Crime
- Publication date: May – November 1975

Creative team
- Written by: Dennis O'Neil
- Artist: Al McWilliams
- Penciller: Jack Kirby
- Inker: Mike Royer

Cover to issue #1 of DC Comics' 1989 Justice Inc. series. Art by Kyle Baker.

There have been several attempts to revive the Avenger as a comic book character, beginning in the 1940s in Street & Smith's own Shadow Comics, but none (to date) have proved particularly successful. The character first appeared in Shadow Comics #2 (Feb 1940), and made seven appearances until 1944.

In 1975, DC Comics published a comic called Justice, Inc. which starred the Avenger. This was during the time they were also publishing The Shadow. The Avenger also appeared in issue #11 of The Shadow. The first two issues were based on stories from the pulp magazine. Issues #2–4 were drawn by Jack Kirby (as were the covers to issues #2 and #3). The comic only lasted four issues.

In the 1980s, when DC Comics was again doing The Shadow, an "updated" version of the Avenger showed up briefly. In 1989, DC released a two-issue miniseries, in 52-page prestige format, written by Andy Helfer and pencilled and inked by Kyle Baker, titled Justice, Inc.. The miniseries revealed the 'truth' behind the Avenger's origin.

In November 2009 the Avenger showed up in the series The First Wave spun off from the Batman/Doc Savage Special. The Avenger had a backup series in the new Doc Savage (2010) comic, written by award-winning thriller novelist Jason Starr. However, several alterations were made to his aides and to Justice, Inc. The series ran in Doc Savage issues #1–9, plus he starred in the First Wave Special.

In August 2014, the Avenger appeared in a five-part miniseries published by Dynamite Entertainment, titled Justice, Inc., appearing together with The Shadow and Doc Savage. A one-shot issue of Justice, Inc. appeared in December, 2014 titled The Television Killers.

=== Radio ===
Similarly short-lived was "an Avenger radio serial carried by Station WHN in New York City and syndicated in other parts of the country". From July 18, 1941, to November 3, 1942, the pulp novel Avenger was on the air in a series based on the magazine.

(Script excerpt from The Avenger radio program, airdate: Tuesday, September 9, 1941 9:30–10:00 p.m.)

MUSIC: (ORGAN) AVENGER HUM WITH CODE

BENSON: Enemies of Justice...This is The Avenger!

MUSIC: UP WITH THEME, THEN SEGUE TO MOOD (KEEP IN BACKGROUND)

BENSON: You who operate beyond the Law... you who seek to wreck the peace of America... BEWARE! I shall crush your power, destroy the vultures who prey upon the innocent and the unsuspecting. I...AM...THE AVENGER!

MUSIC: UP WITH THEME, THEN SEGUE TO MOOD (KEEP IN BACKGROUND)

The Avenger radio show originated from Long Island, NY-based station WHN and was broadcast over a time-span of 62 weeks. It also seems to have aired on many stations across the United States as a transcription series. The 62 weeks refer only to the period during which the program aired, not the number of shows. There were apparently a number of preemptions, due to coverage of sporting events. Most likely, the series consisted of a then standard run of 26 half-hour episodes (plus repeats). Unfortunately, despite the fact that the program was recorded for syndication, the only remaining artifacts of the show are seven scripts.

All of these are from the first nine weeks of the show, one of which is an original script entitled Tear Drop Tank. The others are The Hate Master, River of Ice, Three Gold Crowns, The Blood Ring, The Devil's Horns, and The Avenger. All are based on the magazine novels of the same name, with the exception of The Avenger, which is based on the second adventure, The Yellow Hoard. None of the scripts mentions the production crew or cast—in fact, the first three surviving scripts do not even list the authors.

The final four remaining scripts (judging by the airdates listed) were all written by Maurice Joachim. Maurice Joachim was an actor and radio scriptwriter, who wrote episodes of the 1940s WMCA-produced Doc Savage series. It is quite likely he also acted on the Avenger, as he was reputed to be a highly versatile actor -– in the mid-1930s he hosted the Majestic Master of Mystery program, and played all the parts himself. Only Joachim and the organist were credited in the script, which had the announcer give the credit "with original music by Dick Ballou".

These directions specified a Morse Code motif for the music, which was echoed in the sound effects. In the scripts earliest scripts, the "Avenger Hum" is mentioned within the episodes, as in them the impression is given that Richard Benson has a radio unit surgically implanted inside him, and thus his entrances are heralded by a carrier wave tone. This somewhat unsettling idea is dropped at some point in the series, with the novels' compact belt radios used instead.

The surviving scripts do not include the African American characters, Josuah and Rosabel Newton, nor the young Cole Wilson.
