= The Devil's Horns =

Pulp magazine story

"The Devil's Horns" is the 4th pulp magazine story to feature The Avenger. Written by Paul Ernst, it was published in the December 1939 issue of The Avenger magazine.

== Publishing history ==
This novel was re-published under its original title by Paperback Library in September 1972.

== Summary ==
Oliver Groman, aging town boss of crime-ridden Ashton City, has a stroke and a change of heart. He asks Benson to clean out the racketeers, gangsters, and corrupt officials. Each member of Justice Inc. goes undercover, working on separate aspects of the investigation, facing separate dangers. A masked cabal, 4 evil men led by a mysterious 5th, runs the town and works against Justice Inc. They research Benson: "some wealthy sap who fancies himself an amateur crime fighter. Rich as hell." Groman has another incapacitating stroke. Moves and counter-moves: Benson is hounded by a corrupt policeman, Smitty is framed for a murder and is sprung by a disguised Benson, a carful of criminals goes over a cliff, Josh spies on a corrupt judge, Nellie and Rosabel are found out and must be rescued, etc. Benson acts as a detective, solving the puzzle of the Devil's Horns, and as a grim, frightening, no-nonsense crimefighter. A giant safe is found in Groman's house, filled with ill-gotten loot, sought by all. The masked 5 trap Justice Inc., only to have the deathtrap backfire and kill the 5 criminals.
