= Wold Newton family =

Fictional crossover literary device

The Wold Newton family is a literary concept derived from a form of crossover fiction developed by the American science fiction writer Philip José Farmer.

== Origins ==
In real life a meteorite, called the Wold Cottage meteorite, fell near Wold Newton, Yorkshire, England, on December 13, 1795.

Farmer suggested in two fictional biographies, Tarzan Alive: A Definitive Biography of Lord Greystoke (1972) and Doc Savage: His Apocalyptic Life (1973) that this meteorite caused genetic mutations in the occupants of two passing coaches due to ionization. Many of their descendants were thus endowed with extremely high intelligence and strength, as well as an exceptional capacity and drive to perform good or, as the case may be, evil deeds. The progeny of these travellers are purported to have been the real-life originals of fictionalised characters, both heroic and villainous, over the last few hundred years.

== Members ==
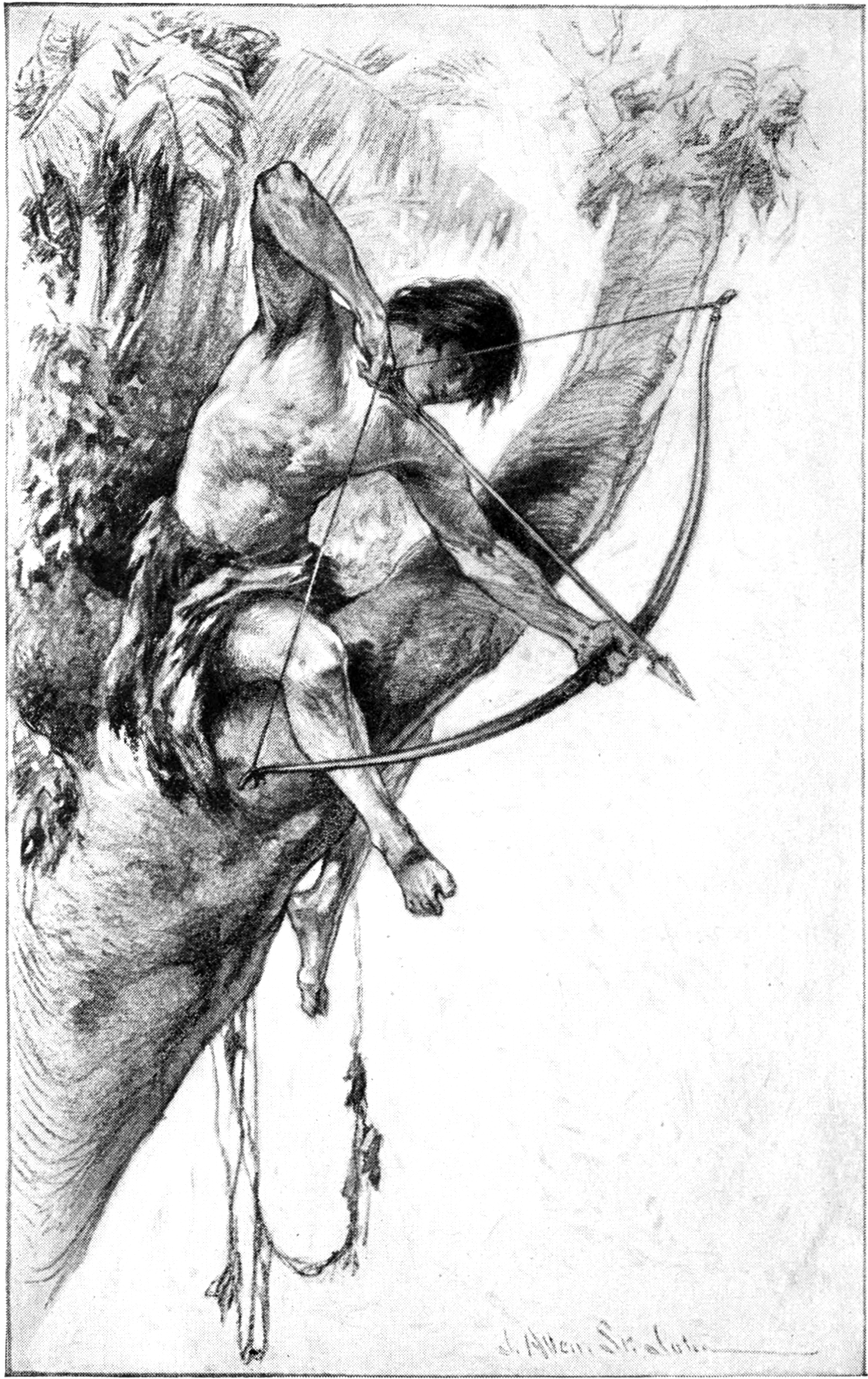
Tarzan

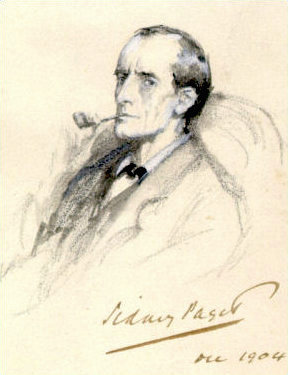
Sherlock Holmes

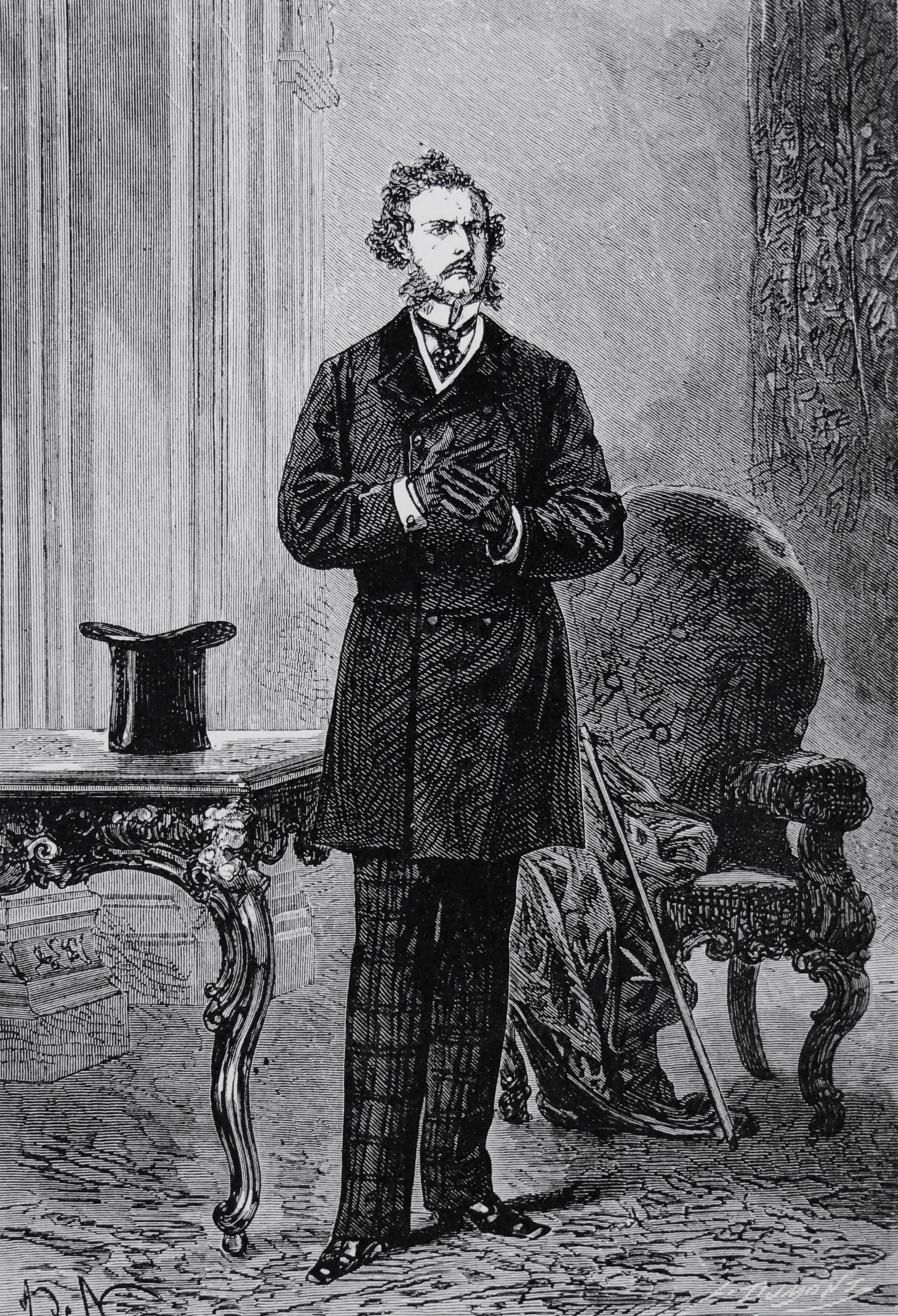
Phileas Fogg

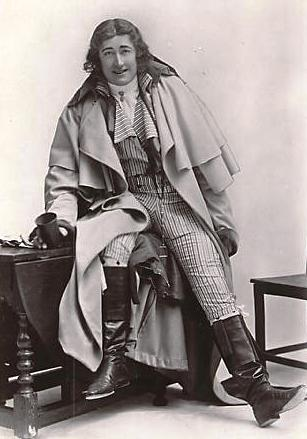
The Scarlet Pimpernel

Public domain depictions of some of the main characters used in Wold Newton family

As well as Tarzan and Doc Savage, both Lord Peter Wimsey and Sherlock Holmes are descendants of the original families. Other popular characters included by Farmer as members of the Wold Newton family are Solomon Kane; Captain Blood; The Scarlet Pimpernel; Sherlock Holmes's nemesis Professor Moriarty; Phileas Fogg; The Time Traveller (main character of The Time Machine by H. G. Wells); Allan Quatermain; A. J. Raffles; Professor Challenger; Richard Hannay; Bulldog Drummond; the evil Fu Manchu and his adversary, Sir Denis Nayland Smith; G-8; The Shadow; Sam Spade; Doc Savage's cousin Patricia Savage and one of his five assistants, Monk Mayfair; The Spider; Nero Wolfe; Mr. Moto; The Avenger; Philip Marlowe; James Bond; Lew Archer; Travis McGee; Monsieur Lecoq; and Arsène Lupin.

== Universe ==
The Wold Newton Universe (or WNU) is a term coined by Win Scott Eckert to denote an expansion of Philip José Farmer's original Wold Newton Family concept (introduced in Tarzan Alive [1972]). Eckert introduced the term in 1997 on his website, An Expansion of Philip José Farmer's Wold Newton Universe. Eckert and others use Farmer's concept of the Wold Newton Family as a unifying device and to expand the universe that the Wold Newton Family inhabits by including essays in the vein of the Sherlockian "Game", in which theories are proposed and supported by supplying contextual background information and persuasive argument; by writing fiction authorized by Farmer and Farmer's Estate which adds elements and characters to the Wold Newton Family and/or the WNU; by writing other fiction which contains "Easter egg" references to the Wold Newton Family or the WNU, or which otherwise expands the overall mythos; and by documenting crossovers between fictional characters from various media and genres.

Characters incorporated into the WNU are not necessarily blood relatives, descendants, or ancestors of the coach travelers present at the 1795 Wold Cottage meteor strike, but these characters all exist in the same shared fictional universe. Farmer himself penned a number of stories and novels set in what is now termed the Wold Newton Universe; not all characters in Farmer's Wold Newton fiction are core members of the Wold Newton Family, but all are linked into the larger WNU via connections with Farmer's primary Wold Newton Family works, Tarzan Alive and Doc Savage: His Apocalyptic Life.

=== Depowering superheroes ===
Among the membership of the WNU are comic book superheroes and supervillains whose published exploits, by their very nature, often prove difficult to reconcile with Farmer's original framework. WNU's root conceit has always been that characters known by the reader as fictional actually lived or are yet living, with their adventures based on true events embroidered by the genre authors who serve as their "biographers". Therefore, in order for aspects of larger fictional universes to adhere to WNU's overall continuity and believability, certain accounts of these new characters' lives have been labeled as a distortion of actual events or dismissed as complete fabrication.

=== Additional genres ===
Eckert and other post-Farmerian authors—admirers of Farmer's Wold Newton biographies and fiction who write in Eckert's vein—have published numerous further fictional characters in many literary styles and media, including works emulating the aesthetics of the Renaissance, Romantic and Victorian eras; such subgenres of prose fiction as Gothic and steampunk; the fairy tale, mythology and folklore categories of traditional stories; publication formats like the graphic novel, the comic book, the pulp magazine and the penny dreadful; and the non-print media of motion pictures, television shows, radio programs and video games.

=== References ===
The expanded WNU is documented in articles by WNU experts on the various WNU-themed websites; in Myths for the Modern Age: Philip José Farmer's Wold Newton Universe (edited by Win Scott Eckert, MonkeyBrain Books, 2005, a 2007 Locus Award finalist); in various issues of Farmerphile: The Magazine of Philip José Farmer, the prozine dedicated to and authorized by Farmer and published by Michael Croteau, webmaster of the official Philip José Farmer home page ; and in various stories, novellas, and novels authorized by Farmer or by Farmer's Estate, such as Tales of the Wold Newton Universe (edited by Win Scott Eckert and Christopher Paul Carey, Titan Books, 2013) and various books published by Meteor House.

Going beyond the WNU is Eckert's Crossover Universe, published in book form by Black Coat Press in two volumes in 2010 as Crossovers: A Secret Chronology of the World, in which a massive continuity is created in a "six degrees" game of linked crossover stories. Eckert's Crossover Universe work is being carried forward by Sean Levin. The important distinction between a Wold Newton story and a crossover story is discussed at length by Eckert and Carey in their introduction to Tales of the Wold Newton Universe.

=== List of works ===
- Tarzan Alive: A Definitive Biography of Lord Greystoke (1972)
- Doc Savage: His Apocalyptic Life (1973)
- The Other Log of Phileas Fogg (1973)
- Time's Last Gift (1972)
- Hadon of Ancient Opar (1974)
- The Adventure of the Peerless Peer (1974)
- Flight to Opar (1976)
- Myths for the Modern Age: Philip José Farmer's Wold Newton Universe (edited by Win Scott Eckert, 2005)
- Crossovers: A Secret Chronology of the World Parts 1 and 2 (2010)
- Tales of the Wold Newton Universe (edited by Win Scott Eckert and Christopher Paul Carey, 2013)
- Farmerphile: The Magazine of Philip José Farmer

== Similar creations ==
An earlier proponent of this sort of fiction was William S. Baring-Gould, who wrote a fictional biography of Sherlock Holmes entitled Sherlock Holmes of Baker Street.

In 1977 C. W. Scott-Giles, an expert in heraldry who served as Fitzalan Pursuivant of Arms Extraordinary, published a history of Lord Peter Wimsey's family, going back to 1066 (but describing the loss of the family tree going back to Adam and Eve); the book is based on material from Scott-Giles's correspondence with Dorothy L. Sayers, who wrote at least two of the family anecdotes in the book, one of them in mediaeval French.

Warren Ellis's comic book series Planetary has a similar premise of fitting many different superhero, science fiction, and fantasy elements into the same universe. For the most part, constrained by the needs of the story and copyright, Ellis does not use the originals but rather his own re-interpretations of the archetypes.

Author Kim Newman has stated that his Anno Dracula series was partially inspired by the Wold Newton family.

The anthology series Tales of the Shadowmen edited by Jean-Marc Lofficier is also based on the Wold Newton concept and includes characters from French literature.

Alan Moore did likewise in his The League of Extraordinary Gentlemen comic book (and its sequels). In this series, various Victorian-era literary characters meet and join the eponymous League; however, they are not descended from a single family. Over the course of the series, the world of the League incorporates many works of fiction from many different eras – not just Victorian literature – into its universe. Moore calls the Wold Newton stories "a seminal influence upon the League".
