= Tuned for Murder =

Novel by Paul Ernst

First publication

Tuned for Murder is the 9th pulp magazine story to feature The Avenger. Written by Paul Ernst, it was published in the May 1940 issue of The Avenger magazine.

== Publishing history ==
This novel was re-published under its original title by Paperback Library on February 1, 1973.

== Summary ==
Strange happenings in Garfield City, NY: a banker hands out money and insults; a respected scientist laughs and dances; nearby, dogs howl; a scientist, Cranlowe, has invented a weapon to stop war; other cases of insanity occur; a well-organized gang kidnaps and murders, trying to get Cranlowe’s super-weapon. The gang seemingly kills the Justice, Inc. team; Benson, Mac, Josh, and Smitty use the opportunity to go undercover. Josh, posing as a shoeshine boy at Garfield Gear, is found out and nearly killed. Nellie befriends Cranlowe's wife, is kidnapped, and takes on four men in a fight. Under terrible threats, Cranlowe won't reveal the weapon's formula. Jenner, president of Garfield Gear, controls the minds of others, but is controlled himself. The mind control device, an invention abandoned by Cranlowe, uses high-frequency vibrations unique to each individual. Benson's mind is apparently controlled; later, he fights a mind-controlled Smitty, who has easily overcome Josh, Mac and Nellie. Benson early on knows who the mastermind is, but Doc-Savage-like allows things to play out without informing his aides. The partly hypnotized mastermind shoots himself, and the super-weapon is finally turned over to the US government.
