= Up from the Bottomless Pit and Other Stories =

2007 collection of literary works by Philip José Farmer

- Cover of first edition (hardcover)
- Editor: Christopher Paul Carey
- Author: Philip Jose Farmer
- Illustrator: Jason Robert Bell Charles Berlin Keith Howell Karl Kauffman Shannon Robicheaux
- Cover artist: Charles Berlin & Keith Howell
- Language: English
- Genre: Science fiction
- Publisher: Subterranean Press
- Publication date: 2007
- Publication place: United States
- Media type: Print (hardcover)
- Pages: 373 pp
- ISBN: 978-1-59606-128-6
- OCLC: 180152497

Up from the Bottomless Pit and Other Stories (ISBN 978-1-59606-128-6) is an original collection featuring a short novel and other short fiction by American science fiction author Philip José Farmer (1918-2009). It was edited by Christopher Paul Carey and published in 2007. All of the works in the book written by Farmer previously appeared in the periodical Farmerphile: The Magazine of Philip José Farmer between 2005 and 2007. It includes several mainstream stories by Farmer, who is better known for his science fiction work.

== Contents ==
- "Introduction: Philip José Farmer: On the Road to the Emerald City" by Christopher Paul Carey
- Up from the Bottomless Pit (novel)
- "That Great Spanish Author, Ernesto"
- "The Essence of the Poison"
- "Keep Your Mouth Shut"
- "The Face That Launched a Thousand Eggs"
- "The Doll Game"
- "The Rebels Unthawed"
- "The Frames"
- "The Light-Hog Incident"
- "The Unnaturals"
- "A Spy in the U.S. of Gonococcia"
- "A Peoria Night"
- "I Still Live!"
- "Hayy ibn Yaqzam by Abu ibn Tufayl: An Arabic Mowgli"
- "Why Do I Write?"

== Sources ==
- Carey, Christopher Paul. (2007) "Introduction: Philip José Farmer: On the Road to the Emerald City" in Up from the Bottomless Pit and Other Stories by Philip José Farmer, Burton, MI: Subterranean Press. ISBN 978-1-59606-128-6
