= John Twenge =

English Roman Catholic saint

John Twenge (Saint John of Bridlington)
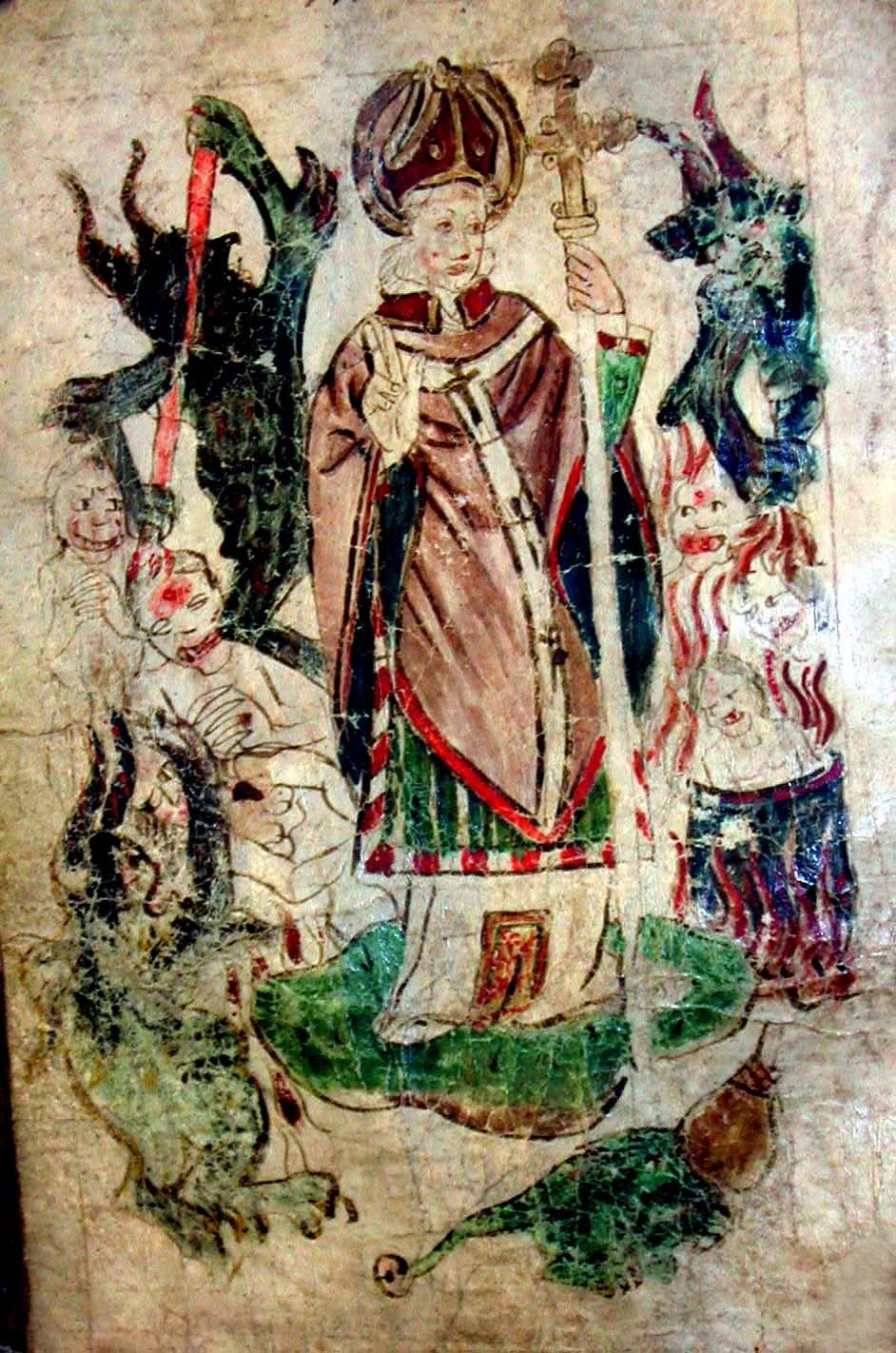
- John of Bridlington in a 15th-century manuscript illustration
- Born: 1320; Thwing, England
- Died: 10 October 1379
- Venerated in: Roman Catholic Church
- Canonized: 24 September 1401 by Pope Boniface IX
- Feast: 21 October
- Attributes: fish, book, crozier, fur almice; muzzled animal at his feet
- Patronage: women in difficult labour; fishermen

John Twenge (Saint John of Bridlington, John Thwing, John of Thwing, John Thwing of Bridlington) (1320–1379) is an English saint of the 14th century. In his lifetime he enjoyed a reputation for great holiness and for miraculous powers. St John of Bridlington was commended for the integrity of his life, his scholarship, and his quiet generosity. He was the last English saint to be canonised before the English Reformation.

== Life ==
Born in 1320 in the village of Thwing on the Yorkshire Wolds, about nine miles west of Bridlington, he was of the Yorkshire family Twenge, which during the English Reformation would supply two Roman Catholic priest-martyrs, and was also instrumental in establishing the Institute of the Blessed Virgin Mary at Bar Convent, York.

John Twenge was educated at a school in the village from the age of five, completing his studies at Oxford University. He then entered the Augustinian Canons Regular community of Bridlington Priory. He carried out his duties with humility and diligence, and was in turn novice master, almsgiver, preacher and sub-prior. He became Canon of the Priory in 1346 and was eventually elected Prior in 1356. John initially declined out of humility, but after being re-elected, probably in 1361, he took on the duties of Prior in January 1362. He served as Prior for 17 years before his death on 10 October 1379.

== Miracles attributed to him ==
In his lifetime he enjoyed a reputation for great holiness and for miraculous powers. Reputedly on one occasion he changed water into wine. On another, five seamen from Hartlepool in danger of shipwreck called upon God in the name of His servant, John of Bridlington, whereupon the prior himself appeared to them in his canonical habit and brought them safely to shore. The men left their vessel at the harbour and walked to the Monastery where they thanked John in person for saving their lives.

The Vision of William Staunton (British Library Manuscripts, Royal 17.B.xliii and Additional 34,193) recounts William's visit to St Patrick's Purgatory where he sees both purgatory and the earthly paradise and is conducted through the otherworld by St John of Bridlington and St Ive (of Quitike).

== Death and canonisation ==
After his death from natural causes, the fame of the supposed miracles brought by his intercession spread rapidly through the land. Alexander Neville, Archbishop of York, charged his suffragans and others to take evidence with a view to his canonisation, 26 July 1386. Richard le Scrope, Archbishop of York 1398–1405, assisted by the bishops of Durham and Carlisle, officiated at a solemn translation of his body, 11 March 1404, de mandato Domini Papae. This pope, Boniface IX, shortly afterwards canonised him. The canonisation had been doubted and disputed; but the original Bull was unearthed in the Vatican archives by T. A. Twemlow, who was engaged in research work there for the British government.

At the English Reformation, Henry VIII was asked to spare the magnificent shrine of the saint, but it was destroyed in 1537. The nave of the church, restored in 1857, is all that now remains of Bridlington Priory. The saint's feast is observed by the canons regular on 9 October.

== Veneration ==
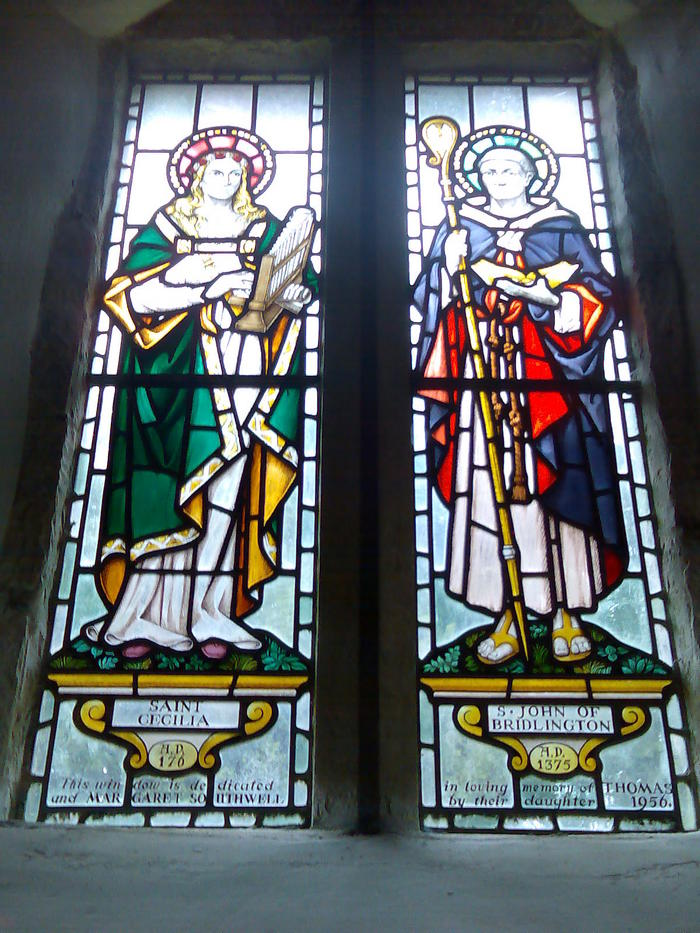
Window at All Saints, Thwing (1950s)

St John of Bridlington was commended for the integrity of his life, his scholarship, and his quiet generosity. He was the last English saint to be canonised before the English Reformation. King Henry V attributed his victory at Agincourt to the intercession in heaven of this Saint John and of Saint John of Beverley. Women in difficult labour may pray to St John of Bridlington as their patron saint and he is also associated with the local fishing industry.

At All Saints Church, Thwing, there is a window showing St John of Bridlington and St Cecilia. There is a St John Street in Bridlington named after him, an old thoroughfare linking the "Old Town" that grew up around Bridlington Priory with the quayside community of fishermen and traders. At St Andrew's Church, Hempstead, Norfolk, a wooden panel showing John of Bridlington depicts him holding a fish and in episcopal robes, though he never served as bishop.

The Wollaton Antiphonal contains the only surviving source of the melodies which form his Office.

== See also ==
- Saint John Twenge, patron saint archive
