= The Frosted Death =

First publication

"The Frosted Death" is the fifth pulp magazine story to feature The Avenger. Written by Paul Ernst, it was published in the January 1940 issue of The Avenger magazine.

== Publishing history ==
This novel was re-published under its original title by Paperback Library in October 1972.

== Summary ==
The Sangaman-Veshnir drug company has discovered a fast-growing mold that grows on meat, covering the victim with a powdered sugar-like coating: "The Frosted Death". Growing into the skin's pores and lungs, it causes death by suffocation and cannot be killed by conventional means; a speck on the skin causes death in a short time. Kindly-seeming, thoroughly evil Veshnir murders to keep the mold secret: he has a deal with Germany to mass-produce it as a weapon of war. A submarine of Nazis has infiltrated to support this effort. At his secret estate in Maine, Veshnir has set up a production facility, using dying men enslaved by blowing some mold into their brains. Benson quickly contains mould outbreaks, using detective work to identify the source. Mac works feverishly to develop an antidote. Mac and Josh are captured. Josh secretly infects Veshnir with the mold. Benson poses as one of the Nazi agents and uses the antidote to save Josh and Mac. Veshnir's production facility is destroyed. The Nazis will return to Germany and likely die.
