= Farmerphile: The Magazine of Philip José Farmer =

- Editor: Christopher Paul Carey (2005-2007); Paul Spiteri (2005-2009); Win Scott Eckert (2007-2009)
- Categories: science fiction & fantasy magazine
- Frequency: Quarterly
- Publisher: Michael Croteau
- First issue: July 2005
- Final issue: January 2009
- Country: United States
- Language: English
- Website: pjfarmer.com/farmerphile.htm

Farmerphile: The Magazine of Philip José Farmer was a quarterly digest-sized magazine which published fiction and non-fiction by and about science fiction and fantasy author Philip José Farmer. Over its first ten issues, the magazine serialized the first-time publication of Farmer's novel Up from the Bottomless Pit. This novel, as well as the short stories and public talks published in issue numbers 1–10 of Farmerphile, later appeared in book form in the collection Up from the Bottomless Pit and Other Stories. A total of fifteen issues of Farmerphile were published, from July 2005 through January 2009.

Many of the short fiction and non-fiction works were collected in Best of Farmerphile, published by Meteor House in 2017.
