= Murder on Wheels =

First publication

"Murder on Wheels" is the 13th pulp magazine story to feature The Avenger. Written by Paul Ernst, it was published in the November 1940 issue of "The Avenger” magazine.

== Publishing history ==
This novel was re-published under its original title by Paperback Library on June 1, 1973.

== Summary ==
Two criminal plots develop side-by-side: 1) theft of the indestructible Marr-Car, and of Phineas Jackson's process for steel-hardening; 2) ongoing sabotage and blackmail at the Marr plant. An auto manufacturer, Ormsdale, wants control of the process, steals the super car and pursues Jackson. Marr is being harassed by Cole Wilson, the adoptive son of Jackson, to get millions for Jackson for his process (Jackson doesn't actually want more money). Wilson, an idealist who always fights for underdogs, is Benson-like: strong, intelligent, fast, handsome, resourceful. While in face-molded disguise at the Marr plant, Benson is attacked, trapped and nearly (accidentally?) killed in the metal-hardening chamber; the radiation restores his face, skin, and hair. Wilson, in Benson's usual role, has anticipated the criminals, saved the Justice Inc. team from a fiery death, and trapped the escaping criminals inside the Marr-Car. The Justice Inc. team, impressed, invites Wilson to join the team.
