= Listed buildings in Thwing, East Riding of Yorkshire =

Thwang is a civil parish in the county of the East Riding of Yorkshire, England. It contains seven listed buildings that are recorded in the National Heritage List for England. Of these, one is listed at Grade I, the highest of the three grades, one is at Grade II*, the middle grade, and the others are at Grade II, the lowest grade. The parish contains the village of Thwing, the hamlet of Octon, and the surrounding countryside. Most of the listed buildings are houses and farmhouses, and the others are a church and a monument.

== Key ==
Grade	Criteria
I	Buildings of exceptional interest, sometimes considered to be internationally important
II*	Particularly important buildings of more than special interest
II	Buildings of national importance and special interest

== Buildings ==
Name and location	Photograph	Date	Notes	Grade
All Saints' Church; 54.11707°N 0.39659°W		12th century	The church has been altered and extended through the centuries, including a restoration and partial rebuilding by Temple Moore in 1898–1901. It is built in stone with slate roofs, and consists of a nave, a north aisle with a south chapel, a south porch, a chancel and a west tower. The tower has three stages, a chamfered plinth, bands, a clock face, two-light bell openings under a flat arch, and an embattled parapet. The south doorway is Norman, with spiral nook-shafts and capitals, and a carving in the tympanum.	I
The Old Farmhouse, Glebe Farm; 54.11452°N 0.42241°W		Late 17th century	A former cruck-framed longhouse, encased in chalk, and mainly faced in brick with some exposed chalk, and with a pantile roof. There is a single storey and an attic, and three bays. Inside, there are two trusses.	II*
Pear Tree Farmhouse; 54.11721°N 0.39418°W		Late 18th century	The farmhouse is in red brick, with stone dressings, a dentilled brick eaves cornice, and a pantile roof with tumbled-in brick to the raised gables. There are two storeys and attics, and three bays, and a lower wing on the left. The windows are sashes under channelled wedge lintels, and the attic has a casement window. The doorway at the rear has a plain surround and a gabled canopy.	II
The Wold Cottage; 54.13603°N 0.40674°W	—	Late 18th century	The house is in brick on a chamfered plinth, with stone dressings, rusticated quoins, a dentilled brick eaves cornice, and a hipped slate roof. Thee is square plan with additions to the left and at the rear, two storeys and five bays. The windows are sashes, and on the right return is a doorway with a projecting stone surround, impost blocks, a fanlight, a stepped cornice and a hood mould.	II
Monument near The Wold Cottage; 54.13405°N 0.41261°W		1799	The monument is on the site where a meteorite fell in 1795. It is in brick with stone dressings, and consists of a square pillar on a plinth, with a stepped cornice and a pyramidal cap. On one face is an inscribed tablet.	II
Home Cottage; 54.11589°N 0.45468°W	—	Early 19th century	The house is rendered and has a pantile roof. There are two storeys and three bays. In the centre is a projecting porch, the windows have pointed arches, and above the porch is a small oculus.	II
Former Post Office; 54.11557°N 0.39692°W		c. 1830	The house is in brick with a hipped slate roof. There are two storeys and three bays. The central doorway has pilasters, a semicircular fanlight with radial glazing, and a moulded cornice. The windows are sashes in architraves, on the ground floor with gauged brick segmental arches.	II
