= Thwing, East Riding of Yorkshire =

Village in the East Riding of Yorkshire, England

Thwing
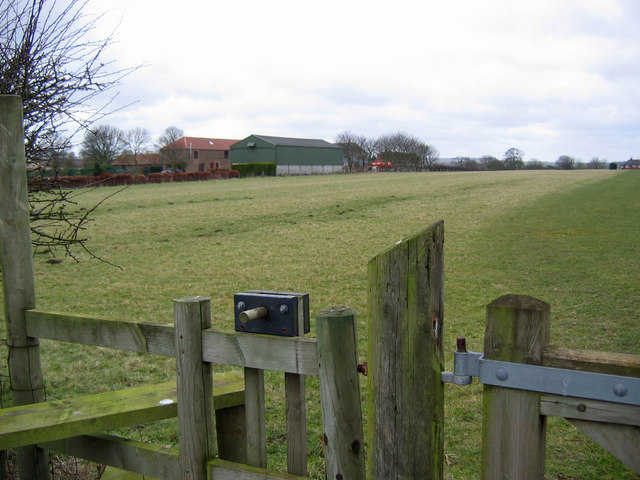
- View of Thwing from the south-west

- Location within the East Riding of Yorkshire
- Population: 203 (2011 census)
- OS grid reference: TA049701
- Civil parish: Thwing
- Unitary authority: East Riding of Yorkshire
- Ceremonial county: East Riding of Yorkshire
- Region: Yorkshire and the Humber
- Country: England
- Sovereign state: United Kingdom
- Post town: DRIFFIELD
- Postcode district: YO25
- Dialling code: 01262
- Police: Humberside
- Fire: Humberside
- Ambulance: Yorkshire
- UK Parliament: Bridlington and The Wolds

Thwing /ˈðwɪŋ/ is a village and civil parish in the Yorkshire Wolds, in the East Riding of Yorkshire, England.

== Description ==
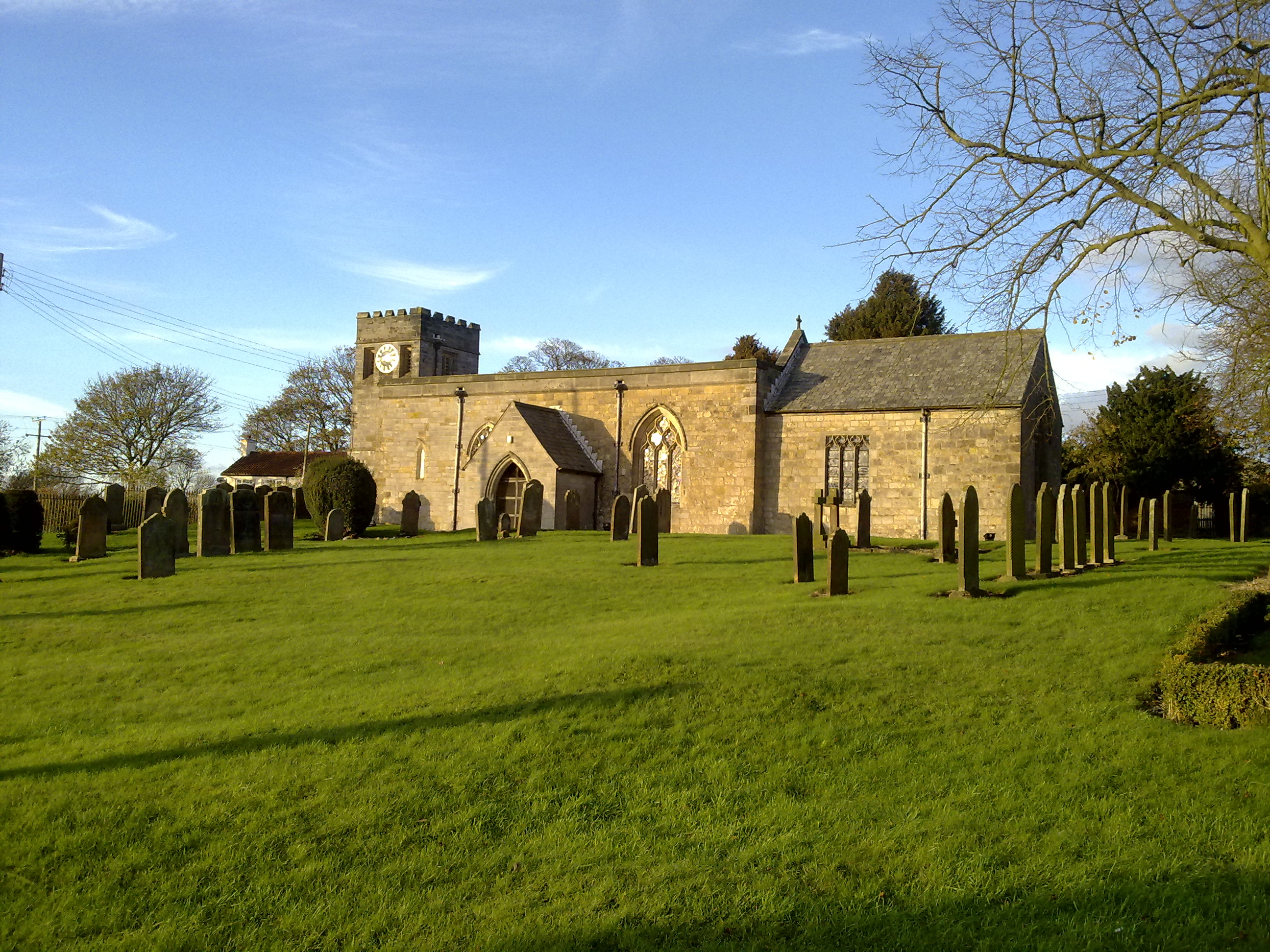
All Saints' Church, Thwing

Thwing is located in the Yorkshire Wolds about 8 miles (13 km) west of the North Sea coast at Bridlington.

The village has a 12th-century Norman Church (All Saints), and a pub known as The Falling Stone, previously The Rampant Horse, before 1976 the Raincliffe Arms.

It rises from about 148 feet (45 m) in the north-east corner of the parish to a high point of 535 feet (163 m) in the south-west. The parish covers an area of 4,024.47 acres (1,628.644 ha).

The civil parish is sparsely populated, with, according to the 2011 UK census, a population of 203, the same as the 2001 UK census figure. The main settlements are the village of Thwing and the smaller hamlet of Octon. There are farmsteads at Octon Grange, The Wold Cottage, and Willy Howe farm. Land use is almost entirely agricultural, predominately enclosed fields. There is a private crematorium, East Riding Crematorium, at Octon Crossroads, built in 1997.

Between 1894 and 1974 it was a part of the Bridlington Rural District, in the East Riding of Yorkshire. Between 1974 and 1996 it was part of the Borough of North Wolds (later Borough of East Yorkshire), in the county of Humberside.

Although the current civil parish is called "Thwing" its parish council is called "Thwing & Octon Parish Council".

The Falling Stone pub name is a reference to the Wold Cottage Meteorite, which fell nearby on 13 December 1795. A monument to its fall can be visited.

The church, as well as the post office (1830s) and 'Pear Tree farmhouse' (late 18th century) are listed buildings.

Thwing is the birthplace of the English Saint John Twenge (1320–1379).

== History and archaeology ==
See also history of Octon

Thwing is thought to mean 'narrow strip of land', deriving from thvengr (Old Scandinavian) or thweng (Old English). The village is recorded in the Domesday Book of 1086 as Tuennc, in the hundred of Burton.

There is evidence of significant human activity in the area beginning in at least the Neolithic Era: at Paddock Hill 0.6 miles (1 km) north of Octon, evidence of a henge dating from the late Neolithic has been discovered from crop marks and by excavation. The same site also shows evidence of re-use and modification into a hill fort during the Bronze Age, including artefacts typical of the Urnfield culture, and evidence of bronze metalworking. The site was re-used during the Anglo-Saxon period and contained houses including a grubenhaus and large rectangular hall; there was a cemetery with at least 130 inhumations east of the Bronze Age earthwork. During the 1200s a post mill was constructed. (Note: 54.122072°N 0.424974°W, Paddock Hill)

The church of All Saints dates from the 12th century. A market and fair began in Thwing in 1257.

Two tumuli have been recorded and excavated in the northern part of the parish: the large mound named 'Willy Howe'; (Note: 54.136067°N 0.376626°W, Willy Howe) and another barrow, about 0.5 mi (0.8 km) to its west, in fields south of the village of Wold Newton. (Note: 54.133643°N 0.392793°W, probable location of barrow excavated by Greenwell (see Note above).) (Note: quote: "About half a mile east from it is a very large barrow called Willy Howe, which was partly opened by the late Lord Londesborough [...] while about 300yds. to the north is another barrow, much above the ordinary size, though still not to be compared in that respect with Willy Howe." The description of the location given matches a tumulus shown on the 1:10560 and 1:2500 scale Ordnance Survey maps up to 1950, afterwards labelled as site of, or absent. The barrow to the north appears to be that opened by John Robert Mortimer (barrow 284, TA 0484 7261) in 1894, which was recorded by Mortimer to have been excavated by Lord Londesborough in 1857, and by Greenwell in 1887.)

A Wesleyan chapel was established in Thwing in the early 1800s. It was built around 1810, and rebuilt and enlarged around 1839.

From the 1850s to the start of the 21st century the extent of building development in the village was practically unchanged.

There are several other structures identified as barrows in the parish. Other evidence of pre-historic settlement and activity include polished stone axes and flint implements including arrowheads, chisels and knives, as well as flint cores, tranchet axes and microliths; pebble maceheads; and bronze or Iron Age pottery. A late Bronze Age (c. 1150 to 750 BC) penannular ring of pale and yellow gold applied on a base metal core was found by metal detection in 2004 near Thwing.

Finds of Roman pottery, including Samian ware, provide evidence of occupation during the Roman era, and a potential Romano-British settlement has been located about 0.6 miles (1 km) north-east of Thwing, with nearby rectilinear enclosures and trackways dating from the Iron Age or Roman period.

A monastic grange associated with Meaux Abbey was recorded at Octon Grange, north of Octon, in the 12th century.

The Wold Cottage meteorite fell in the parish in 1795, and is commemorated by a monument.

In 1812 the parish's population was recorded as 268 persons in 37 houses; the predominant occupation was farming. According to Sheahan, in the 1850s the parish had a total population of 599, and an area of 4,060 acres (1,640 ha), the population had risen by a factor of two in the first half of the 19th century. It fell during the last decades of the 19th century and the first half of the 20th century: by 1951 it was below the 1811 population level. By the 1961 census the population had been reduced to 244.

== See also ==
- John Twenge (Saint John of Bridlington) was born in Thwing in 1320 or 1324.
- Marmaduke Thweng, 1st Baron Thweng
- Thomas Lamplugh, Archbishop of York was born in Thwing in 1615
- Listed buildings in Thwing, East Riding of Yorkshire
