= The Sky Walker =

The Sky Walker is the third pulp magazine story to feature The Avenger. Written by Paul Ernst, it was published in the November 1939 issue of The Avenger magazine.

== Publishing history ==
This novel was re-published under its original title by Paperback Library in August 1972.

== Summary ==
The Sky Walker seems to be a man walking in the air over Chicago, pushing a barrel-sized object. His appearance is associated with shattering glass, vanishing railroad tracks that cause a train to derail, the collapse of an office building and a pavilion. People panic, fearing foreign invasion. Inventors Max and Robert Gant are murdered by criminals, and Josh and Rosabel Newton, the Gants' servants, are enlisted by Benson to help in the investigation. The Gants invented a means of making a glassite airplane truly invisible (except for the engine) and a vibration mechanism that can reduce a target substances to hydrogen. The criminals use the plane and vibrator to cause the public to lose trust in any steel not made from ore taken from the Catawbi Range, controlled by the gang. The gang, well-organized and ruthless, almost succeeds. Benson disguises himself as a gang member, interferes with the plane's invisibility treatment, and frees himself and his aides from a death trap. The gang escapes in the now-visible plane, and is shot from the sky by the army.
