= Justice, Inc. =

"Justice, Inc." is the first pulp magazine story to feature The Avenger. Written by Paul Ernst, it was published in the September 1939 issue of The Avenger magazine.

== Publishing history ==
This novel was re-published under its original title by the Paperback Library in June 1972.

== Summary ==
Richard Henry Benson, aggressive, dominating, cold-eyed, self-made millionaire adventurer, forces himself and his family onto a Buffalo/Montreal private charter flight (his mother-in-law is dying). He goes to the washroom and his wife and daughter vanish. The other passengers deny having seen them, the crew claim he boarded the plane alone, and even their empty seats are cold, as if no one ever occupied them. A frantic Benson is subdued and hospitalized with "brain fever" and head trauma. Recovering, his face and hair are white, and his facial flesh is paralyzed and malleable. Investigating, Benson meets pharmacist/chemist Fergus MacMurdie, who DID see Benson's family, and gigantic engineer Algernon Heathcote Smith (Smitty), who agree to assist him. Benson fights and overcomes Smitty using nerve pressure. Benson has a custom compact .22 caliber gun and light throwing knife (Mike & Ike), shoots to crease the top of the skull and render unconscious rather than kill, is a master of disguise, and prefers maneuvering enemies into their own traps over killing. THE PLOT: A criminal gang abducts wealthy Buffalo residents, drops them from a plane over Lake Ontario, and holds them prisoner on an island, all to get control of a Buffalo company. The three of them end the scheme, but Benson's wife and child aren’t found, alive or dead, among the kidnapping victims. The trio form Justice, Inc. to bring criminals to justice.

== Comic adaptations ==
The two covers for the 1989 issues.

Pages 34 + 35 from the 1989 issue #1.

A DC Comics title called Justice Inc. began in issue #1 (May–June 1975) and ran to issue #4 (November–December 1975). This series adapted the eponymous novel and continued with original stories which featured the Avenger and took place during the time the original Avenger novels were released. Jack Kirby provided the artwork for issues #2–4.

A two-issue limited series published by DC Comics in 1989 under the same title featured the Avenger and his agents in an updated, contemporary setting several years after their retirement.
