= Stockholders in Death =

First publication

"Stockholders in Death" is the seventh pulp magazine story to feature The Avenger. Written by Paul Ernst, it was published in the April 1940 issue of “The Avenger” magazine. The novel was republished under its original title by Paperback Library on December 1, 1972.

== Summary ==
Lawyer Joseph Crimm is killed for his stock holdings in a scheme by the directors of Town Bank to control Ballandale Glass Corp. Crimm's two sons want justice: Wayne goes to Justice, Inc., skeptical Tom enlists Nicky Lucknow, a gangster. The bank directors murder one of their own who is having cold feet. Single-handedly, the Avenger (Richard Henry Benson) attempts to rescue foolish Tom from Lucknow's hotel. Benson declares "financial war" on the bank and its directors. Lucknow plays Tom for a fool, using him as a pawn and fall guy for crimes. A veiled woman tries to help Tom. Benson causes half of Lucknow's gang to fall into their own burning death trap. Justice, Inc. is wanted for murder after gangsters posing as Benson, Mac, and Smitty shoot several policemen. Wayne and Tom must repeatedly be saved from the consequences of their own foolish actions. The criminals are finally trapped on Benson's freighter, the Minerva, which they attempt to sink with Benson and his team aboard; the mastermind behind the stock swindle is exposed and the trapped criminals will be arrested for piracy.
