= The Yellow Hoard =

"The Yellow Hoard" is the 2nd pulp magazine story to feature The Avenger. Written by Paul Ernst, it was published in the October 1939 issue of The Avenger magazine.

== Publishing history ==
This novel was re-published under its original title by Paperback Library on July 1972.

== Summary ==
Smitty sees a house explode, and grabs a suspicious character and takes him to Mac's drugstore. Drugged and hypnotized, the man reveals that a small, peanut-shaped bomb was used in a plot to get 5 clay bricks originally from southern Mexico. The bricks are archeological artifacts found by Professor Archer Gray, distributed among some of the expedition members for safekeeping. Gray is killed for his 2 bricks, and the gang murders and uses the small bombs to cause other explosions. Gray's daughter, Nellie, is slow to trust Benson, but helps the trio pursue the criminals. She also acts on her own, roughing up criminals independently. The bricks each contain a segment of a golden belt inscribed with directions to huge Aztec treasure. Both Justice Inc. and the criminals have enough information to take them to the vicinity of the treasure in Mexico. In a battle involving hidden temples, Aztec gold, secret passageways, traps, escapes, etc., the criminals are thwarted and fall into their own traps. Justice Inc. ends up with the largest amount of gold in the world to finance its activities.
