= The Flame Breathers =

The Flame Breathers is the 12th pulp magazine story to feature The Avenger. Written by Paul Ernst, it was published in the September 1940 issue of The Avenger magazine. With this issue, The Avenger magazine switched to a bi-monthly schedule.

This novel was re-published under its original title by Paperback Library on May 1, 1973. The pulp cover art was by George Gross.
