= The Blood Ring =

- Short story by Paul Ernst
- First publication

Publication
- Published in: The Avenger
- Publication date: March 1, 1940

"The Blood Ring" is the sixth pulp magazine story to feature The Avenger. Written by Paul Ernst, it was published in the March 1940 issue of The Avenger magazine. This novel was re-published under its original title by Paperback Library on November 1, 1972.

== Summary ==
Egyptian artifacts intended for the Braintree Museum in Washington, D.C. are stolen. Mysterious figures from ancient Egypt are sighted at night, people are murdered, a mummy speaks and walks, people have terrible headaches and seem to be taken over by their pre-incarnations as ancient Egyptians. The "Blood Ring" is set with a pink cornelian stone that is made blood red and filled with power if it is dipped in human blood every 48 hours.

Nellie Gray is prominent on the list of intended sacrifices, and Smitty, rescuing her at one point, Samson-like, pulls down a reproduction Egyptian temple in the museum. Josh guards the Egyptian exhibit at night after a guard is killed and another quits; realistically nervous, he displays none of the typical feet-shuffling eye-rolling mannerisms often found in the pulps of this time.

Benson's scientific sleuthing reveals that Egyptian symbolism, drugs, hypnosis, and technology were used by the villain as part of a blackmail scheme. Typically, Benson turns the villain and his gang against one another, and tricks them into dying in their own death trap.
