= Fordon, East Riding of Yorkshire =

Village in the East Riding of Yorkshire, England

Coordinates: 54.161787°N 0.393242°W

Fordon
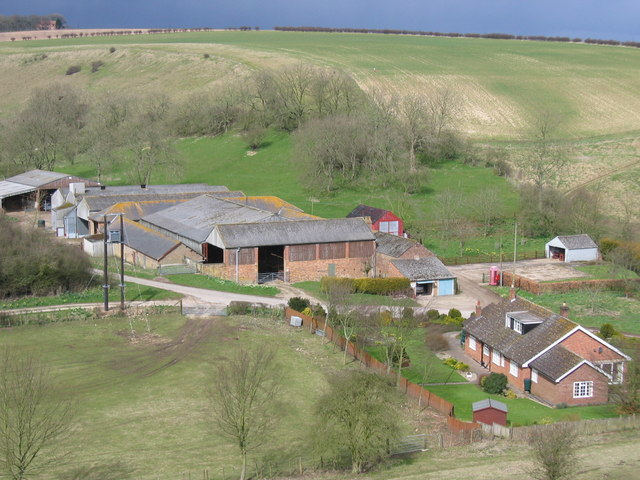
- View of Fordon

- Location within the East Riding of Yorkshire
- OS grid reference: TA050751
  - London: 185 mi (298 km) S
- Civil parish: Wold Newton
- Unitary authority: East Riding of Yorkshire
- Ceremonial county: East Riding of Yorkshire
- Region: Yorkshire and the Humber
- Country: England
- Sovereign state: United Kingdom
- Post town: DRIFFIELD
- Postcode district: YO25
- Dialling code: 01262
- Police: Humberside
- Fire: Humberside
- Ambulance: Yorkshire
- UK Parliament: Bridlington and The Wolds

Fordon is a village and former civil parish, now in the parish of Wold Newton, in the East Riding of Yorkshire, England, near the border with North Yorkshire. It is situated approximately 8 miles (13 km) south of Scarborough and 10 miles (16 km) north-west of Bridlington. In 1931 the parish had a population of 29.

There is a small church dedicated to St James that is now a Grade II* listed building.

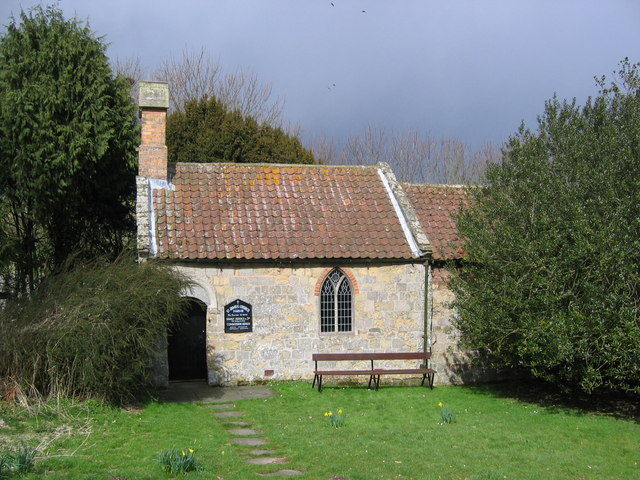
St James' Church

The name Fordon, first attested in the Domesday Book of 1086 as Fordun, Fordune, and Forduna, is thought to come from the Old English words fore ('in front of') and dūn ('hill'). Thus it once meant 'In front of the hill'.

In 1823 Fordon was in the parish of Hunmanby and the Wapentake of Dickering. Occupations at the time included three farmers.

Fordon was formerly a township in the parish of Hunmanby, from 1866 Fordon was a civil parish in its own right, on 1 April 1935 the parish was abolished and merged with Wold Newton.

== See also ==
- Listed buildings in Wold Newton, East Riding of Yorkshire
