= River of Ice =

First publication

"The River of Ice" is the 11th pulp magazine story to feature The Avenger. Written by Paul Ernst, it was published in the July 1940 issue of The Avenger magazine.

== Publishing history ==
This novel was re-published under its original title by Paperback Library on April 1, 1973.

== Summary ==
In a cave under a glacier (the "River of Ice") in British Columbia, Brent and Lini Waller find a time capsule with treasure, artifacts, and manuscripts from an advanced, pre-Ice Age civilization. Lini seeks to sell the cave contents to the Wittwar Foundation. Benson declines to lead an expedition to the cave. Lini is kidnapped, and a steel needle is pounded into her brain, a pre-Ice Age mind control technique. She leads the Justice Inc. team into several death traps, including a room filled with dry ice and a building that falls on their car. Mac and Josh, sent to locate the cave, are captured by the criminals. Nellie, captured, apparently has a needle inserted in her brain. Flying to the cave, under Lini's control, Nellie strands Benson, Smitty, and Rosabel in a remote location. Benson had planned for a second plane, delivered by a young Canadian pilot, but accidentally crashes it and is captured. The mastermind seeks the ancient cold light technology which lights the cave, removes all the ancient artifacts, and sets an explosion that buries the cave with the Justice Inc. team inside. Benson arranged for the explosion to destroy the criminals, and escapes the cave using ancient advanced technology.
