= Listed buildings in Wold Newton, East Riding of Yorkshire =

Wold Newton is a civil parish in the county of the East Riding of Yorkshire, England. It contains ten listed buildings that are recorded in the National Heritage List for England. Of these, two are listed at Grade II*, the middle of the three grades, and the others are at Grade II, the lowest grade. The parish contains the village of Wold Newton, the hamlet of Fordon, and the surrounding countryside. One of the listed buildings, a church, is in Fordon, and the others are in Wold Newton, consisting of another church, a house, a farmhouse, two former vicarages, a former chapel, a public house and a telephone kiosk.

== Key ==
Grade	Criteria
II*	Particularly important buildings of more than special interest
II	Buildings of national importance and special interest

== Buildings ==
Name and location	Photograph	Date	Notes	Grade
All Saints' Church; 54.14340°N 0.40065°W		12th century	The church has been altered and extended through the centuries, including additions in 1857, and a restoration in 1898–99 by Temple Moore. It is built in stone, with a lead roof to the nave and slate roofs elsewhere. The church consists of a four-bay nave, a south porch and a two-bay chancel. On the west end of the nave is a timber framed bell turret with a pyramidal roof and a cross finial. The round-arched south doorway is Norman, and has one order with nook shafts and scalloped capitals, and carvings of a wheel and a partridge. In the tympanum is chequer decoration and a Maltese cross. The chancel arch is also Norman.	II*
St James' Church, Fordon; 54.16109°N 0.39388°W		12th century	A small church that has been altered and extended through the centuries, including a restoration in 1876. It is built in stone with patchwork in red brick, and has a pantile roof. The church consists of a nave and a lower chancel, and on the west gable is a bellcote in yellow brick. The south doorway is Norman, and has a segmental tympanum containing a carved cross, and above it is a datestone.	II*
The Old Vicarage; 54.14310°N 0.40132°W	—	Late 17th to early 18th century	The vicarage, later used for other purposes, is in chalk and whitewashed brick, with a stepped brick eaves cornice, and a pantile roof. It has is one storey and two bays. On the front is a doorway with a chamfered timber lintel, a sash window on its left and a tripartite casement window on the right.	II
Pear Tree Farmhouse; 54.14198°N 0.39938°W		18th century	The farmhouse is in chalk, mainly rendered, on stone footings, with a stone plinth, quoins, a timber bracketed eaves cornice, and a pantile roof. There are two storeys and three bays, and a rear outshut. The central doorway has a gabled porch, pilasters and an elliptical head. The windows are sashes, those on the ground floor with channelled lintels and raised keystones.	II
Wold Newton Hall; 54.14267°N 0.40001°W	—	c. 1800	The house, which was extended in 1903–04 by Temple Moore, is in brick with stone dressings and slate roofs. The main block has three storeys and three bays, the middle bay projecting as a full-height canted bay window with two storeys, containing a doorway and sash windows. Above is a coped parapet and a triple-span roof, hipped on the front and with coped gables at the rear. To the left is an extension with two storeys and three bays, connected to the main block by a lower two-bay wing.	II
Old Hall Farmhouse; 54.14460°N 0.40176°W	—	Early 19th century	The farmhouse is in red brick, with stone dressings, a stepped brick eaves cornice, and a slate roof. There are two storeys and cellars, two bays, and a later rear extension. The doorway is in the right gable end, and has an architrave, a rectangular fanlight with sunburst glazing, and a wedge lintel. The windows are sashes, those in the original part under wedge lintels. The extension has two bays, rubbed brick quoins, a bow window, and sash windows under flat gauged brick arches.	II
The Anvil Arms Public House and cottage 54.14169°N 0.39928°W		Early 19th century	The public house and cottage on the left are in rendered brick, and have a pantile roof, hipped on the left, and with oversailing eaves and a gable on the right. There are two storeys and eight bays. On the front are two doorways, and the windows are sashes, mainly horizontally sliding.	II
The Hollies; 54.14293°N 0.40159°W	—	1839	Originally a vicarage, the house is in whitewashed brick on a plinth with stone capping, and has a hipped slate roof. There are two storeys, a rectangular plan, and two bays. The doorway is on the right return, and has pilasters, a rectangular fanlight and a moulded cornice. The windows are sashes under shallow segmental brick arches.	II
Wesleyan Chapel; 54.14409°N 0.40132°W		1839	The chapel, later the village hall, is in brick, rendered on the left gable, on a chamfered stone plinth, with stone dressings, a timber eaves cornice, and a slate roof with raised coped gables. There is one storey and three bays, and a projecting central gabled porch. The windows have pointed heads and intersecting tracery under stone arches, and above the porch is an inscribed datestone.	II
Telephone kiosk 54.14154°N 0.39962°W		1935	The telephone kiosk is of the K6 type designed by Giles Gilbert Scott. Constructed in cast iron with a square plan and a dome, it has three unperforated crowns in the top panels.	II
