= Paul Ernst (American writer) =

American novelist

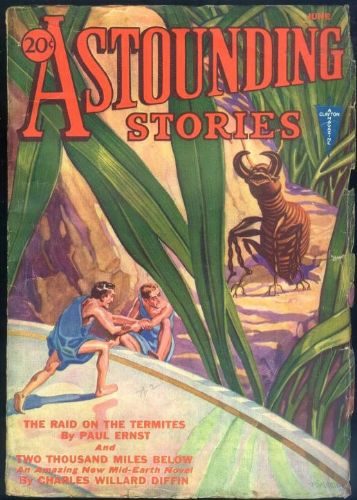
Ernst's novella "The Raid on the Termites" was the cover story in the June 1932 Astounding Stories

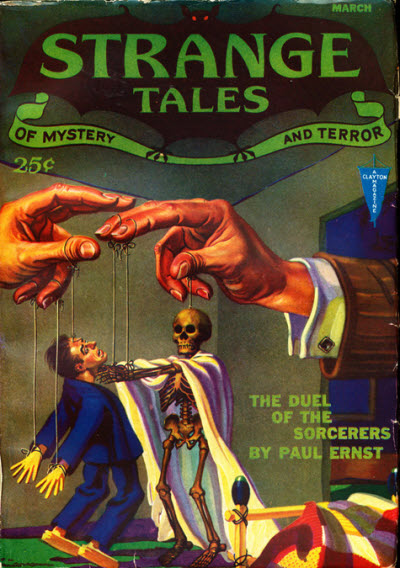
Ernst's novella "The Duel of the Sorcerers" took the cover of the March 1932 issue of Strange Tales

Paul Frederick Ernst (November 7, 1899 – September 21, 1985) was an American pulp fiction writer. He is best known as the writer of the original 24 "Avenger" novels, published by Street & Smith under the house name Kenneth Robeson.

== Biography ==
Paul Ernst was born in Akron, Ohio. He "[took] up fiction writing in his early twenties". "A prolific manufacturer of potboilers-made-to-order," his stories appeared in a number of early science fiction and fantasy magazines. His writing appeared in Astounding Stories, Strange Tales and Amazing, and he was the author of the Doctor Satan series (8 stories in all) which ran in Weird Tales from 1935 to 1936. His most famous work was in writing the original 24 The Avenger stories in the eponymous pulp magazine between 1939 and 1942.

When pulp magazine work began to dry up, Ernst "was able to make a painless transition into the more prestigious "slick" magazines, where his word skill earned him higher financial rewards." As of 1971, he was "still active as a writer," including penning "Blackout" for the July 1971 issue of Good Housekeeping magazine. He died in Pinellas County, Florida in September 1985, at age 85.

== Bibliography ==
=== Dr. Satan series ===
- Dr. Satan (1935)
- The Man Who Chained the Lightning (1935)
- Hollywood Horror (1935)
- The Consuming Flame (1935)
- Horror Insured (1936)
- Beyond Death's Gateway (1936)
- The Devil's Double (1936)
- Mask of Death (1936)

=== The Avenger series (as Kenneth Robeson) ===
- Justice, Inc (1939,1972)
- The Yellow Hoard (1939, 1972)
- The Sky Walker (1939, 1972)
- The Devil's Horns (1939, 1972)
- The Frosted Death (1940, 1972)
- The Blood Ring (1940, (1972)
- Stockholders in Death (1940, 1972)
- The Glass Mountain (1940, 1973)
- Tuned for Murder (1940, 1973)
- The Smiling Dogs (1940, 1973)
- River of Ice (1940, 1973)
- The Flame Breathers (1940, 1973)
- Murder on Wheels (1940, 1973)
- The Three Gold Crowns (1940, 1973)
- House of Death (1941, 1973)
- The Hate Master (1941, 1973)
- Nevlo (1941, 1973)
- Death in Slow Motion (1941, 1973)
- Pictures of Death (1941, 1973)
- The Green Killer (1942, 1974)
- The Happy Killers (1942, 1974)
- The Black Death (1942, 1974)
- The Wilder Curse (1942, 1974)
- Midnight Murder (1942, 1974)

credits	title	publisher	year
Ernest Jason Fredericks	Shakedown Hotel	Ace Books	1958
Paul Ernst	The Complete Tales of Doctor Satan	Altus Press	2013
	Twelve Who Were Damned and Other Stories	Ramble House	2016
	The Complete Tales of Seekay	Steeger Books	2018
	Rulers of the Future	Armchair Fiction	2019
	Red Hell of Jupiter	Armchair Fiction	2012

=== Critical studies and reviews ===
- Lupoff, Richard A. (Dec 2013). "Locus Looks at Books : Divers Hands". Locus (635): 23, 53–54. Reviews The complete tales of Doctor Satan.
