= The Smiling Dogs =

First publication

The Smiling Dogs is the 10th pulp magazine story to feature The Avenger. Written by Paul Ernst, it was published in the June 1, 1940 issue of The Avenger magazine.

== Publishing history ==
This novel was re-published under its original title by Paperback Library on March 1, 1973.

== Summary ==
A gang murders and schemes to control a remote Montana national park with resources (apparently helium) that will be vital in any upcoming war. The mastermind's strategy is to convince key figures, including Congressmen, that they are seeing things, and to threaten to publicly expose this apparent insanity. The apparition is a remarkably uninvolving small red man leading a smiling green dog, etc.; one of the blackmail targets throws a chair at the small man, which seems about right. Benson must break a code, the team does detective work, Benson impersonates powerful men and infiltrates Congress. He ignores his team's peril out of patriotic duty to protect the country. Nellie escapes from a deathtrap, but is trapped again, and manipulated by the mastermind to trap the team in a tunnel under the Potomac. The mastermind and his gang die, with Benson's help, in their own flooding death trap, from which the Justice, Inc. team escapes with a quite small margin for error. The real reason for the scheme: deposits of pitchblende (radium ore).
