= The Glass Mountain (pulp) =

First publication

"The Glass Mountain" is the 8th pulp magazine story to feature The Avenger. Written by Paul Ernst, it was published in the February 1940 issue of The Avenger magazine.

== Publishing history ==
This novel was re-published under its original title by Warner Paperback Library Edition in January 1973.

== Summary ==
An Idaho railroad project tunnels through Mount Rainod (a black basalt "Glass Mountain"). A green mist column appears electrocuting men. An elderly Pawnee scares workers with tales of a rain god in the mountain. Benson is asked to investigate and get the project back on track. Josh, prominent in the action, acts as camp cook and is remarkably heroic throughout. Revived by Benson after being electrocuted, Josh is left realistically thoughtful; he describes death as like being unconscious. Mac, also shocked, is saved by heavy rubber soles. The villain impersonates Benson and commits murder. Tampering with project surveys occurs. Nellie Gray's rather minor role imperils her more than usual. Both Benson and one of the gang pose as the elderly Pawnee—at one point the story has three old Indians. The villain learned that the mountain is hollow; he can build a tunnel at a fraction of the projected cost, pocketing the difference. The tunnel is flooded deliberately from an underground stream to stop work and kill Benson and his team; typically, this planned death trap destroys the criminals.
