= Tarzan Alive: A Definitive Biography of Lord Greystoke =

1972 fictional biography by Philip José Farmer

- Dust cover of the first edition
- Author: Philip José Farmer
- Language: English
- Genre: Fictional biography
- Publisher: Doubleday
- Publication date: 1972 (hardcover); 1973 (paperback)
- Publication place: United States
- Media type: Print (hardcover)
- Pages: 312
- ISBN: 0-385-03886-0

Tarzan Alive: A Definitive Biography of Lord Greystoke is a fictional biography by American author Philip José Farmer that alleges the life of Edgar Rice Burroughs' character Tarzan is the story of a real person. The book was first published in hardcover by Doubleday in 1972, with a paperback edition following from Popular Library in 1973 and a trade paperback edition from Bison Books in 2006. The first British edition was published by Panther in 1974.

The book is written on the premise that Tarzan was an actual person with original author Burroughs having written highly fictionalized and romanticized memoirs of Tarzan, which were based on Tarzan's own life stories and adventures. Farmer is then telling the "real story". Farmer examines the psychological make up of John Clayton (Tarzan's real name in the novels) and his peers, based on close readings of the various Burroughs books, accepting some of Burroughs' concepts and rejecting others in an attempt at greater verisimilitude. Among his conceits is that, since the apes described by Burroughs had a spoken language that Tarzan learned, these animals must have been "pithecanthropoids": "a group of rare hominids who are probably now extinct" and "not great apes".

A more recent reprint of Tarzan Alive includes a new foreword by Win Scott Eckert and introduction by Mike Resnick, along with "An Exclusive Interview with Lord Greystoke" and "Extracts from the Memoirs of "Lord Greystoke".

The text of Tarzan Alive links the characters from the Tarzan mythos to dozens of other fictional literary characters as members of Farmer's "Wold Newton family".

== See also ==
- Philip José Farmer bibliography, for other Tarzan-related Farmer works
- Doc Savage: His Apocalyptic Life (1973), another Farmer "fictional biography"
