= Peter Caras =

American illustrator (1941–2022)

Peter George Caras (April 11, 1941 – February 28, 2022) was an American illustrator. He studied at the Art Institute of Pittsburgh and the Art Students League of New York and was instructed by Frank J. Reilly, James Bama, and Norman Rockwell. He was an instructor of Advanced Pictorial Illustration at the duCret School of the Arts in Plainfield, NJ

Caras had an international reputation and was considered one of Americas foremost illustrators. His work has excited movie goers, inspired readers of countless books and magazines, and has sold numerous products through advertising print campaigns. At age 18 having set extremely high goals for himself, he sought out the legendary Norman Rockwell for guidance. Their friendship lasted until Rockwell's death in 1978. During Rockwell's twilight years, he wrote to Caras saying that he had “admiration” for his work.

At age 21, Caras met the Western artist James Bama, who became his friend and mentor.

Caras has won numerous awards and is represented in public, corporate, and private collections. Caras has donated and contributed to charitable organizations and community projects. He was also an instructor of Advanced Pictorial Illustration at the duCret School of the Arts for four decades.

Caras died on February 28, 2022, aged 80.

== Awards ==
- 1967 Award--Society of Illustrators, NYC
- 1969 Award—Society of Illustrators, NYC
- 1970 Award—Society of Illustrators, NYC
- 1972 Award—Society of Illustrators, NYC
- 1988 “Man of the Year” Achievement Award, Inter-Council Group, PA
- Key to the City of Johnstown, PA, presented by the Mayor for outstanding contributions to the Flood Museum.

== External articles ==
- https://archive.centraljersey.com/2002/05/31/artist-drew-inspiration-from-norman-rockwell-illustrators-work-part-of-all-aboard-the-arts-ii-festival/
- http://toomuchhorrorfiction.blogspot.com/2018/02/your-pretty-face-is-going-to-hell-cover.html
- https://stevehollandbook.com/f/peter-caras--rest-in-peace
