= Thomas Lamplugh =

Archbishop of York from 1688 to 1691

The Most Reverend Thomas Lamplugh
- Archbishop of York
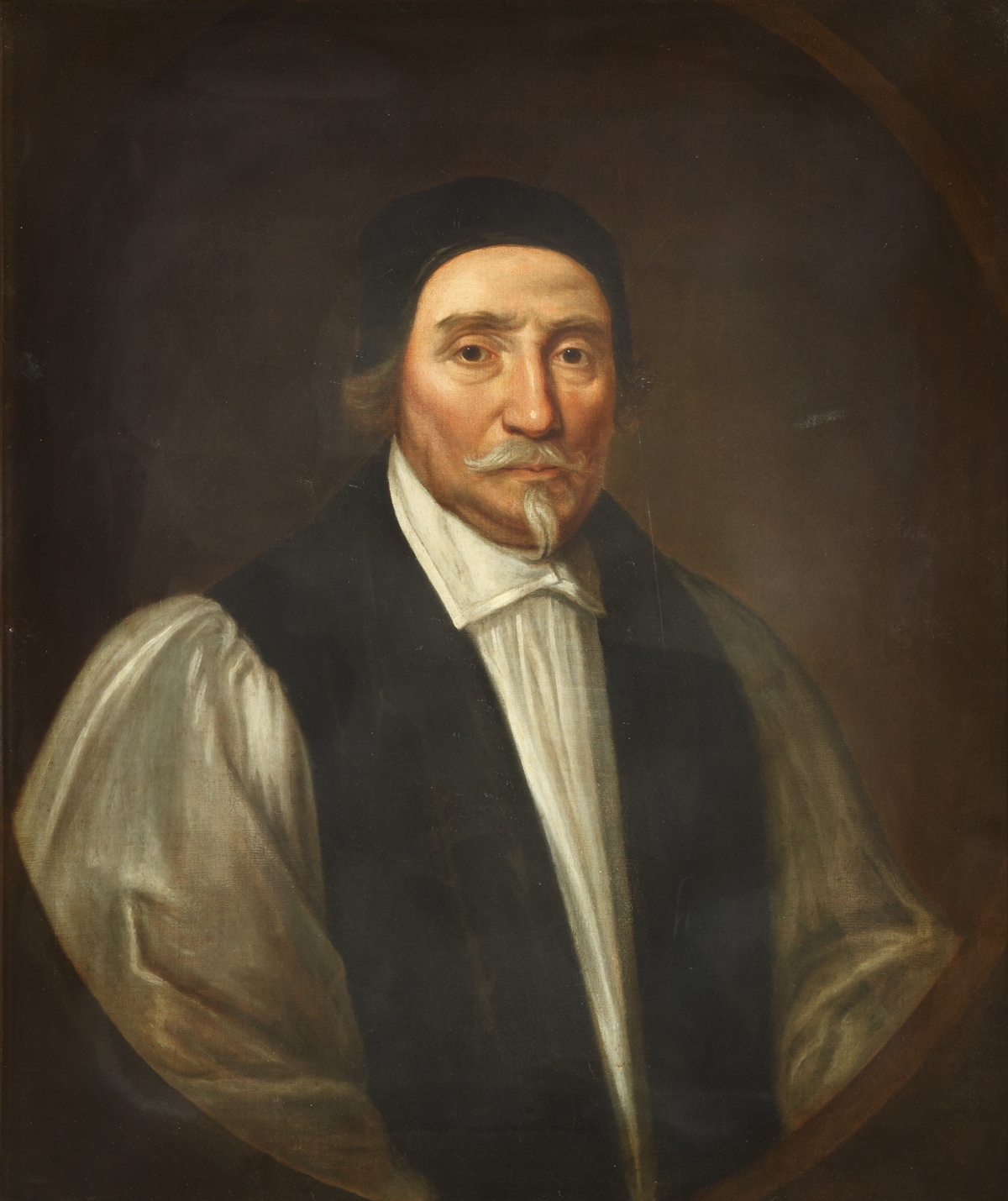
- Portrait by Godfrey Kneller
- Church: Church of England
- Province: Province of York
- Diocese: Diocese of York
- Elected: 28 November 1688
- In office: 8 December 1688 (election confirmed)–1691 (died)
- Predecessor: Vacant (last held by John Dolben)
- Successor: John Sharp
- Other posts: Archdeacon of Oxford (1663–1664 {deposed}); Archdeacon of London (27 May 1664–1676); Principal of St Alban Hall, Oxford (August 1664–1673); Vicar of St Martin-in-the-Fields (1 July 1670–1676); Dean of Rochester (3 March 1673 {instituted}–1688); Bishop of Exeter (3 October 1676 {elected}–1688)

Personal details
- Born: 1615 Thwing, East Riding of Yorkshire, England
- Died: 5 May 1691 (aged 75–76) Bishopthorpe, Yorkshire, England
- Buried: York Minster
- Denomination: Anglican
- Residence: Bishopthorpe Palace (at death)
- Parents: Christopher Lamplugh & Anne Lamplugh (née Roper)
- Spouse: Katherine (née Davenant; m. 1663; she d. 1671)
- Children: 5 children
- Education: St Bees School
- Alma mater: The Queen's College, Oxford

Ordination history of Thomas Lamplugh
History
Diaconal ordination
- Ordained by: Robert Skinner, Bishop of Oxford
- Date: 17 March 1644
- Place: Church of All Saints, Cuddesdon
Priestly ordination
- Ordained by: Robert Skinner, Bishop of Oxford
- Date: 1 June 1645
- Place: Trinity College, Oxford chapel
Episcopal consecration
- Principal consecrator: Henry Compton
- Co-consecrators: Seth Ward
- Date: 12 November 1676
- Place: Lambeth Palace

Thomas Lamplugh (1615 – 5 May 1691) was an English churchman who became Archbishop of York.

== Life ==
He was the son of Christopher Lamplugh of Thwing, Yorkshire, and his wife Anne, daughter and coheir of Thomas Roper of Octon in the East Riding of Yorkshire whom he married on 23 November 1607 at Ruston Parva, East Riding of Yorkshire. Many sources incorrectly cite his father as Thomas, an MP for Cumberland, whose family had been seated at Dovenby in that county for a number of generations. There is an interpolation in the parish register of Lamplugh, Cumbria which has his baptism taking place on 13 June 1615.

Lamplugh was educated at St Bees School and The Queen's College, Oxford.

He was Dean of Rochester from 1673, and, from 1676, Bishop of Exeter. While in Exeter, he retained the Rochester deanery in commendam until his translation to York in 1688.

On receiving the news of the arrival of William of Orange at Brixham in Torbay, Bishop Lamplugh delivered a public address, in which he exhorted the people of his diocese to remain faithful to King James II. He fled to London, together with Dr. Annesley, the Dean. As a reward for Lamplugh's loyalty, James procured him the Archbishopric of York, which had been kept vacant for two years. He was confirmed in his new see before William's arrival in London, but his Jacobitism was of no very profound character and did not prevent him from assisting at William's coronation. He died at Bishopthorpe on 5 May 1691, and was buried in York Minster on 8 May 1691.

John Bowes Morrell (York Monuments p. 38) states that Lamplugh's monument in York Minster shows him "standing, appropriately grasping the pastoral staff that he finally secured by making his views agree with those in power as each change took place – he was a veritable Vicar of Bray. Drake quotes the French proverb: "To lie like an epitaph", and it might well be applied to the one on this monument, which reads: "At length, though he had solicitously declined that dignity, he was promoted to this metropolitan see ... "

== Family ==
Lamplugh married Katherine Davenant on 25 November 1663 in Gillingham, Dorset and had five children. His surviving son was Thomas Davenant Lamplugh, D.D.

== Gallery ==
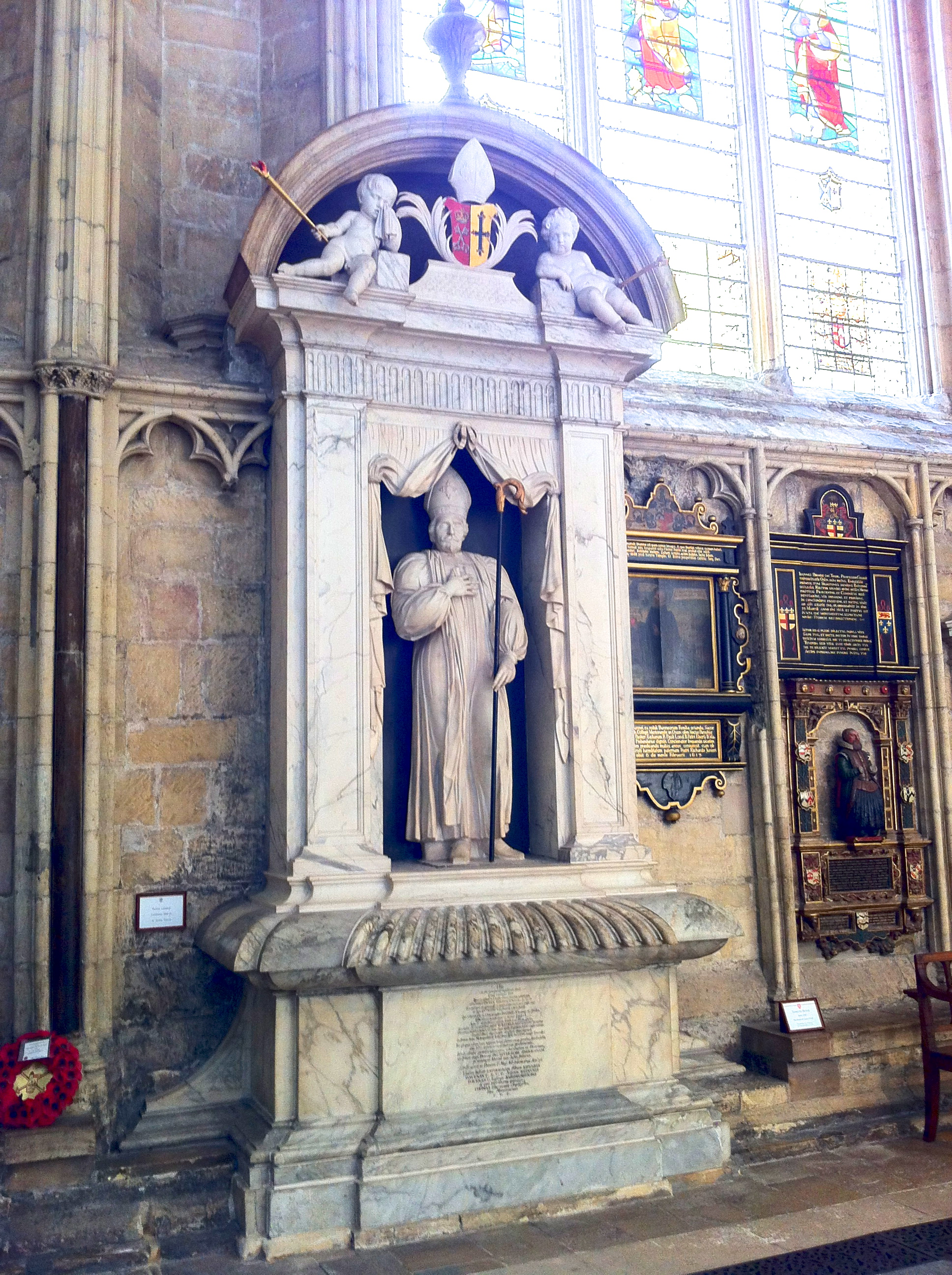
The memorial to Lamplugh in the south choir aisle at York Minster

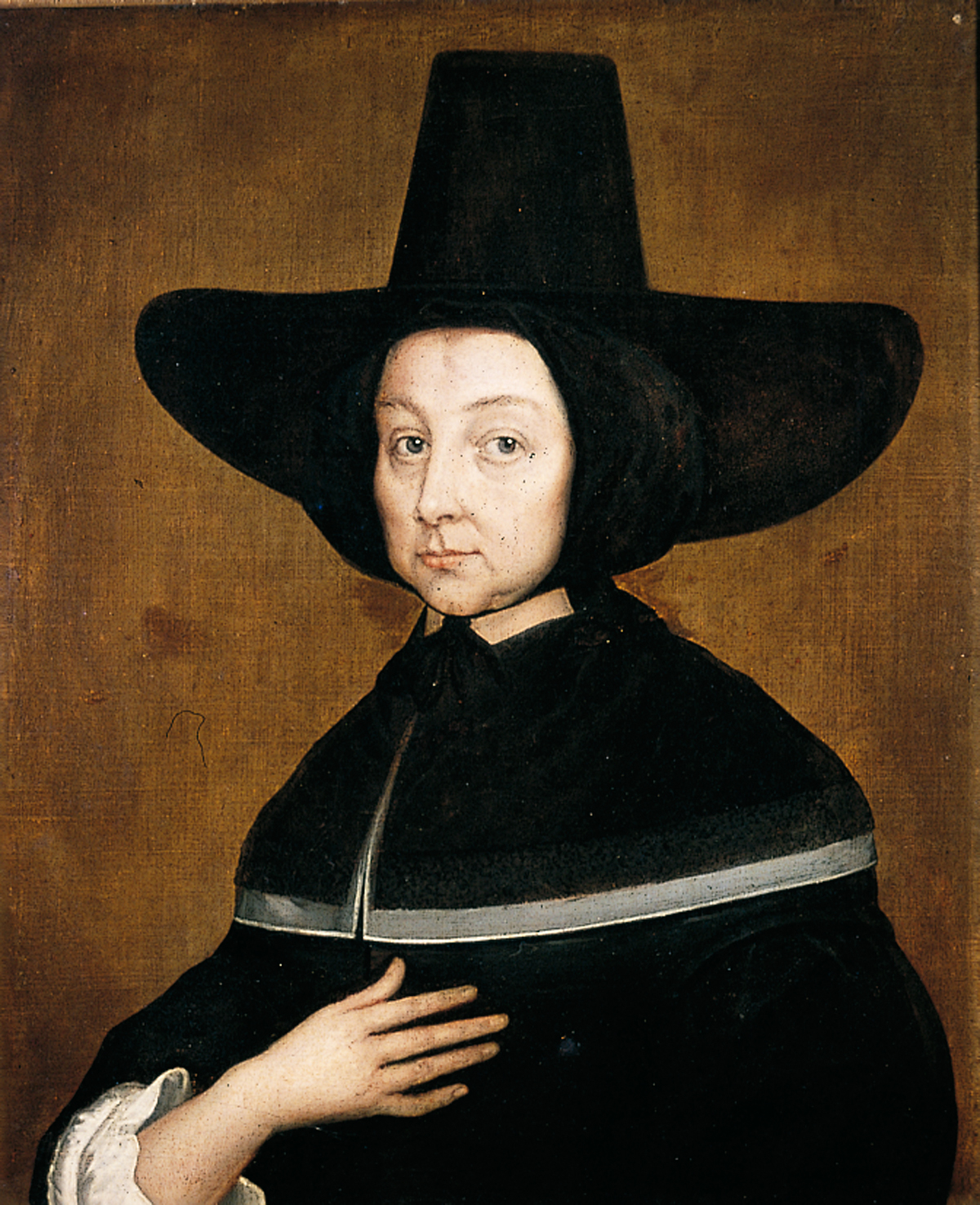
Katherine Lamplugh née Davenant

== Arms ==
Coat of arms of Thomas Lamplugh

Notes
While serving as a bishop Lamplugh's arms would be displayed impaled with the arms of the diocese and topped by a mitre.
Escutcheon
Or a cross flory Sable.

== Notes ==
Church of England titles
Preceded by Anthony Sparrow	Bishop of Exeter; 1676–1688	Succeeded by Sir Jonathan Trelawny
Vacant Title last held by John Dolben	Archbishop of York; 1688–1691	Succeeded by John Sharp
