= Wold Newton Cricket Club =

Cricket club in England

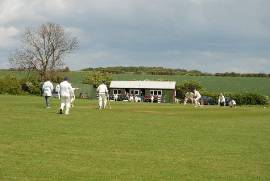
- Wold Newton Cricket Club (2010)
- League: Scarborough Beckett Cricket League

Team information
- Founded: 1870
- Home ground: Rudston Playing Field
- Official website: Wold Newton Cricket Club

Wold Newton Cricket Club represent and play in the village of Wold Newton in the East Riding of Yorkshire, England. Their ground is located off Laking Lane, heading out of the village towards Burton Fleming. Currently the first team plays in Division 2 of the Scarborough Beckett Cricket League,

== History ==
Wold Newton is one of only two villages in the Great Wold Valley to still have a cricket team, the other being Rudston Cricket Club.

=== Former grounds ===
Before moving to their present location, Wold Newton have played on a ground off Thwing Road and even earlier on the opposite side of Laking Lane.
