= Wold Newton, East Riding of Yorkshire =

Village and civil parish in the East Riding of Yorkshire, England

Coordinates: 54.142588°N 0.399420°W

Wold Newton
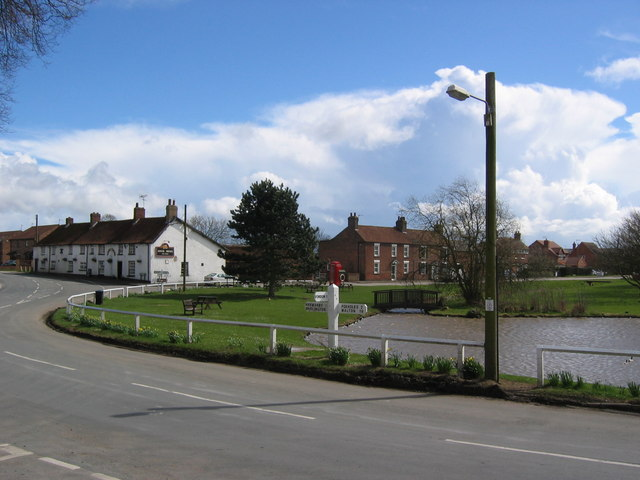
- View of village

- Location within the East Riding of Yorkshire
- Population: 337 (2011 census)
- OS grid reference: TA046730
- Civil parish: Wold Newton
- Unitary authority: East Riding of Yorkshire
- Ceremonial county: East Riding of Yorkshire
- Region: Yorkshire and the Humber
- Country: England
- Sovereign state: United Kingdom
- Post town: DRIFFIELD
- Postcode district: YO25
- Dialling code: 01262
- Police: Humberside
- Fire: Humberside
- Ambulance: Yorkshire
- UK Parliament: Bridlington and The Wolds

Wold Newton is a small Yorkshire Wolds village and civil parish in the East Riding of Yorkshire, England. It is situated approximately 9 miles (14 km) south of Scarborough and 9 miles (14 km) north-west of Bridlington. Wold Newton is located within the Great Wold Valley. The course of the Gypsey Race, a winterbourne chalk stream, passes through the south of the village. The village of Fordon is also part of the civil parish of Wold Newton. According to the 2011 UK census, Wold Newton parish had a population of 337, an increase on the 2001 UK census figure of 291.

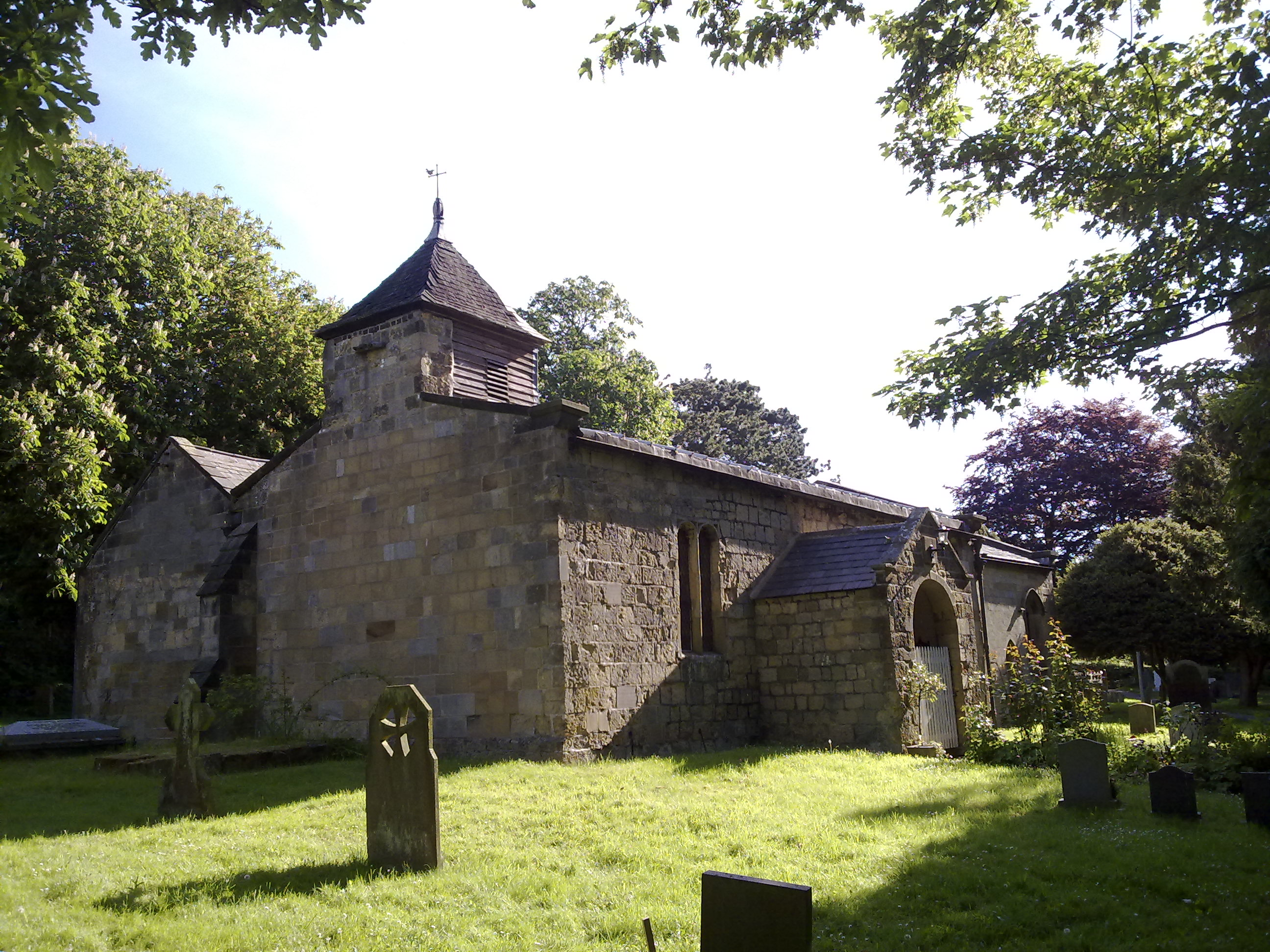
All Saints Church

The parish church of All Saints is a Grade II* listed building. Eight additional Grade II listed buildings include Wold Newton Hall, the former Wesleyan Chapel (now Wold Newton Community Centre), the Old Vicarage, the Anvil Arms Public House, and the Red telephone box on Wold Newton Green. Approximately two thirds of the village falls within the Wold Newton Conservation area.

Wold Newton has a small, fully automated telephone exchange. Rather confusingly, this is referred to as the "Thwing Exchange". (Thwing is a neighbouring village). Wold Newton Cricket Club have a ground off Laking Lane and field a first and second team.

The children's author Christina Butler lived for many years in the western section of Wold Newton Hall. Between 1988 and 2005 she wrote thirteen books, including Stanley in the Dark and Archie the Ugly Dinosaur.

== History ==
=== Neolithic round barrow ===
To the south of the village, close to the Gypsy Race, stands a Neolithic round barrow. It was excavated in 1894 by John Robert Mortimer. His team discovered that the monument had initially composed a large timber structure onto which several bodies had been laid along with pottery and flints. The Great Wold Valley was a site of considerable neolithic activity, also containing the barrows of Duggleby Howe and Willy Howe as well as the Rudston Monolith. The barrow has been a Scheduled Ancient Monument since 1962.

=== Bronze Age bowl barrows ===
Two bowl barrows are located to the west of Wold Newton Green. Both were used during mediaeval times as archery target butts, lending their name to the adjacent Butt Lane. They are now Scheduled Ancient Monuments.

=== Wold Newton hoard ===
In 2014 the metal detectorist David Blakely discovered a pottery container holding 1857 copper coins dating from the early 4th century AD. The container and coins were acquired by the Yorkshire Museum in 2016 and went on public display in 2017.

=== Origins of village ===
Wold Newton is an Anglian name denoting a new farmstead.

=== Enclosure ===
The land around Warrington was enclosed in 1776. The current channel of the Gypsy Race was defined at this time.

=== Wold Cottage meteorite ===
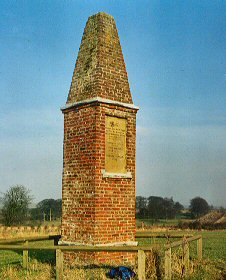
The Wold Newton meteorite monument

On 13 December 1795 a meteorite crashed on the outskirts of the village, landing within metres of ploughman John Shipley. As a monument to this event, there is a brick column bearing the inscription below. The meteorite is now housed in the Natural History Museum in London. The event inspired the development of the body of science fiction literature known as the Wold Newton family by American author Philip José Farmer.

Inscription
Here
On this Spot, Dec^{r}. 13^{th}, 1795
Fell from the Atmoſphere
AN EXTRAORDINARY STONE
In Breadth 28 inches
In Length 36 inches
and
Whoſe Weight was 56 pounds.
THIS COLUMN
In Memory of it
Was erected by
EDWARD TOPHAM
1799

=== Administrative history ===
From the mediaeval era until the 19th century, Wold Newton was part of Dickering Wapentake.

Between 1894 and 1974, Wold Newton was a part of the Bridlington Rural District, in the East Riding of Yorkshire. Between 1974 and 1996, it was part of the Borough of North Wolds (later Borough of East Yorkshire), in the county of Humberside.

Following the 1974 reforms to local government, the parish formed the northernmost tip of the new county of Humberside. The southern tip comprised the village of Wold Newton, Lincolnshire in Lincolnshire. Since 1996 Wold Newton is covered by the unitary East Riding of Yorkshire Council.

== See also ==
- Listed buildings in Wold Newton, East Riding of Yorkshire
