= Doc Savage: His Apocalyptic Life =

1973 fictional biography by Philip José Farmer

- First edition
- Author: Philip José Farmer
- Cover artist: Walter Baumhofer
- Language: English
- Series: Doc Savage
- Genre: Science fiction novel
- Publisher: Doubleday
- Publication date: 1973
- Publication place: United States
- Media type: Print (Hardback & Paperback)
- Pages: 226pp
- ISBN: 0-385-08488-9

Doc Savage: His Apocalyptic Life is a fictional biography by Philip José Farmer about pulp fiction hero Doc Savage.

The book is written with the assumption that Doc Savage was a real person. Kenneth Robeson, the author of the Doc Savage novels, is portrayed as writing fictionalized memoirs of the real Savage's life. Farmer examines the psychological make up of Doc and his associates, based on close readings of the 181 novels. In an appendix, "The Fabulous Family Tree of Doc Savage", Farmer links Savage to dozens of other fictional characters as a member of the Wold Newton family.

== Editions ==
- 1973, Doubleday, hardcover
- 1975, Bantam, paperback (expanded)
- 1981, Playboy, paperback (expanded)
- 2013, Meteor House, hardcover (revised, expanded again)
- 2013, Altus Press, paperback (revised)
