= Philip José Farmer bibliography =

In a writing career spanning more than 60 years (1946–2008), American science fiction and fantasy author Philip José Farmer published almost 60 novels, over 100 short stories and novellas (many expanded or combined into novels), two "fictional biographies", and numerous essays, articles and ephemera in fan publications.

== Novel series ==
=== World of Tiers ===
==== Novels ====
1. The Maker of Universes (1965, ISBN 0-441-51627-0)
2. The Gates of Creation (1966, ISBN 0-312-85761-6)
3. A Private Cosmos (1968, ISBN 0-411-67953-8)
4. Behind the Walls of Terra (1970, ISBN 0-312-86377-2)
5. The Lavalite World (1977, ISBN 0-89968-401-7)
  Red Orc's Rage (1991, ISBN 0-8125-0890-4) series-related, but not in the main sequence.
6. More Than Fire (1993, ISBN 0-8125-1959-0)

==== Omnibuses ====
- The World of Tiers Volume One (SFBC, 1991, Vols 1–2)
- The World of Tiers Volume Two (SFBC, 1991, Vols 3–5)
- World of Tiers 1 (Sphere, 1986, Vols 1–3)
- World of Tiers 2 (Sphere, 1986, Vols 4–5)
- The World of Tiers (Tor, 1996, ISBN 0-312-85761-6, Vols 1–3)
- The World of Tiers, Volume Two (Tor, 1997, ISBN 0-312-86377-2, Vols 4–6)

=== Herald Childe ===
1. Image of the Beast (1968, ISBN 1-902197-24-0) an erotic novel.
2. Blown: or Sketches Among the Ruins of My Mind (1969, ISBN 0-586-06211-4) an erotic novel.
3. Traitor to the Living (1973, ISBN 0-345-23613-0) non-erotic novel featuring Herald Childe.

- Image of the Beast (Playboy, 1979) (omnibus edition of Image of the Beast and Blown)

=== Secrets of the Nine ===
Lord Grandrith (inspired by Tarzan) and Doc Caliban (inspired by Doc Savage) as half-brothers involved in a world-ruling conspiracy.

- A Feast Unknown (1969, ISBN 0-87216-586-8)
- Lord of the Trees / The Mad Goblin (1970, dos-a-dos Ace Double, ISBN 0-441-49252-5
- The Empire of the Nine (Sphere, 1988) Omnibus reprint of the Ace Double with The Mad Goblin retitled as Keepers of the Secrets.

=== Riverworld ===
("Shared Universe" Riverworld works by other authors not included.)

Novels

1. To Your Scattered Bodies Go (1971, ISBN 0-345-41967-7)
2. The Fabulous Riverboat (1971, ISBN 0-345-41968-5)
3. The Dark Design (1977, ISBN 0-345-41969-3)
4. The Magic Labyrinth (1980, ISBN 0-89370-258-7)
5. Gods of Riverworld (1983, ISBN 0-345-41971-5)
- River of Eternity (Riverworld variant) (1983, ISBN 0-932096-28-X)

Novelette

- "Riverworld" (1966; Worlds of Tomorrow, January issue)
  - Slightly expanded version included in "Down in the Black Gang" (1971) ISBN 0-451-04805-9
  - Expanded (final) version included in Riverworld and Other Stories (1979)

Short stories

- "Crossing the Dark River" (1992)
- "A Hole in Hell" (1992; as by "Dane Helstrom", but by Farmer)
- "Up the Bright River" (1993)
- "Coda" (1993)

=== Tarzan-related ===
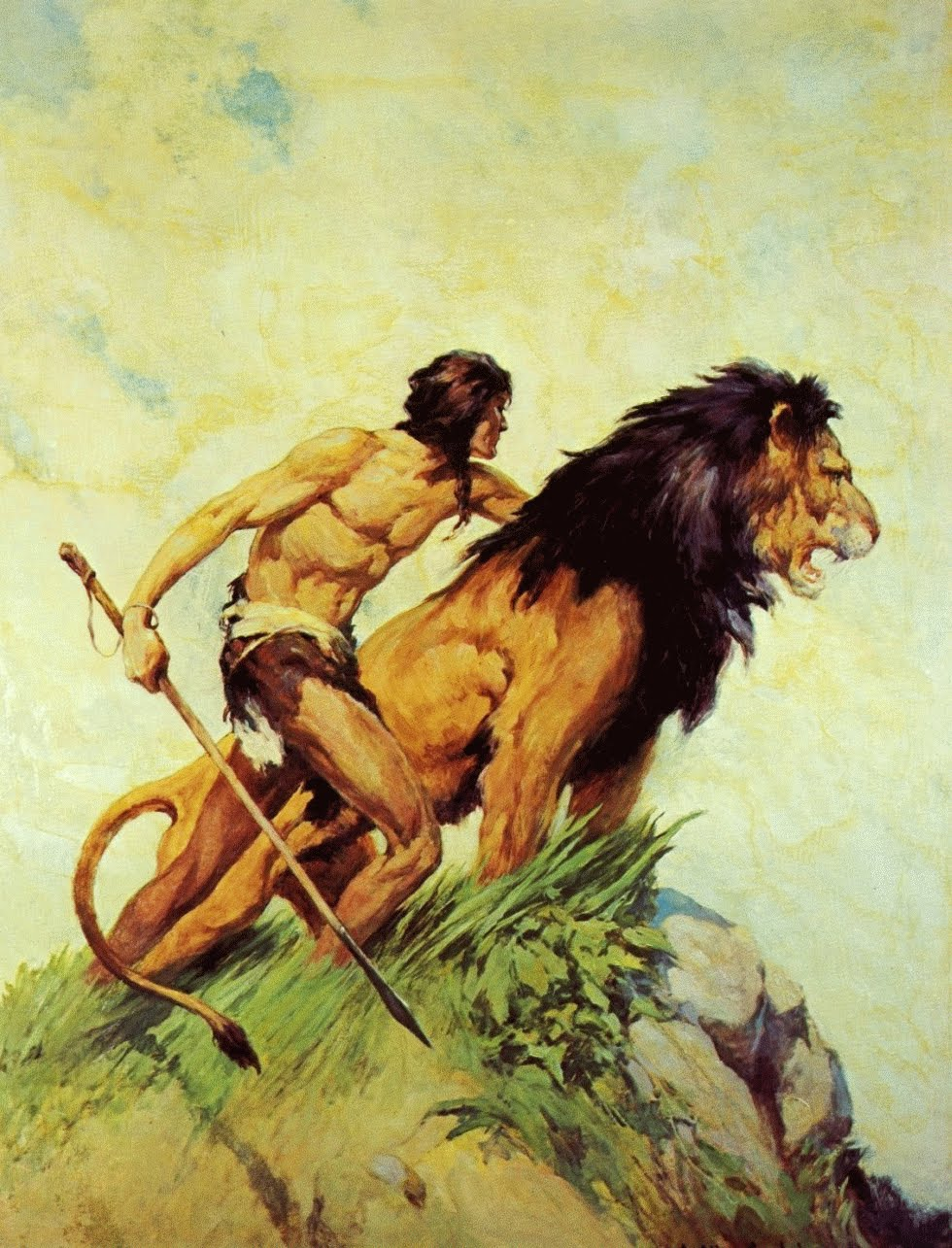
Tarzan

- Tarzan Alive: A Definitive Biography of Lord Greystoke (1972, ISBN 0-87216-876-X) A fictional biography which collects—and expands upon—magazine articles by Farmer: "The Arms of Tarzan" (1971), "Tarzan's Coat of Arms" (1971), "Tarzan Lives" (1972), "The Great Korak-Time Discrepancy" (1972), "An Exclusive Interview with Lord Greystoke" (1973 extract), "Extracts from the Memoirs of 'Lord Greystoke'" (1974 extract)
- Time's Last Gift (1972, ISBN 0-8125-1440-8) A novel in which a future Tarzan (using the name John Gribardsun) orchestrates time-travel research allowing him to travel to 12,000 BC.
- The Adventure of the Peerless Peer (1974, ISBN 0-915230-06-2) Tarzan meets Sherlock Holmes, as supposedly authored by John H. Watson.
  - Reissued by Titan Books in 2011 (ISBN 0-85768-120-6) as part of The Further Adventures of Sherlock Holmes series. It has the abbreviated title of The Peerless Peer.
  - Rewritten as "The Adventure of the Three Madmen"—with Mowgli replacing Tarzan—in The Grand Adventure collection (1984)
- The Dark Heart of Time: A Tarzan Novel (1999, ISBN 0-345-42463-8) Authorized by the ERB estate. The antagonist is an American millionaire seeking the secret of Tarzan's immortality.
  - Tarzan and the Dark Heart of Time (2018 hardcover reprint)

==== Khokarsa ====
The Khokarsa series, set circa 10,000 BC with the John Gribardsun version of Tarzan (from Time's Last Gift) as a supporting character using the name Sahhindar.

- Hadon of Ancient Opar (1974, ISBN 0-87997-637-3)
- Flight to Opar (1976, ISBN 0-87997-718-3)
- The Song of Kwasin (coauthored with Christopher Paul Carey), published in Gods of Opar: Tales of Lost Khokarsa omnibus (below).
- Gods of Opar: Tales of Lost Khokarsa, omnibus of Hadon of Ancient Opar, Flight to Opar, and The Song of Kwasin (2012) ISBN 978-1-59606-471-3.
- "Kwasin and the Bear God" (20,000-word novella coauthored with Christopher Paul Carey)

=== Doc Savage ===
- Doc Savage: His Apocalyptic Life (1973, ISBN 0-385-08488-9), a fictional biography
- Escape From Loki (1991, ISBN 0-553-29093-2), a novel

=== Dayworld ===
1. Dayworld (1985, ISBN 0-399-12967-7)
2. Dayworld Rebel (1987, ISBN 0-441-14002-5)
3. Dayworld Breakup (1990, ISBN 0-8125-0889-0)

== Other novels ==
- The Green Odyssey (1957) ISBN 1-4344-8494-7
- Flesh (1960) ISBN 0-85391-126-6 (expanded 1967, Doubleday)
- A Woman a Day (also as The Day of Timestop; 1960) ISBN 0-425-04526-9 (expanded from 1953 novella, Moth and Rust) (connected to The Lovers)
- The Lovers (1961) ISBN 0-345-28691-X (expanded from the 1952 novella) (revised 1977)
- Cache from Outer Space (1962)
- Fire and the Night (1962)
- Inside Outside (1964) ISBN 0-425-04041-0
- Tongues of the Moon (1964) ISBN 0-515-04595-0 (expanded from the 1961 novella)
- Dare (1965) ISBN 1-60010-438-X
- The Gate of Time (1966), revised and expanded as Two Hawks from Earth (1979) ISBN 0-7043-1171-2
- Night of Light (1966) ISBN 0-425-02249-8
- Lord Tyger (1970) ISBN 0-451-05096-7
- Love Song (1970)
- The Stone God Awakens (1970) ISBN 0-441-78654-5
- The Wind Whales of Ishmael (1971) ISBN 0-441-89240-X
- The Other Log of Phileas Fogg (1973) ISBN 0-8125-2468-3
- Venus on the Half-Shell (1975) (writing as Kilgore Trout) ISBN 0-440-36149-4
- Ironcastle (1976) (translation/expansion of work by J.-H. Rosny) ISBN 0-87997-545-8
- Jesus on Mars (1979) ISBN 0-523-40184-1
- Dark Is the Sun (1979) ISBN 0-345-33956-8
- The Unreasoning Mask (1981) ISBN 1-58567-715-9
- Stations of the Nightmare (1982) ISBN 0-8125-3773-4
- Greatheart Silver (1982) ISBN 0-523-48535-2
- A Barnstormer in Oz (1982) ISBN 0-425-06274-0
- Nothing Burns in Hell (1998) ISBN 0-312-86470-1
- Up From the Bottomless Pit, published in ten parts in Farmerphile: The Magazine of Philip José Farmer (2005–2007) ISBN 1-59606-128-6

Co-authored novels:

- The Caterpillar's Question (1992) (with Piers Anthony) ISBN 0-441-00213-7
- Naked Came The Farmer (1998) (with Nancy Atherton, Terry Bibo, Steven Burgauer, Dorothy Cannell, David Everson, Joseph Flynn, Julie Kistler, Jerry Klein, Bill Knight, Tracy Knight, Garry Moore and Joel Steinfeldt) ISBN 0-9624613-7-7
- The City Beyond Play, coauthored with Danny Adams (2007) ISBN 1-905834-24-1
- The Evil in Pemberley House, coauthored with Win Scott Eckert (2009), featuring the daughter of "Doc Savage" ISBN 1-59606-249-5
- Dayworld: A Hole in Wednesday, coauthored with Danny Adams (2016), Dayworld trilogy prequel ISBN 1-94542-701-9

== Story collections ==
- Strange Relations (1960) (collects "Mother", "Daughter", "Father", "Son", "My Sister's Brother") ISBN 1-4165-0934-8
- The Alley God (1962) ISBN 0-283-48417-9
- The Celestial Blueprint: And Other Stories (1962)
- Down in the Black Gang (1971) ISBN 0-451-04805-9
- The Book of Philip José Farmer, or the Wares of Simple Simon's Custard Pie and Space Man (1973) ISBN 0-86007-958-9
- Riverworld and Other Stories (1979) ISBN 0-425-06487-5
- Riverworld War: The Suppressed Fiction of Philip José Farmer (1980) (includes a condensed version of Jesus on Mars and several chapters cut from The Magic Labyrinth before publication)
- The Cache (1981) ISBN 0-8125-3755-6 (collection of Cache from Outer Space (1962) plus shorts)
- Father to the Stars (1981) ISBN 0-523-48504-2
- The Purple Book (1982) ISBN 0-523-48529-8
- The Classic Philip José Farmer, 1952–1964 (1984) (edited by Martin H Greenberg) ISBN 0-517-55193-4
- The Classic Philip José Farmer, 1964–1973 (1984) ISBN 0-517-55545-X
- The Grand Adventure (1984) (includes The Adventure of the Three Madmen) ISBN 0-425-07211-8
- Riders of the Purple Wage (1992) ISBN 0-8125-1905-1
- Myths for the Modern Age: Philip José Farmer's Wold Newton Universe (2005) (edited by Win Scott Eckert) ISBN 1-932265-14-7
- The Best of Philip José Farmer (2006) ISBN 1-59606-036-0
- Strange Relations (2006) (omnibus of The Lovers, Flesh, and the collection Strange Relations [1960]) ISBN 1-4165-5526-9
- Pearls from Peoria (2006) ISBN 1-59606-059-X
- Up from the Bottomless Pit and Other Stories (2007) ISBN 1-59606-128-6
- Venus on the Half-Shell and Others (2008) includes novels Venus on the Half-Shell and The Adventure of the Peerless Peer plus other stories written as by fictional characters ISBN 1-59606-142-1

Posthumous reprints

- The Other in the Mirror (2009) (omnibus of Fire & The Night, Jesus on Mars, Night of Light) ISBN 1-59606-231-2
- The Worlds of Philip José Farmer 1: Protean Dimensions (2010) ISBN 0-615-37005-5
- Up the Bright River (2010), ed. by Gary K. Wolfe. ISBN 1-59606-329-7
- The Worlds of Philip José Farmer 2: Of Dust and Soul (2011) ISBN 0-9837461-0-9
- The Worlds of Philip José Farmer 3: Portraits of a Trickster (2012) ISBN 0-9837461-1-7
- Tales of the Wold Newton Universe (2013) ISBN 1-78116-304-9

== Short fiction ==
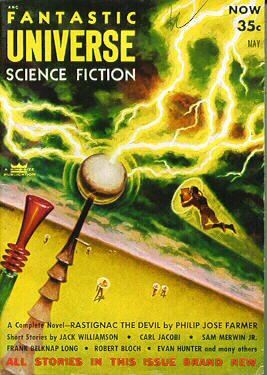
"Rastignac the Devil" was cover-featured on the March 1954 issue of Fantastic Universe

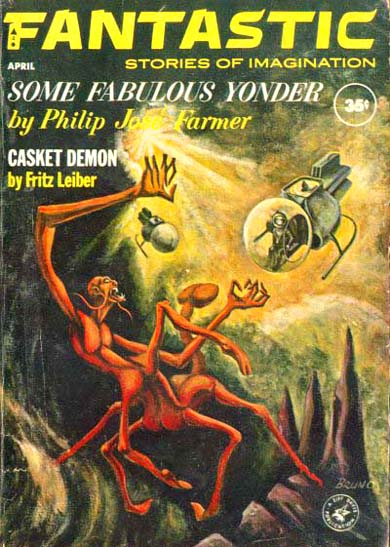
"Some Fabulous Yonder" was the cover story on the April 1963 issue of Fantastic

- "O'Brien and Obrenov" (1946)
- "Duo Miaule" (Ca. 1950s; Rediscovered/published 2008)
- The Lovers (1952) (expanded to novel of same name, 1961)
- "Sail On! Sail On!" (1952)
- "The Biological Revolt" (1953)
- "Mother" (1953)
- "Moth and Rust" (1953) (basis of novel, A Woman a Day (1960))
- "Attitudes" (1953)
- "Strange Compulsion" (1953)
- "They Twinkled Like Jewels" (1954)
- "Daughter" (1954)
- "Queen of the Deep" (1954)
- "The God Business" (1954)
- "Rastignac the Devil" (1954)
- "The Celestial Blueprint" (1954)
- "The Wounded" (1954)
- "Totem and Taboo" (1954)
- "Father" (1955)
- "The Green Odyssey" (1957)
- "The Night of Light" (1957)
- "The Alley Man" (1959)
- "Heel" (1960)
- "My Sister's Brother" or "Open to Me, My Sister" (1960)
- "A Few Miles" (1960)
- "Prometheus" (1961)
- "Tongues of the Moon" (1961) (expanded as novel of same name, 1964)
- "Uproar in Acheron" (1962)
- "How Deep the Grooves" (1963)
- "Some Fabulous Yonder" (1963)
- "The Blasphemers" (1964)
- "The King of the Beasts" (1964)
- "Day of the Great Shout" (1965)
- "Riverworld" (1966)
- "The Suicide Express" (1966)
- "The Blind Rowers" (1967)
- "A Bowl Bigger than Earth" (1967)
- "The Felled Star (part 1)" (1967)
- "The Felled Star (part 2)" (1967)
- "The Shadow of Space" (1967)
- "Riders of the Purple Wage" (1967)
- "Don't Wash the Carats" (1968)
- "The Jungle Rot Kid on the Nod" (1968)
- "Down in the Black Gang" (1969)
- "The Oogenesis of Bird City" (1970)
- "The Voice of the Sonar in my Vermiform Appendix" (1971)
- "Brass and Gold" (1971)
- "The Fabulous Riverboat (part 1)" (1971)
- "The Fabulous Riverboat (part 2)" (1971)
- "Only Who Can Make a Tree?" (1971)
- "The Sliced-Crosswise Only-On-Tuesday World" (1971) (basis of the Dayworld series of novels)
- "Seventy Years of Decpop" (1972)
- "Skinburn" (1972)
- "The Sumerian Oath" (1972)
- "Father's in the Basement" (1972)
- "Toward the Beloved City" (1972)
- "Mother Earth Wants You" (1972)
- "Sketches Among the Ruins of My Mind" (1973)
- "Monolog" (1973)
- "After King Kong Fell" (1973)
- "Opening the Door" (1973)
- "The Two-Edged Gift" (1974)
- "The Startouched" (1974)
- "The Evolution of Paul Eyre" (1974)
- "Passing On" (1975)
- "A Scarletin Study, as Jonathan Swift Somers III" (1975)
- "The Problem of the Sore Bridge - Among Others, as Harry Manders" (1975)
- "Greatheart Silver" (1975)
- "The Return of Greatheart Silver" (1975)
- "Osiris on Crutches, as Leo Queequeg Tincrowder" (1976)
- "The Volcano, as Paul Chapin" (1976)
- "The Doge Whose Barque Was Worse Than His Bight, as Jonathan Swift Somers III" (1976)
- "Fundamental Issue" (1976)
- "The Henry Miller Dawn Patrol" (1977)
- "Greatheart Silver in the First Command" (1977)
- "Savage Shadow as Maxwell Grant" (1977)
- "The Impotency of Bad Karma as Cordwainer Bird" (1977)
- "It's the Queen of Darkness, Pal, as Rod Keen" (1978)
- "Freshman" (1979)
- "The Leaser of Two Evils" (1979)
- "J.C. on the Dude Ranch" (1979)
- "Spiders of the Purple Mage" (1980)
- "The Making of Revelation, Part I" (1980)
- "The Long Wet Dream of Rip Van Winkle" (1981)
- "The Adventure of the Three Madmen" (1984) (rewrite of The Adventure of the Peerless Peer (1974))
- "UFO vs IRS" (1985)
- "St. Francis Kisses His Ass Goodbye" (1989)
- "One Down, One to Go" (1990)
- "Evil, Be My Good" (1990)
- "Nobody's Perfect" (1991)
- "Wolf, Iron and Moth" (1991)
- "Crossing the Dark River" (1992)
- "A Hole in Hell" (1992; as "Dane Helstrom")
- "Up the Bright River" (1993)
- "Coda" (1993)
- "The Good of the Land" (2002)
- "The Face that Launched a Thousand Eggs" (2005)
- "The Unnaturals" (2005)
- "Who Stole Stonehenge?" (2005)
- "That Great Spanish Author, Ernesto" (2006)
- "The Essence of the Poison" (2006)
- "The Doll Game" (2006)
- "Keep Your Mouth Shut" (2006)
- "The Frames" (2007)
- "A Spy in the U.S. of Gonococcia" (2007)
- "A Peoria Night" (2007)
- "The First Robot" (2008)
- "Getting Ready to Write" (2008) (co-authored with Paul Spiteri)
- "My Summer Husband" (2010)
- "What I Thought I Heard" (2011)
- "Kwasin and the Bear God" (2011) (co-authored with Christopher Paul Carey)

== Anthologies edited by Farmer ==
- Mother Was A Lovely Beast: A Feral Man Anthology, Fiction And Fact About Humans Raised By Animals (1974) ISBN 0-8019-5964-0
- Tales of Riverworld (1992) ISBN 0-446-36269-7
- Quest to Riverworld (1993) with uncredited co-editors Richard Gilliam, Martin H. Greenberg, and Edward E. Kramer ISBN 0-446-36270-0

== Ephemera ==
- "Bradley Brave Sees New York With Observing Injun Eyes—And with Knocking Knees" (1940)
- "Lovers and Otherwise" (1953)
- "The Tin Woodman Slams the Door" (1954)
- "White Whales Raintrees Flying Saucers" (1954)
- "The Golden Age and the Brass" (1956)
- "On a Mountain Upside Down" (1960)
- "Blueprint for Free Beer" (1967)
- "Reap" (1968)
- "Oft Have I Travelled" (1969)
- "Report" (1969) - republished as "The Josés from Rio" (2006)
- "The Affair of the Logical Lunatics" (1971)
- "The Two Lord Ruftons" (1971)
- "The Obscure Life and Hard Times of Kilgore Trout" (1971; revised 1982)
- "A Reply to "The Red Herring"" (1971)
- "The Lord Mountford Mystery" (1972)
- "Writing the Biography of Doc Savage" (1973) - republished as "Writing Doc's Biography" (1974)
- "From Erb to Ygg" (1973)
- "To the Wizard of Sci-Fi" (1974)
- "The Feral Human in Mythology and Fiction" (1974)
- "Charles L. Tanner" (1974)
- "A Language for Opar" (1974)
- "Some Comments" (1975) - republished as "The Source of the River" (2006)
- "How Dinosaurs Did It" (1976)
- "Phonemics" (1976)
- "Philip Jose Farmer Sez ..." (1976) - republished as "A Fimbulwinter Introduction" (2006)
- "Religion and Myths" (1977)
- "Jonathan Swift Somers III: Cosmic Traveller in a Wheelchair" (1977)
- "The Remarkable Adventure" with Beverly Friend (1978)
- "Creating Artificial Worlds" (1979)
- "Riverworld War" (1980)
- "Maps and Spasms" (1981)
- "The Monster on Hold" (1983)
- "L. Frank Baum" (1985)
- "Edgar Rice Burroughs" (1985)
- "Memoir" (1986) - republished as "IF R.I.P" (2006)
- "Remembering VERN" (1987)
- "The Journey" (1988)
- "Hayy ibn Yaqzam: An Arabic Mowgli" (1994)
- "Robert Bloch: An Appreciation" (1994)
- "Dede Weil: An Appreciation" (2000)
- "I Still Live!" (2006)
- "Why Do I Write?" (2006)
- "The Trout Letters" (2006)
- "The Light-Hog Incident" (2007)
- "The Rebels Unthawed" (2007)
- "A Modest Proposal" (2007)
- "Sherlock Holmes & Sufism—& Related Subjects" (2008)
- "Jongor in the Wold Newton Family" (2008)
- "Three Metafictional Proposals" (2008)
- "Uncle Sam's Mad Tea Party" (2008)
- "Down to Earth's Centre" (2008)
- "The Weird Wild Climb" (2008)
- "Buddha Contemplates His Novel" (2009)
- "Resumé of Riverworld Dawn" (2009)
- "Miadzian Journal" (2009)
- "Time Has Its Mirages" (2009)
- "Newly Born, Newly Dead" (2010)
- "The Legend of Mishiwapo" (2010)
- "A Writer's Prayer" (2010)
- "Strangers & Brothers: Pitch to Publishers" (2011)
- "Strangers & Brothers: Francis Uquart" (2011)
- "A Slender Tribute to a Big Man" (2011)
- "Faith in 2097" (2011)
- "Mark Twain and Kurt Vonnegut versus Free Will" (2011)
