= The Dark Heart of Time =

Tarzan novel by Philip José Farmer

The Dark Heart of Time: a Tarzan Novel
- Author: Philip José Farmer
- Original title: Tarzan's Greatest Secret
- Language: English
- Series: Tarzan series
- Genre: Adventure
- Publisher: Del Rey
- Publication date: 1999 (paperback); 2018 (hardcover); 2018 (trade paperback)
- Publication place: United States
- Media type: Print (paperback)
- Pages: 278
- ISBN: 0-345-42463-8
- Preceded by: Tarzan: The Epic Adventures (1996)
- Followed by: The Adventures of Tarzan (2006)

The Dark Heart of Time: A Tarzan novel is a novel by American writer Philip José Farmer, authorized by Edgar Rice Burroughs, Inc. Published in 1999, the book was first announced under the title Tarzan's Greatest Secret in 1997. A 2018 reissue of the novel marked the book's first hardcover edition, and was retitled Tarzan and the Dark Heart of Time.

== Plot ==
Set in October 1918—during Tarzan's search for Jane—the novel takes place between Tarzan the Untamed and Tarzan the Terrible.

The novel's antagonist is James D. Stonecraft, an American oil magnate who believes that Tarzan knows the secret of immortality. Stonecraft hires hunters to track and capture Tarzan for the secret, leading to conflicts at the "City Built by God" and the "Crystal Tree of Time". Through all of the adventure Tarzan is focused on escaping his pursuers so that he may return to his search for his wife.

== Other Tarzan stories by Farmer ==
Before The Dark Heart of Time, Philip José Farmer wrote a number of books based to some extent on Tarzan.

- Time's Last Gift (1972) being a time travel story, the novel is both an unauthorized sequel to the entire Tarzan series, and a prequel to the authorized Khokarsa series.
- Tarzan Alive: A Definitive Biography of Lord Greystoke (1972/2006)
- The Adventure of the Peerless Peer (1974) an unauthorized work in which Tarzan meets Sherlock Holmes.
- Khokarsa series, novels authorized by ERB, Inc. set in Tarzan's Africa 10,000 years ago.
  - Hadon of Ancient Opar (1974)
  - Flight to Opar (1976)
- The Secrets of the Nine series, an alternative interpretation of Tarzan and Doc Savage as half-brothers battling a world-wide conspiracy headed by a group known as The Nine.
  - A Feast Unknown (1969) ISBN 0-87216-586-8
  - Lord of the Trees / The Mad Goblin (dos-a-dos Ace Double, 1970) ISBN 0-441-49252-5
  - The Empire of the Nine (Sphere, 1988) Omnibus reprint of the Ace Double with The Mad Goblin retitled as Keepers of the Secrets.

Preceded by Tarzan: The Epic Adventures	Tarzan series The Dark Heart of Time	Succeeded by The Adventures of Tarzan
