= Venus on the Half-Shell and Others =

2008 collection by Philip José Farmer

- Editor: Christopher Paul Carey
- Author: Philip José Farmer
- Cover artist: Bob Eggleton
- Language: English
- Genre: Science fiction
- Publisher: Subterranean Press
- Publication date: 2008
- Publication place: United States
- Media type: Print (hardcover)
- Pages: 325 pp
- ISBN: 978-1-59606-142-2
- OCLC: 192074536

Venus on the Half-Shell and Others (ISBN 978-1-59606-128-6) is a collection mostly of science fiction author Philip José Farmer's pseudonymous fictional-author literary works, edited by Christopher Paul Carey and published in 2008. Farmer describes a fictional-author story as "a tale supposedly written by an author who is a character in fiction." Carey, who had access to Farmer's correspondence while editing the book, reveals in his introduction that in the early to mid-1970s Farmer planned to edit an anthology of fictional-author stories by other writers. Farmer solicited fictional-author stories from authors such as Arthur Jean Cox, Philip K. Dick, Leslie Fiedler, Ron Goulart, Howard Waldrop, and Gene Wolfe, urging them to submit their stories to venues such as The Magazine of Fantasy and Science Fiction. Only Cox, Waldrop, and Wolfe completed their stories and had them published, although Philip K. Dick's never realized fictional-author story "A Man for No Countries" as by Hawthorne Abendsen is said to have led Dick to write his posthumous novel Radio Free Albemuth. In the end, Farmer's fictional-author anthology never materialized.

== The Tom Wode Bellman Conundrum ==
The Foreword by Tom Wode Bellman in Venus on the Half-Shell and Others states that Bellman was also solicited by Farmer to write a fictional-author story entitled "The Wee Weepers of Mu" as by Gabriel Weltstein, which was reputedly published in 1976 in a fanzine called Kukuanafan, although there has been some debate as to whether the name Tom Wode Bellman is itself a fictional-author pseudonym. The July 2008 issue of Farmerphile: The Magazine of Philip José Farmer published a Guest of Honor speech which Farmer presented at the science fiction convention Balticon 11 that only adds to the Bellman mystery. In the speech, Farmer states that he planned to write a novel about the science fiction community featuring a protagonist named Tom Wode Bellman. However, an essay accompanying the speech, purportedly by Bellman, claims that Farmer merely used Bellman's name for the character as a joke.

== Contents ==
- "Foreword" by Tom Wode Bellman
- "Introduction: More Real Than Life Itself: Philip José Farmer's Fictional-Author Period" by Christopher Paul Carey
- "Why and How I Became Kilgore Trout"
- Venus on the Half-Shell (a novel originally published under the byline Kilgore Trout)
- "The Obscure Life and Times of Kilgore Trout"
- "The Jungle Rot Kid on the Nod"
- "The Problem of the Sore Bridge--Among Others" as by Harry Manders
- "The Volcano" (originally published under the byline Paul Chapin)
- "Osiris on Crutches" as by Leo Queequeg Tincrowdor
- "The Phantom of the Sewers" (originally published as "It's the Queen of Darkness, Pal" by Rod Keen)
- "A Hole in Hell" as by Dane Helstrom
- "The Last Rise of Nick Adams" (originally published as "The Impotency of Bad Karma" under the byline Cordwainer Bird)
- The Adventure of the Peerless Peer as by John H. Watson
- "Philip José Farmer as Fictional Author: A Chronological Bibliography"
- "The Impotency of Bad Karma" (only available in the Lettered leatherbound edition)
