= Sex and sexuality in speculative fiction =

Sexual themes are frequently used in science fiction or related genres. Such elements may include depictions of realistic sexual interactions in a science fictional setting, a protagonist with an alternative sexuality, a sexual encounter between a human and a fictional extraterrestrial, or exploration of the varieties of sexual experience that deviate from the conventional.

Science fiction and fantasy have sometimes been more constrained than non-genre narrative forms in their depictions of sexuality and gender. However, speculative fiction (SF) and soft science fiction also offer the freedom to imagine alien or galactic societies different from real-life cultures, making it a tool to examine sexual bias, heteronormativity, and gender bias and enabling the reader to reconsider their cultural assumptions.

Prior to the 1960s, explicit sexuality of any kind was not characteristic of genre speculative fiction due to the relatively high number of minors in the target audience. In the 1960s, science fiction and fantasy began to reflect the changes prompted by the civil rights movement and the emergence of a counterculture. New Wave and feminist science fiction authors imagined cultures in which a variety of gender models and atypical sexual relationships are the norm, and depictions of sex acts and alternative sexualities became commonplace.

There is also science fiction erotica, which explores more explicit sexuality and the presentation of themes aimed at inducing arousal.

== Critical analysis ==
As genres of popular literature, science fiction and fantasy often seem even more constrained than non-genre literature by their conventions of characterization and the effects that these conventions have on depictions of sexuality and gender. Sex is often linked to disgust in science fiction and horror, and plots based on sexual relationships have mainly been avoided in genre fantasy narratives. On the other hand, science fiction and fantasy can also offer more freedom than do non-genre literatures to imagine alternatives to the default assumptions of heterosexuality and masculine superiority that permeate some cultures.

In speculative fiction, extrapolation allows writers to focus not on the way things are (or were), as non-genre literature does, but on the way things could be different. It provides science fiction with a quality that Darko Suvin has called "cognitive estrangement": the recognition that what we are reading is not the world as we know it, but a world whose difference forces us to reconsider our own world with an outsider's perspective. When the extrapolation involves sexuality or gender, it can force the reader to reconsider their heteronormative cultural assumptions; the freedom to imagine societies different from real-life cultures makes science fiction an incisive tool to examine sexual bias. In science fiction, such estranging features include technologies that significantly alter sex or reproduction. In fantasy, such features include figures (for example, mythological deities and heroic archetypes) who are not limited by preconceptions of human sexuality and gender, allowing them to be reinterpreted. Science fiction has also depicted a plethora of alien methods of reproduction and sex.

Uranian Worlds, by Eric Garber and Lyn Paleo, is an authoritative guide to science fiction literature featuring gay, lesbian, transgender, and related themes. The book covers science fiction literature published before 1990 (2nd edition), providing a short review and commentary on each piece.

=== Themes explored ===
Some of the themes explored in speculative fiction include:

- Sex with aliens, machines and sex robots
- Reproductive technology including cloning, artificial wombs, parthenogenesis, and genetic engineering
- Sexual equality of men and women
- Male- and female-dominated societies, including single-gender worlds
- Polyamory
- Changing gender roles
- Homosexuality and bisexuality
- Androgyny and sex changes
- Sex in virtual reality
- Other advances in technology for sexual pleasure such as teledildonics
- Asexuality
- Mpreg, an abbreviation of male pregnancy
- Sexual taboos and morality
- Sex in zero gravity
- Birth control and other, more radical measures to prevent overpopulation

=== Scholarly Approaches ===
Academic analysis of sexuality in speculative fiction often draws on frameworks from queer theory, feminist theory, and posthumanism. Scholars have used these approaches to examine how speculative narratives challenge or reproduce norms surrounding gender, embodiment, and desire. For example, theorists such as Judith Butler and Eve Kosofsky Sedgwick have influenced readings of speculative fiction that emphasize the constructed and performative nature of gender and sexuality, while the work of Michel Foucault has informed analyses of how sexual norms are shaped by discourse and power.

In addition, scholarship in science and technology studies and posthumanism, including Donna Haraway's concept of the cyborg, has been used to explore representations of artificial reproduction, non-human bodies, and technologically mediated intimacy. Studies such as Queer Universes: Sexualities in Science Fiction (2008), edited by Wendy Gay Pearson, Veronica Hollinger, and Joan Gordon, and Bodies of Tomorrow (2007) examine how speculative fiction engages with questions of embodiment, identity, and biopolitics.

Scholars have also emphasized the importance of historical and cultural context, noting that depictions of sexuality in speculative fiction often reflect broader social debates, including feminist movements, LGBTQ+ rights, and changing attitudes toward reproduction and family structures. More recent research expands the field beyond Anglophone literature to include global and intersectional perspectives, as well as analyses of film, television, and fan cultures.

== SF literature ==
=== Proto SF ===
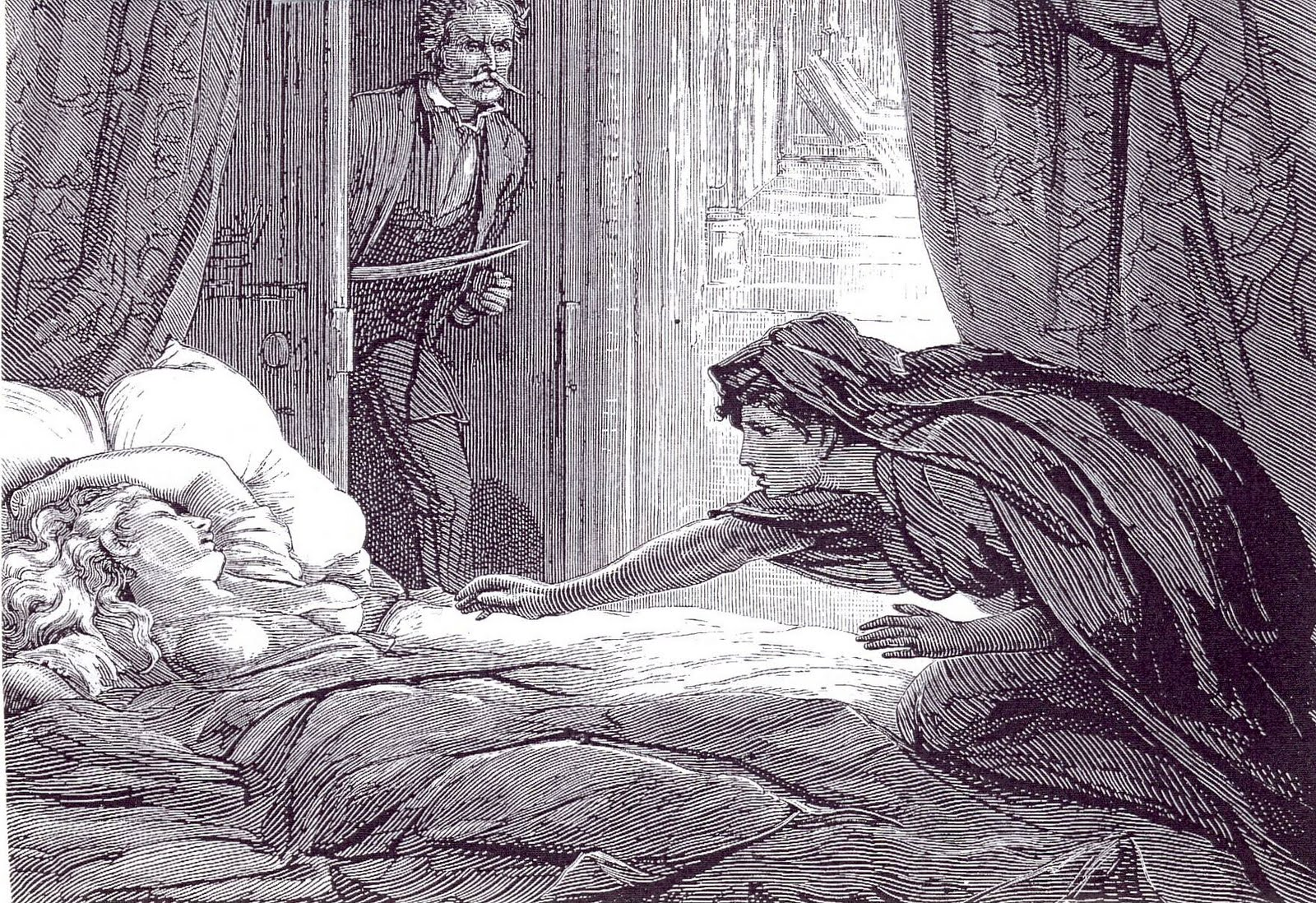
Illustration by D. H. Friston that accompanied the first publication of lesbian vampire novella Carmilla in The Dark Blue magazine in 1872

True History, a Greek-language tale by Assyrian writer Lucian (120-185 CE), has been called the first ever science fiction story. (Note: Georgiadou, Aristoula & Larmour, David H.J in their introduction: "...Lucian's Verae Historiae ("True Histories"), a fantastic journey narrative considered the earliest surviving example of Science Fiction in the Western tradition.") (Note: Gunn, James E. denotes True History as "Proto-Science Fiction", p.249) The narrator is suddenly enveloped by a typhoon and swept up to the Moon, which is inhabited by a society of men who are at war with the Sun. After the hero distinguishes himself in combat, the king gives him his son, the prince, in marriage. The all-male society reproduces (male children only) by giving birth from the thigh or by growing a child from a plant produced by planting the left testicle in the Moon's soil.

In other proto-SF works, sex itself, of any type, was equated with base desires or "beastliness," as in Gulliver's Travels (1726), which contrasts the animalistic and overtly sexual Yahoos with the reserved and intelligent Houyhnhnms. Early works that showed sexually open characters to be morally impure include the first lesbian vampire story "Carmilla" (1872) by Sheridan Le Fanu (collected in In a Glass Darkly).

The 1915 utopian novel Herland by Charlotte Perkins Gilman depicts the visit by three men to an all-female society in which women reproduce by parthenogenesis.

=== Pulp era (1920–30s) ===
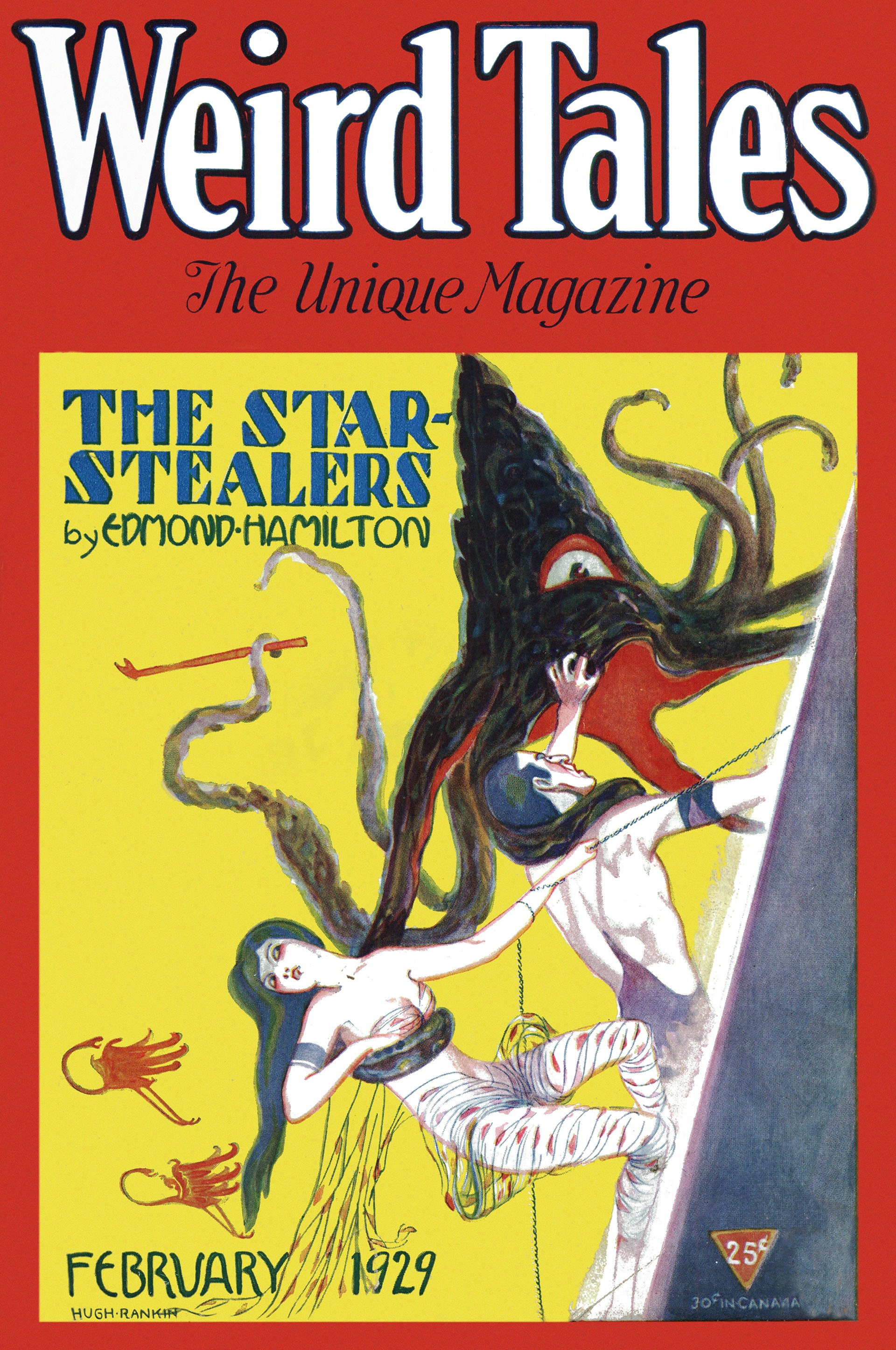
The cover of Weird Tales in February 1929 depicts a scantily-clad young woman.

During the pulp era, explicit sexuality of any kind was not characteristic of genre science fiction and fantasy. The frank treatment of sexual topics of earlier literature was abandoned. For many years, the editors who controlled what was published, such as Kay Tarrant, assistant editor of Astounding Science Fiction, felt that they had to protect the adolescent male readership that they identified as their principal market. Although the covers of some 1930s pulp magazines showed scantily clad women menaced by tentacled aliens, the covers were often more lurid than the magazines' contents. Implied or disguised sexuality was as important as that which was openly revealed. In this sense, genre science fiction reflected the social mores of the day, paralleling common prejudices. This was particularly true of pulp fiction, more so than literary works of the time.

H. P. Lovecraft seminal short story, "The Call of Cthulhu", first published in the pulp magazine Weird Tales in 1928, launched what developed into the Cthulhu Mythos, a shared fictional universe taken up by various other writers and considerably affecting the entire field of Fantasy. Bobby Derie's 2014 book Sex and The Cthulhu Mythos treats extensively the various sexual aspects of this Mythos:

"H. P. Lovecraft was one of the most asexual beings in history - at least by his own admission. Whether we accept this view of his own sexual instincts or not, there is no denying that sexuality - normal and aberrant - underlies a number of significant tales in the Lovecraft oeuvre. The impregnation of a human woman by Yog-Sothoth in "The Dunwich Horror" and the mating of humans with strange creatures from the sea in "The Shadow over Innsmouth" are only two such examples."

Sex and The Cthulhu Mythos examines the significant uses of love, gender, and sex in the work of H. P. Lovecraft, moving on to some of his leading disciples and noting that "The work of such significant writers of the Lovecraft tradition as Robert E. Howard, Clark Ashton Smith, Ramsey Campbell, W. H. Pugmire, and Caitlín R. Kiernan, features far more explicit sexuality than anything Lovecraft could have imagined". Finally, Derie goes on to study sexual themes in other venues, such as Lovecraftian occultism, Japanese manga and anime, and even Lovecraftian fan fiction.

In Aldous Huxley's dystopian novel Brave New World (1932), natural reproduction has been abolished, with human embryos being raised artificially in "hatcheries and conditioning centres." Recreational sex is promoted, often as a group activity; what passes for a religious ceremony consists of six men and six women meeting once a week to hold an "orgy porgy". To prepare for this life, little boys and girls are made to play sexual games with each other as part of the official curriculum in what passes for kindergartens and elementary schools. On the other hand, marriage, pregnancy, natural birth, and parenthood are considered too vulgar to be mentioned in polite conversation. An important part of the plot concerns the Savage Reservation in New Mexico, where marriage, pregnancy and motherhood are still practiced by the local Native Americans. Linda, a woman from 'civilized' London who was marooned there and sticking to her accustomed sexual mores, is persecuted as "a whore" by the local women whose husbands she seduced. John, Linda's son who grew up on the Reservation but was always alienated from its society, comes to London and there falls deeply in love with a girl - seeking a happy loving consummation with her and then violently assaulting her from jealousy when she behaves according to her society's sexual mores.

One of the earliest examples of genre science fiction that involves a challenging amount of unconventional sexual activity is Odd John (1935) by Olaf Stapledon. John is a mutant with extraordinary mental abilities who will not allow himself to be bound by many of the rules imposed by the ordinary British society of his time. The novel strongly implies that he has consensual intercourse with his mother and that he seduces an older boy who becomes devoted to him but also suffers from the affront that the relationship creates to his own morals. John eventually concludes that any sexual interaction with "normal" humans is akin to bestiality.

War with the Newts, a 1936 satirical science fiction novel by Czech author Karel Čapek, concerns the discovery in the Pacific of a sea-dwelling race, an intelligent breed of newts – who are initially enslaved and exploited by humans and later rebel and go war against them. The book includes a detailed appendix entitled 'The Sex Life of the Newts', which examines the Newts' sexuality and reproductive processes in a pastiche of academese. This is one of the first attempts to speculate on what form sex might have among non-human intelligent beings.

C.L. Moore's 1934 story "Shambleau" begins in what seems a classical damsel in distress situation: the protagonist, space adventurer Northwest Smith, sees a "sweetly-made girl" pursued by a lynch mob intent on killing her and intervenes to save her. But once he takes her to his room, she turns to be a disguised alien creature who spreads her inhuman long tendrils of hair, trapping Smith in a kind of psychic bondage and drawing out his life, and but for his partner arriving and killing her, it would have ended with his death. The story has little explicit sex, and no other physical contact than that of the hair of the "girl" with Smith's body; yet the story clearly explores sexual themes in a way highly daring for its time.

In C.S. Lewis's That Hideous Strength, a prominent place is given among the cast of villains to a monstrous lesbian – Miss Hardcastle, Security Chief of the satanic "Institute" which quite literally intends to take over the world. Hardcastle is presented as an inveterate sadist who takes pleasure in torturing "fluffy" young women and inflicting on them burns with a lighted cigarette.

=== Golden Age (1940–50s) ===
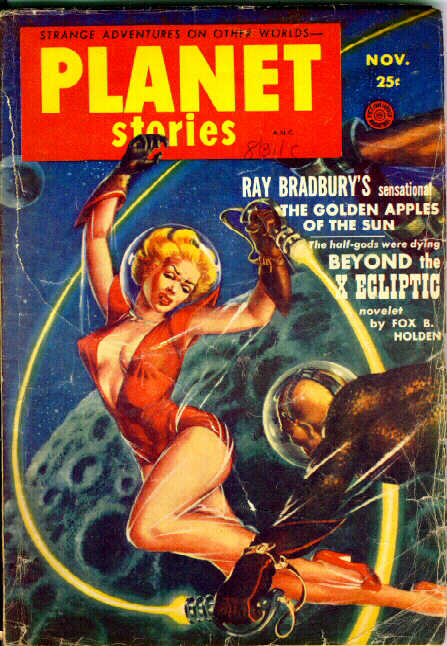
The cover of Planet Stories (1953) depicts a female astronaut who looks like a voluptuous pin-up.

Regarding the aversion to sexual material in science fiction magazines well into the 1950s, Sam Moskowitz reported:

Writing in the December, 1945, Fantasy Times, Thomas S. Gardner, Ph.D., said: “Sex should be incorporated into science fiction as a standard life pattern and treated from all phases just as political systems are discussed.... But just mention sex and one has not only a figurative fight but a literal fight on his hands. Sex is very, very tabu, and can cause the most violent disagreements possible. Just why that is so is hard to understand.” G. Legman, erotica authority, presented his theory. “The reason for this [aversion to sex] is neither due to oversight nor external censorship, but the fact that the largest percentage of the audience for … pulp science fiction literature is composed of adolescent boys (who continue reading it even after they are grown up), who are terrified of women, sex, and pubic hair.” The foregoing might explain the policy that kept sex out of science fiction, but it fails to explain the absolute rejection of such material until Philip José Farmer’s The Lovers. The answer most probably is that science fiction is a literature of ideas. The people who read it are entertained and even find escape through mental stimulation. Sex, vulgar or artistic, is available to them in countless forms if they wish it, but the type of intellectual speculation they enjoy is presented only in science fiction.

As the readership for science fiction and fantasy began to age in the 1950s, writers were able to introduce more explicit sexuality into their work.

William Tenn wrote in 1949 Venus and the Seven Sexes – featuring the Plookhs, natives of the planet Venus, who require the participation of seven different sexes in order to reproduce and who get corrupted by human film director Hogan Shlestertrap. The rather satirical story might be the first case of an author speculating of creatures having more than two sexes, an idea later taken up by various others.

Philip José Farmer wrote The Lovers (1952), arguably the first science fiction story to feature sex as a major theme, and Strange Relations (1960), a collection of five stories about human/alien sexual relations. In his novel Flesh (1960; expanded 1968), a hypermasculine antlered man ritually impregnates legions of virgins in order to counter declining male fertility.

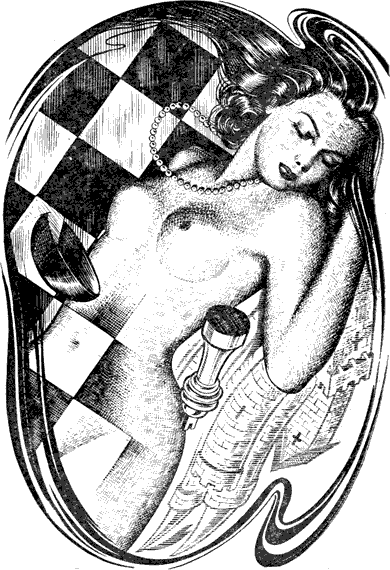
An illustration by Ebel for James E. Gunn's "Breaking Point", appeared in Space Science Fiction, March 1953.

Theodore Sturgeon wrote many stories that emphasised the importance of love regardless of the current social norms, such as The World Well Lost (1953), a classic tale involving alien homosexuality, and the novel Venus Plus X (1960), in which a contemporary man awakens in a futuristic place where the people are hermaphrodites.

When Robert A. Heinlein's The Puppet Masters was originally published in 1951, it was censored by the publisher to remove various references to sex. The opening scene, where the protagonist is called urgently to HQ on an early morning hour, was re-written to remove all mention of his being in bed with a girl he had casually picked up. The published version did mention that the book's alien invaders cause human beings whose bodies they take over to lose sexual feeling – but removed a later section mentioning that after some time on Earth the invaders "discovered sex" and started engaging in wild orgies and even broadcasting them on TV in areas under their control. Thirty years later, with changing mores, Heinlein published the book's full, unexpurgated text. Heinlein's time-travel short story All You Zombies (1959) chronicles a young man (later revealed to be intersex) taken back in time and tricked into impregnating his younger, female self before he underwent a sex change. He then turns out to be the offspring of that union, with the paradoxical result that he is both his own mother and father. In Time Enough for Love (1973), Heinlein's recurring protagonist Lazarus Long – who never grows old and has an extremely long and eventful life – travels backward in time to the period of his own childhood. As an unintentional result, he falls in love with his own mother. He has no guilt feeling about pursuing and eventually consummating that relationship – considering her simply as an extremely attractive young woman named Maureen who just happens to have given birth to him thousands of years ago (as far as his personal timeline is concerned). The sequel, To Sail Beyond the Sunset (1987) takes place after Maureen had discovered the true identity of her lover – and shows that for her part, she was more amused than shocked or angry.

Poul Anderson's 1958 novel War of the Wing-Men, centers on a species of winged intelligent creatures and sexual differences are central to its plot. Of the two mutually-hostile societies featured in the book, one practices monogamous marriage, while in the other there are every spring several days of a wild indiscriminate orgy – and a complete celibacy for the rest of the year. Ironically, both societies alike consider themselves chaste and the other depraved: "We keep faithful to our mates while they fuck around indiscriminately – disgusting!"; "We keep sex where it belongs, to one week per year where you are not really yourself. They do it all over the year- disgusting!". Humans who land on the planet intervene in the centuries-long war, by showing members of the two societies that they are not all that different from each other.

Another Poul Anderson novel of the same period, Virgin Planet (1959), deals in a straightforward manner with homosexuality and polyamory on an exclusively female world. The plot twist is that the protagonist is the only male on a world of women, and though quite a few of them are interested in sex with him, it is never consummated during his sojourn on the planet.

A mirror image was presented by A. Bertram Chandler in Spartan Planet (1969), featuring an exclusively male world, where by definition homosexual relations are the normal (and only) sexual relations. The plot revolves around the explosive social upheaval resulting when the planet is discovered by a spaceship from the wider galaxy, whose crew includes both men and women.

Until the late 1960s, few other writers depicted alternative sexuality or revised gender roles, nor openly investigated sexual questions.

More conventionally, A. Bertram Chandler's books include numerous episodes of free fall sex, his characters (male and female alike) strongly prone to extramarital relations and tending to while away the boring months-long Deep Space voyages by forming complicated love triangles.

== Plots and themes ==
=== New Wave era (1960–70s) ===
By the late 1960s, science fiction and fantasy began to reflect the changes prompted by the civil rights movement and the emergence of a counterculture. Within the genres, these changes were incorporated into a movement called "the New Wave," a movement more skeptical of technology, more liberated socially, and more interested in stylistic experimentation. New Wave writers were more likely to claim an interest in "inner space" instead of outer space. They were less shy about explicit sexuality and more sympathetic to reconsiderations of gender roles and the social status of sexual minorities. Notable authors who often wrote on sexual themes included Joanna Russ, Thomas M. Disch, John Varley, James Tiptree, Jr., and Samuel R. Delany. Under the influence of New Wave editors and authors such as Michael Moorcock (editor of the influential New Worlds magazine) and Ursula K. Le Guin, sympathetic depictions of alternative sexuality and gender multiplied in science fiction and fantasy, becoming commonplace.

In Brian Aldiss's 1960 novel The Interpreter (in the US published as Bow Down to Nul), Earth is a backwater colony planet in the galactic empire of the Nuls, a giant, three-limbed, civilised alien race. The plot, dealing with complicated relations between humans and their Nul rulers, touches among other things on Nul sex. The Nul wear no clothes, but their equivalent of hands and arms are wide membranes which are normally held in a fixed position before the body, not moving even when the "fingers" are manipulating a tool. Only in a sexual context are the hands moved aside, to reveal the genital organs behind – the equivalent of humans undressing. In one scene, the human protagonist is able to tune to an erotic (or pornographic) Nul sensory device, made for internal Nul consumption and not intended for humans, which replicates the wild ecstasy felt by Nuls when daring to move aside their membrane hands and reveal their bodies to each other – similar in some ways to human sexual arousal but also very different.

Robert A. Heinlein's Stranger in a Strange Land (1961) and The Moon Is a Harsh Mistress (1966) both depict heterosexual group marriages and public nudity as desirable social norms, while in Heinlein's Time Enough for Love (1973), the main character argues strongly for the future liberty of homosexual sex. Heinlein's character Lazarus Long, travelling back in time to the period of his own childhood, discovers, to his surprise and (initial) shame, a sexual desire of his own mother – but overcoming this initial shame, he comes to think of her simply as "Maureen", an attractive young woman who is far from indifferent to him.

Samuel R. Delany's Nebula Award-winning short story Aye, and Gomorrah (1967) posits the development of neutered human astronauts, and then depicts the people who become sexually oriented toward them. By imagining a new gender and resultant sexual orientation, the story allows readers to reflect on the real world while maintaining an estranging distance. In his 1975 science fiction novel entitled Dhalgren, Delany colors his large canvas with characters of a wide variety of sexualities. Once again, sex is not the focus of the novel, although it does contain some of the first explicitly described scenes of gay sex in science fiction. Delany depicts, mostly with affection, characters with a wide variety of motivations and behaviours, with the effect of revealing to the reader the fact that these kinds of people exist in the real world. In later works, Delany blurs the line between science fiction and gay pornography. Delany faced resistance from book distribution companies for his treatment of these topics.

In 1968, Anne McCaffrey's Dragonflight launched the Dragonriders of Pern series, depicting the lives of humans living in close partnership with dragons. In a key scene, the young golden Dragon Queen takes off on her mating flight, pursued by the male dragons – until finally one of them catches up with her and they engage in passionate mating high up in the air, their necks and wings curled around each other. On the ground the woman and man who are these dragons' riders share their passion telepathically – and inevitably wildly embrace and kiss, embarking in parallel human mating.

Ursula K. Le Guin explores radically alternative forms of sexuality in The Left Hand of Darkness (1969) and again in Coming of Age in Karhide (1995), which imagine the sexuality of an alien "human" species in which individuals are neither "male" nor "female," but undergo a monthly sexual cycle in which they randomly experience the activation of either male or female sexual organs and reproductive abilities; this makes them in a sense bisexual, and in other senses androgynous or hermaphroditic. It is common for an individual of that species to undergo at some moment of life pregnancy and birth-giving, while at another time having the male role and impregnating somebody else. In the novel the king of Karhide, who appears externally male, becomes pregnant.

Le Guin has written considerations of her own work in two essays, "Is Gender Necessary?" (1976) and "Is Gender Necessary? Redux" (1986), which respond to feminist and other criticism of The Left Hand of Darkness. In these essays, she makes it clear that the novel's assumption that Gethenians would automatically find a mate of the gender opposite to the gender they were becoming produced an unintended heteronormativity. Le Guin has subsequently written many stories that examine the possibilities science fiction allows for non-traditional sexuality, such as the sexual bonding between clones in Nine Lives (1968) and the four-way marriages in Mountain Ways (1996).

The complicated plot of Roger Zelazny's 1970 fantasy novel The Guns of Avalon includes the protagonist Corwin meeting and having sex with Dara, who seems a normal (and very attractive) young woman. But at the end of the book, when she walks the powerfully magical "Pattern" she is changing, her hair "crackling with static electricity" and then she seems to grow horns and hoofs, then becomes an enormous cat, then "a bright winged thing of indescribable beauty" followed by "a tower of ashes". Finally, she again becomes a recognizable Dara, but "tall and magnificent, both beautiful and somehow horrible at the same time, her arms raised in exultation and inhuman laughter flowing from her lips". Shocked, Corwin wonders "had I truly held, caressed, made love to - that?". While Corwin struggles with feeling mightily repelled and simultaneously attracted as never before, the changed Dara declares herself his mortal enemy and nemesis - and disappears. Zelazny's publishers had no problem with this final scene and its ambiguous sexual connotations, but they did object to an earlier sex scene - straightforward but explicit by 1970s American publishing standards - between Corwin and the seemingly normal Dara. Zelazny was amused when the book's editor asked him to remove it "so that sales to libraries would not be jeopardized". That deleted scene has never appeared with the novel, even in later editions when mores had become more elastic, but has been printed for the first time in The Collected Stories of Roger Zelazny, Volume 3: This Mortal Mountain.

In his 1972 novel The Gods Themselves, Isaac Asimov describes an alien race with three sexes, all of them necessary for sexual reproduction. One sex produces a form of sperm, another sex provides the energy needed for reproduction, and members of the third sex bear and raise the offspring. All three genders are included in sexual and social norms of expected and acceptable behavior. In this same novel, the hazards and problems of sex in microgravity are described, and while people born on the Moon are proficient at it, people from Earth are not.

Similarly, Poul Anderson's Three Worlds to Conquer depicts centaur-like beings living on Jupiter who have three genders: female, male and "demi-male". In order to conceive, a female must have sex with both a male and a demi-male within a short time of each other. In the society of the protagonist, there are stable, harmonious three-way families, in effect a formalized Menage a Trois, with the three partners on equal terms with each other. An individual in that society feels a strong attachment to all three parents – mother, father and demi-father – who all take part in bringing up the young. Conversely, among the harsh invaders who threaten to destroy the protagonist's homeland and culture, males are totally dominant over both females and demi-males; the latter are either killed at birth or preserved in subjugation for reproduction – which the protagonist regards as a barbaric aberration.

In Anderson's satirical story A Feast for the Gods, the Greek god Hermes visits modern America and has casual sex with an American woman, who tells him that she is "on the pill" and does not take seriously Hermes telling her that "The Embrace of a God is always fertile". She ends up pregnant and destined to give birth to a modern demi god.

Feminist science fiction authors imagined cultures in which homo- and bisexuality and a variety of gender models are the norm. Joanna Russ's award-winning short story "When It Changed" (1972), portraying a female-only lesbian society that flourished without men, and her novel The Female Man (1975), were enormously influential. Russ was largely responsible for introducing radical lesbian feminism into science fiction.

The bisexual female writer Alice Bradley Sheldon, who used James Tiptree, Jr. as her pen name, explored the sexual impulse as her main theme. Some stories by Tiptree portray humans becoming sexually obsessed with aliens, such as "And I Awoke and Found Me Here on the Cold Hill's Side" (1972), or aliens being sexually abused. The Girl Who Was Plugged In (1973) is an early precursor of cyberpunk that depicts a relationship via a cybernetically controlled body. In her award-winning novella Houston, Houston, Do You Read? (1976), Tiptree presents a female-only society after the extinction of men from disease. The society lacks stereotypically "male" problems such as war but is stagnant. The women reproduce via cloning, and consider men to be comical.

In Robert Silverberg's novelette The Way to Spook City the protagonist meets and has an affair with a woman named Jill, who seems completely human – and convincingly, passionately female human. Increasingly in love with her, he still has a nagging suspicion that she is in fact a disguised member of the mysterious extraterrestrial species known as "Spooks", who had invaded and taken over a large part of the United States. Until the end, he repeatedly grapples with two questions: Is she human or a Spook? And if she is a Spook, could the two of them nevertheless build a life together?

In the centuries-long, futile space war described in Joe Haldeman's The Forever War, the protagonist's increasing feeling of alienation is manifested, among other things, when he is appointed as the commanding officer of a "strike force" whose soldiers are exclusively homosexual, and who resent being commanded by a heterosexual. Later in the book, he finds that while he was fighting in space, humanity has begun to clone itself, resulting in a new, collective species calling itself simply Man. Luckily for the protagonist, Man has established several colonies of old-style, heterosexual humans, just in case the evolutionary change proves to be a mistake. In one of these colonies, the protagonist is happily reunited with his long-lost beloved and they embark upon monogamous marriage and on having children through sexual reproduction and female pregnancy – an incredibly archaic and old-fashioned way of life for most of that time's humanity.

Elizabeth A. Lynn's science fiction novel A Different Light (1978) features a same-sex relationship between two men and inspired the name of the LGBT bookstore chain A Different Light. Lynn's The Chronicles of Tornor (1979–80) series of novels, the first of which won the World Fantasy Award, were among the first fantasy novels to include gay relationships as an unremarkable part of the cultural background. Lynn also wrote novels depicting sadomasochism.

John Varley, who also came to prominence in the 1970s, is another writer who examined sexual themes in his work. In his "Eight Worlds" suite of stories and novels, humanity has achieved the ability to change sex quickly, easily and completely reversibly – leading to a casual attitude with people changing their sex back and forth as the sudden whim takes them. Homophobia is shown as initially inhibiting the uptake of this technology, as it engenders drastic changes in relationships, with bisexuality becoming the default mode for society. Sexual themes are central to the story "Options": a married woman, Cleo, living in King City, undergoes a change to male despite her husband's objections. As "Leo" she finds out what it means to be a man in her society and even becomes her husband's best friend. She also learns that people are adopting new names that are historically neither male nor female. She eventually returns to female as "Nile". Varley's Gaea trilogy (1979-1984) features lesbian protagonists.

Female characters in science fiction films, such as Barbarella (1968), continued to be often portrayed as simple sex kittens.

=== Modern SF (post-New Wave) ===
After the pushing back of boundaries in the 1960s and 70s, sex in genre science fiction gained wider acceptance and was often incorporated into otherwise conventional science fiction stories with little comment.

In 1968 Jack Vance introduced the Planet of Adventure, inhabited by four different alien races, each with its own distinct society and culture. One of these – the predatory, part feline, part bird-like Dirdir – is described as having a very complex sexuality, with many different genders that leads to many different combinations of gender-compatibility when it comes to sex and breeding, though each breeding still seems to involve only two individuals.

Jack L. Chalker's Well World series, launched in 1977, depicts a world – designed by the super science of a vanished extraterrestrial race, the Markovians – which is divided into numerous "hexes", each inhabited by different sentient race. Anyone entering one of these hexes is transformed into a member of the local race. This plot device gives a wide scope for exploring the divergent biology and cultures of the various species – including their sex life. For example, a human entering a hex inhabited by an insectoid intelligent race is transformed into a female of that species, feels sexual desire for a male and mates with him. Too late does she discover that in this species, pregnancy is fatal – the mother being devoured from the inside by her larvae.

In a later part, a very macho villain gains control of a supercomputer whose power includes the ability to "redesign" people's bodies to almost any specification. He uses the computer to give himself a "super-virile" body, capable of a virtually unlimited number of erections and ejaculations – and then proceeds to transform his male enemies into beautiful women and induce in them a strong sexual desire towards himself. However, a computer breakdown restores to these captives their normal minds. Though they are still in women's bodies, these bodies were designed with great strength and stamina, so as to enable them to undergo repeated sexual encounters. Thus, they are well-equipped to chase, catch and suitably punish their abuser.

In Frederik Pohl's Jem, humans exploring the eponymous planet Jem discover by experience that local beings emit a milt which has a strong aphrodisiac effect on humans. Characters who were hitherto not at all drawn to each other find themselves suddenly involved in wild, uncontrollable sex. At the ironic ending, their descendants who colonize the planet and build up a distinctive society and culture develop the custom of celebrating Christmas by deliberately stimulating the local beings into emitting the milt, and then taking off their clothes and engaging in a wild indiscriminate orgy – their copulations accompanied by a chorus of the planet's enslaved indigenous beings who were taught to sing "Good King Wenceslas", with the song's Christian significance long forgotten.

Also set on an alien planet, Octavia E. Butler's acclaimed short story "Bloodchild" (1984) depicts the complex relationship between human refugees and the insect-like aliens who keep them in a preserve to protect them, but also to use them as hosts for breeding their young. Sometimes called Butler's "pregnant man story," "Bloodchild" won the Nebula Award, Hugo Award, and Locus Award. Other of Butler's works explore miscegenation, non-consensual sex, and hybridity.

In Robert Silverberg's 1982 novella Homefaring, the protagonist enters the mind of an intelligent lobster of the very far future and experiences all aspects of lobster life, including sex: "He approached a female, knowing precisely which one was the appropriate one, and sang to her, and she acknowledged his song with a song of her own, and raised her third pair of legs for him, and let him plant his gametes beside her oviducts. There was no apparent pleasure in it, as he remembered pleasure from his time as a human. Yet it brought him a subtle but unmistakable sense of fulfillment, of the completion of biological destiny, that had a kind of orgasmic finality about it, and left him calm and anchored at the absolute dead center of his soul". When finally returning to his human body and his human lover, he keeps longing for the lobster life, to "his mate and her millions of larvae".

Quentin and Alice, the extremely shy and insecure protagonists of Lev Grossman's fantasy novel The Magicians, spend years as fellow students at a School of Magic without admitting to being deeply in love with each other. Only the experience of being magically turned into foxes enables them at last to break through their reserve: "Increasingly, Quentin noticed one scent more than the others. It was a sharp, acrid, skunky musk that probably would have smelled like cat piss to a human being, but to a fox it was like a drug. He tackled the source of the smell, buried his snuffling muzzle in her fur, because he had known all along, with what was left of his consciousness, that what he was smelling was Alice. Vulpine hormones and instincts were powering up, taking over, manhandling what was left of his rational human mind."

The next sequence depicts animal sex: "He locked his teeth in the thick fur of her neck. It didn't seem to hurt her any, or at least not in a way that was easily distinguishable from pleasure. He caught a glimpse of Alice's wild, dark fox eyes rolling with terror and then half shutting with pleasure. Their tiny quick breathes puffed white in the air and mingled and disappeared. Her white fox fur was coarse and smooth at the same time, and she made little yipping sounds every time he pushed himself deeper inside her. He never wanted to stop". When resuming their human bodies, Quentin and Alice are initially even more shy and awkward with each other, and only after going through some harrowing magical experiences are they finally able to have human sex.

Lois McMaster Bujold explores many areas of sexuality in the multiple award-winning novels and stories of her Vorkosigan Saga (1986-ongoing), which are set in a fictional universe influenced by the availability of uterine replicators and significant genetic engineering. These areas include an all-male society, promiscuity, monastic celibacy, hermaphroditism, and bisexuality.

In the Mythopoeic Award-winning novel Unicorn Mountain (1988), Michael Bishop includes a gay male AIDS patient among the carefully drawn central characters who must respond to an irruption of dying unicorns at their Colorado ranch. The death of the hedonistic gay culture, and the safe sex campaign resulting from the AIDS epidemic, are explored, both literally and metaphorically.

Sex has a major role in Harry Turtledove's 1990 novel A World of Difference, taking place on the planet Minerva (a more habitable analogue of Mars). Minervan animals (including the sentient Minervans) are hexameristically radially symmetrical. This means that they have six eyes spaced equally all around, see in all directions and have no "back" where somebody could sneak on them unnoticed. Females (referred to as "mates" by the Minervans) give birth to litters that consist of one male and five females, and the "mates" always die after reproducing because of torrential bleeding from the places where the six fetuses were attached; this gives a population multiplication of 5 per generation if all females live to adolescence and reproduce.

Females reach puberty while still hardly out of childhood, and typically experience sex only once in the lifetime – leading to pregnancy and death at birth-giving. Thus, in Minervan society male dominance seems truly determined by a biological imperative – though it takes different forms in various Minervan societies: in some females are considered expendable and traded as property, in other they are cherished and their tragic fate mourned – but still, their dependent status is taken for granted. The American women arriving on Minerva and discovering this situation consider it intolerable; a major plot element is their efforts, using the resources of Earth medical science, to find a way of saving the Minervan females and letting them survive birth-giving. At the end, they do manage to save a particularly sympathetic Minervan female – potentially opening the way for a complete upheaval in Minervan society.

Sex is also an important ingredient in another of Harry Turtledove's works, the Worldwar Series of Alternative History, based on the premise of reptile extraterrestrials, nicknamed "The Lizards", invading Earth in 1942, forcing humans to terminate the Second World War and unite against this common enemy. As depicted by Turtledove, the "Lizards" have no concept whatever that sex ought to be private, and they engage in it in public as in any other activity. This leads to human beings in areas occupied by them feeling shocked and outraged by the "immorality" of their new masters - especially that the invaders, preferring hot climates, prioritize conquest of the Arab and Islamic countries. For their part, the invaders are genuinely puzzled by the Humans' insistence on having privacy for sex and their outrage when reptile warriors walk in on them when engaged in it. As gradually becomes clear, on their home planet, the "Lizards" have a clearly defined mating season, when normal activity ceases and they engage in a days-long, indiscriminate orgy; as their young can fend for themselves from the moment of hatching from the egg, there is no of parental care and they have no marriages or families, and thus there is no reason to establish paternity. Outside the mating season, sex does not occur among them and does not concern them. However, when arriving on Earth they soon discover that ginger, an innocuous spice to humans, acts as a powerful narcotic on the invaders' physiology - and that it causes their females to become sexually active and emit pheromones, out of the normal season. This causes an unaccustomed disruption of their daily activity, with females who had taken ginger suddenly becoming sexual, males and females then feeling compelled to immediately engage in mating before they could resume their daily work. This also arises the phenomenon of females deliberately taking ginger in return for payment - prostitution having been completely unknown in their society before their arrival on Earth.

In the far future human colony of Frederik Pohl's The World at the End of Time, the common way to produce new humans is for a geneticist to take DNA samples from two or more "parents" – regardless of their being male or female. The DNA is then combined in a laboratory, and the parents arrive to pick up the baby nine months later. The few couples who prefer to do it in the old fashioned way, a man sexually impregnating a woman, are considered strange but harmless eccentrics.

Glory Season (1993) by David Brin is set on the planet Stratos, inhabited by a strain of human beings designed to conceive clones in winter, and normal children in summer. All clones are female, because males cannot reproduce themselves individually. Further, males and females have opposed seasons of sexual receptivity; women are sexually receptive in winter, and men in summer. (This unusual heterogamous reproductive cycle is known to be evolutionarily advantageous for some species of aphids.) The novel treats themes of separatist feminism and biological determinism.

Elizabeth Bear's novel Carnival (2006) revisits the trope of the single-gender world, as a pair of gay male ambassador-spies attempt to infiltrate and subvert the predominately lesbian civilization of New Amazonia, whose matriarchal rulers have all but enslaved their men.

The fantasy world of Scott Lynch's 2007 Red Seas Under Red Skies offers a new variation on the long-established genre of pirate literature – depicting a pirate ship which is run on the basis of complete gender equality. The pirate crew is composed of a roughly equal number of men and women, and crew members may freely engage in sex – homosexual or heterosexual, as they choose – when off duty. Since shipboard life offers little chance of privacy, the sound of people having a noisy orgasm is a normal part of night time routine on board the Poison Orchid.

However, any attempt at a sexual act without the other person's sexual consent is punished immediately and severely. The formidable Captain Zamira Drakasha is raising her two children aboard, and is well able to combine being a deadly fighter and strict disciplinarian with her role as a loving and doting mother – but having children aboard is a privilege reserved to the Captain alone; other female pirates who get pregnant must leave their children on shore.

The plot of The Tamír Triad by Lynn Flewelling has a major transsexual element. To begin with the protagonist, Prince Tobin, is to all appearances a male – both in his own perception and in that of others. Boys who swim naked together with Tobin have no reason to doubt his male anatomy. Yet, due to the magical reasons which are an important part of the plot, in the underlying, essential identity Tobin had always been a disguised girl. In the series' cataclysmic scene of magical change, this becomes an evident physical fact, and Prince Tobin becomes Queen Tamír, shedding the male body and gaining a fully functioning female one. Yet, it takes Tamír a considerable time and effort to come to terms with her female sexuality.

In Lateral Magazine, The freedom of a genre: Sexuality in speculative fiction:

In another twist of today's society, Nontraditional Love by Rafael Grugman (2008) puts together an upside-down society where heterosexuality is outlawed, and homosexuality is the norm. A 'traditional' family unit consists of two dads with a surrogate mother. Alternatively, two mothers, one of whom bears a child. In a nod to the always-progressive Netherlands, this country is the only country progressive enough to allow opposite sex marriage. This is perhaps the most obvious example of cognitive estrangement. It puts the reader in the shoes of the oppressed by modelling an entire world of opposites around a fairly "normal" everyday heterosexual protagonist. A heterosexual reader would not only be able to identify with the main character but be immersed in a world as oppressive and bigoted as the real world has been for homosexuals and the queer community throughout history.

The 2018 Fantasy novel Stone Unturned, set in Lawrence Watt-Evans' magical world of Ethshar, begins with the young wizard Morvash of the Shadows discovering that some of the statues in his uncle's house were real people turned to stone, and sets out to do the right thing. What Morvash considered the most disturbing of these statues "was hidden away in a sort of marble grotto in the garden behind the house, and depicted a young man and a young woman in what might politely be called an intimate embrace, or a compromising position. They were not in the sort of elegant pose that artists use for erotica, with graceful lines displaying the female's curves and the male's muscles. They were in an earthier position. The woman — a girl, really — was on her back, with her knees drawn up to her chest and her head raised as her blank stone eyes stared perpetually at the man's belly. Her mouth was open as if panting. Her partner was kneeling between her legs, leaning forward over her, one hand grabbing her shoulder, the other occupied elsewhere. His eyes were closed, but his mouth was also open; Morvash thought it was more of a moan than a pant. He could almost smell the sweat. Neither wore any clothing whatsoever, nor were there any artfully-placed draperies or fig leaves to obscure the details. Had the wizard responsible for this petrifaction timed it deliberately, or had he caught them in this position by accident?"

Eventually, it turns out that the couple were Prince Marek of Melitha and Darissa the Witch's Apprentice, who had fallen deeply in love with each other during a war that threatened their kingdom and who sought to celebrate victory with a bout of intensive sex in the privacy of the Prince's bedchamber – but were surprised and turned into stone by a wizard in the employ of the Prince's envious sister, who sought to seize the throne. Afterwards, the couple spent forty petrified years, dimly conscious, perpetually caught in their sexual act and forming a prized item in Lord Landessin's sculpture collection. When the wizard Morvash finally manages to bring them back to life, they find themselves lying on the floor in a big hall, surrounded by various other people who were also revived from petrifaction, and hasten to disengage and look for something to cover their nakedness. After various other adventures, they finally get married and fully clothed mount the throne of Melitha as King and Queen.

== See also ==
- Gender in speculative fiction
- The Hawkeye Initiative
- James Tiptree, Jr. Award
- LGBT themes in speculative fiction
- Reproduction and pregnancy in speculative fiction
- Rishathra
- Single-gender world
- Slash fiction
- Philip José Farmer#Sexual Themes
