= The Other Log of Phileas Fogg =

1973 novel by Philip José Farmer

- First edition
- Author: Philip José Farmer
- Cover artist: Jack Gaughan
- Language: English
- Genre: Science fiction, steampunk
- Publisher: Daw Books
- Publication date: 1973
- Publication place: United States
- Media type: Print (paperback)
- Pages: 304
- ISBN: 0-8125-2468-3
- OCLC: 221324590
- Preceded by: Time's Last Gift
- Followed by: Traitor to the Living

The Other Log of Phileas Fogg is a science fiction novel written by American author Philip José Farmer in 1973. Reviving the Phileas Fogg character created by Jules Verne, the novel has also been classified as steampunk and a parallel novel. It was originally published by DAW Books and later reprinted in 1979 by Hamlyn and again in 1982 by Tor Books. Tor has subsequently reissued the novel in 1988 and 1993.

== Plot introduction ==
The story takes place within the internal reality first imagined in the 1872 Jules Verne novel, Around the World in Eighty Days. Farmer includes many of the story's original characters, including Phileas Fogg and his French valet, Passepartout. He establishes that all of Verne's published works take place within the same shared continuity. He includes elements of crossover fiction, incorporating the Arthur Conan Doyle characters of Sherlock Holmes and James Moriarty into his setting. These elements place Phileas Fogg and his entire supporting cast into the Wold Newton family of literary characters.

In an introduction, Farmer posits that Verne's story was not simply an article of fiction, but the chronology of actual events, which Verne later decided to adapt into a fictional setting. In the book's epilogue, Farmer playfully alludes to the notion that Phileas Fogg is still alive, and may in fact be the actual author of the story (Farmer notes that they both share the same initials, suggesting that Philip Farmer is actually an alias for Phileas Fogg).

From Farmer's perspective, Jules Verne revealed only a small and significantly subdued portion of the actual background and exploits of Phileas Fogg. He establishes that the events surrounding Around the World in Eighty Days are actually a singular aspect of a greater conflict taking place between two immortal alien races, the Eridani and the Capellas. Farmer's story does not challenge any of the elements of the original text, but rather it adds an ambitious secondary tale taking place behind (and often in between) the scenes of Verne's material.

== Plot summary ==
Phileas Fogg is a mysterious British gentleman who lives with his valet Passepartout at No. 7 Saville Row in Burlington Gardens during the latter half of the 19th century. Unbeknownst to his peers, he is also the immortal foster child of a race of humanoid aliens known as the Eridani. A man of great intellect and affluence, Fogg enters into a wager with a fellow Eridanian citing that he can circumnavigate the globe in exactly eighty days. Although witnesses feel that his claim is little more than the boasting of a rich eccentric, Fogg is in fact undertaking a secret mission on behalf of his Eridanian colleagues.

Along with Passepartout, Fogg begins a quest to find a piece of stolen alien technology – a teleportation device that had recently fallen into the hands of the Eridani rivals, an alien race known as the Capellas. His journey brings him face to face with the infamous sea scourge Captain Nemo, a Capellan agent who is also known in British circles by his nom de guerre – James Moriarty. The two combatants match wits with one another at several key locations, including the mysterious ghost ship known as the Mary Celeste.

The journey climaxes with a final battle at Fogg's home in London, mere moments before meeting the deadline required to win his world-spanning wager.

== See also ==
- Doc Savage: His Apocalyptic Life
- Wold Newton family

== Notes ==
The novel concludes with a twenty-one page addendum written by H.W. Starr entitled "A Submersible Subterfuge or Proof Impositive". It originally appeared in Leaves from the Copper Beeches and published for the Sons of the Copper Beeches Scion Society of the Baker Street Irregulars; Livingston Publishing Company, Narberth, 1959.

Starr exhaustively details the irreconcilable inconsistencies that take place within Verne's Twenty Thousand Leagues Under the Sea, and its companion novel, The Mysterious Island (which likewise features the character of Captain Nemo). He further contrasts the life and personality of Nemo, as originally presented by Verne, with that of James Moriarty – nemesis of Sherlock Holmes. Information contained within the addendum actually challenges Farmer's merging of both characters, citing specific comparisons of age, personality and lineage.
