= The Green Odyssey =

1957 novel by Philip José Farmer

First edition. Cover art by Richard M. Powers.

The Green Odyssey is an American science fiction novel written by Philip José Farmer. It was Farmer's first book-length publication, originally released by Ballantine in 1957. Unlike much of Farmer’s earlier short fiction, the novel contains no sexual themes, although his following book Flesh returned to those motifs. The novel also appeared in the background of the first episode of The Twilight Zone.

== Plot summary ==
The Green Odyssey is an adventure story, involving an astronaut named Alan Green stranded on a primitive planet, where he is claimed as a gigolo by a duchess and is married to a slave woman. Upon hearing of two other stranded astronauts, he escapes from the duchess, and sets sail to find them. However, because of the peculiar geography of the planet, there is a vast expansive plain, instead of an ocean to cross. Green uses a ship equipped with large rolling pin-like wheels along the bottom to traverse the plains of this world.

After his escape from the duchess he is followed by his slave woman wife and her children (one is his). There follow several fairly standard adventure plots with cannibals, pirates, floating islands (that turn out to be giant lawnmowers), and the deus ex machina, a female black cat named Lady Luck.

== Reaction and analysis ==
Floyd C. Gale wrote that The Green Odyssey seemed "a routine space opera" and that Farmer "almost makes a mishmash of the ending, but doesn't". Other reviews were also mixed. Many were disappointed by this new work after Farmer's widely praised "The Lovers". While that story was almost universally regarded as unique and excellently written, The Green Odyssey was frequently criticised for being clichéd and generic. For instance, author and critic Damon Knight said in the November 1957 issue of Infinity that the book was a "pastel pastiche, superficial and generic, of Tarzan, Conan [...] and heaven knows what else". However, in hindsight, The Green Odyssey was perhaps a deliberate pastiche of pulp novels, similar to Farmer's later A Feast Unknown and, to a lesser extent, his fictional biographies Tarzan Alive and Doc Savage: His Apocalyptic Life.
