= Tongues of the Moon =

1964 novel by Philip José Farmer

First edition, published by Pyramid Books. Cover art by Ed Emshwiller.

Tongues of the Moon is a science fiction novel by American writer Philip José Farmer. Originally released in 1964, the book is an action story, focusing on fighting and combat scenes rather than a complex plot. It was initially printed as a novella in Amazing Stories.

In Tongues of the Moon, colonists on Earth's Moon engage in a small-scale war after a nuclear holocaust on Earth. The warring parties include the Soviet Union, here allied with the United States, and a military faction called the "South Atlantic Axis".

The novel was reprinted several times, primarily by Pyramid Books.
