= Phantasia Press =

American small publisher

George Barr's cover illustration for Phantasia's first publication, L. Sprague de Camp and Fletcher Pratt's Wall of Serpents (Phantasia, 1978).

Phantasia Press LLC is an American small publisher formed by Alex Berman and the late Sidney Altus publishing hardcover limited editions of science fiction and fantasy books. It was active from 1978 to 1989. In 2023, Phantasia Press resumed publishing with releasing Mickey7 by Edward Ashton. In 2024 Diana Petroff joined Alex Berman as partner and co-publisher.

The company is based in West Bloomfield, Michigan. The publisher specializes in limited quality first hardcover editions of authors prominent in the field, particularly Philip José Farmer, C. J. Cherryh, L. Sprague de Camp and Alan Dean Foster. Some of its offerings were true first editions; others, the first hardcover editions of works previously published in paperback. In a few instances there had been previous hardcover editions.

The press started publication with a reprint of Wall of Serpents (L. Sprague de Camp and Fletcher Pratt) and then The Reign of Wizardry (Jack Williamson).

Authors published by Phantasia are Poul Anderson, Edward Ashton, Isaac Asimov (2 books), Steven Barnes, David Brin (3 books), Fredric Brown, Orson Scott Card, C. J. Cherryh (7 books), Arthur C. Clarke, Catherine Crook de Camp (2 books), L. Sprague de Camp (5 books), Harlan Ellison (2 books), Philip José Farmer (9 books), Alan Dean Foster (5 books), William Gibson, Stephen King, Larry Niven (3 books), Jerry Pournelle, Fletcher Pratt, Mike Resnick (2 books), Spider Robinson, William Shatner, Robert Silverberg, Jack Williamson (2 books), and Roger Zelazny.

Artists contributing cover art to Phantasia editions included Randall Asplund, Wayne D. Barlowe, George Barr (3 covers), Doug Beekman, Jim Burns, David A. Cherry (7 covers), Alex Ebel (3 covers), Stephen Fabian, Frank Kelly Freas (2 covers), Kevin Eugene Johnson (6 covers), Eric Ladd, Paul Lehr (4 covers), Carl Lundgren, Jane Mackenzie, Chris Miller, Rowena Morrill (2 covers), Phil Parks, John Pound, Victoria Poyser (3 covers), Kirk Reinert, Romas, Alex Schomburg, Barclay Shaw (2 covers), Darrell K. Sweet, Václav Vaca, Ed Valigursky, and Michael Whelan.

== Bibliography of works published ==
- Wall of Serpents (1978) (L. Sprague de Camp, Fletcher Pratt)
- The Reign of Wizardry (1979) (Jack Williamson)
- The Ringworld Engineers (December 1979) (Larry Niven)
- The Maker of Universes (1980) (Philip José Farmer)
- The Purple Pterodactyls (January 1980) (L. Sprague de Camp)
- The Magic Labyrinth (May 1980) (Philip José Farmer)
- Firestarter (July 1980) (Stephen King)
- The Humanoid Touch (September 1980) (Jack Williamson)
- The Gates of Creation (1981) (Philip José Farmer)
- Dream Park (March 1981) (Larry Niven, Steven Barnes)
- A Private Cosmos (July 1981) (Philip José Farmer)
- Madwand (July 1981) (Roger Zelazny)
- Oath of Fealty (August 1981) (Larry Niven, Jerry Pournelle)
- Behind the Walls of Terra (1982) (Philip José Farmer)
- The Prisoner of Zhamanak (1982) (L. Sprague de Camp)
- A Barnstormer in Oz or a Rationalization and Extrapolation of the Split-Level Continuum (August 1982) (Philip José Farmer)
- Stalking the Nightmare (September 1982) (Harlan Ellison)
- 2010: Odyssey Two (October 1982) (Arthur C. Clarke)
- Orion Shall Rise (1983) (Poul Anderson)
- The Robots of Dawn (1983) (Isaac Asimov)
- The Lavalite World (1983) (Philip José Farmer)
- Homefaring (1983) (Robert Silverberg)
- Spellsinger at the Gate (1983) (Alan Dean Foster)
- Orion Shall Rise (1983) (Poul Anderson)
- The Robots of Dawn (1983) (Isaac Asimov)
- The Bones of Zora (1983) (L. Sprague de Camp, Catherine Crook de Camp)
- Gods of Riverworld (August 1983) (Philip José Farmer)
- Forty Thousand in Gehenna (October 1983) (C. J. Cherryh)
- River of Eternity (November 1983) (Philip José Farmer)
- Eros Ascending (March 1984) (Mike Resnick)
- The Day of the Dissonance (June 1984) (Alan Dean Foster)
- Chanur's Venture (October 1984) (C. J. Cherryh)
- Eros at Zenith (October 1984) (Mike Resnick)
- The Moment of the Magician (October 1984) (Alan Dean Foster)
- Cuckoo's Egg (May 1985) (C. J. Cherryh)
- The Kif Strike Back (May 1985) (C. J. Cherryh)
- Medea: Harlan's World (June 1985) (Harlan Ellison)
- Robots and Empire (September 1985) (Isaac Asimov)
- Startide Rising (November 1985) (David Brin)
- The Paths of the Perambulator (November 1985) (Alan Dean Foster)
- Visible light (January 1986) (C. J. Cherryh)
- Neuromancer (May 1986) (William Gibson)
- Chanur's Homecoming (August 1986) (C. J. Cherryh)
- The Time of the Transference (August 1986) (Alan Dean Foster)
- Callahan and Company (1987) (Spider Robinson)
- The Pride of Chanur (March 1987) (C. J. Cherryh)
- The Uplift War (April 1987) (David Brin)
- The Incorporated Knight (August 1987) (L. Sprague de Camp, Catherine Crook de Camp)
- And the Gods Laughed (October 1987) (Fredric Brown)
- The Folk of the Fringe (April 1989) (Orson Scott Card)
- TekWar (October 1989) (William Shatner)
- Mickey 7 (August 2023) (Edward Ashton)
- Sundiver (Fall 2024) (David Brin)
