= River of Eternity =

1983 novel by Philip José Farmer

- Cover of first edition
- Author: Philip José Farmer
- Cover artist: John Pound
- Language: English
- Genre: Science fiction
- Publisher: Phantasia Press
- Publication date: November 1983
- Publication place: United States
- Media type: Print (hardback & paperback)
- Pages: 205
- ISBN: 0-932096-28-X
- OCLC: 10284904

River of Eternity is a science fiction novel by American writer Philip José Farmer (1918-2009). It is an early version of what became Farmer's popular Riverworld series of novels (1971–83), in which all of humanity has been resurrected and resettled on an artificial "river planet".

== Publication history ==
The original "Riverworld" story was a 150,000-word novel titled Owe for the Flesh, which ended with a protagonist named Richard Black (based on the real-life British Arabist and explorer Richard Francis Burton) finding the tower at the end of the river. Farmer wrote it in a single month in 1952 and promptly entered it in a science fiction novel contest run by Shasta Publishers and subsidized by Pocket Books. He won the contest but received no money. The work was never published and was lost in its original form. Farmer revised and retitled the book River of Eternity, but that version remained unpublished as well and was thought lost. Farmer then reworked the material yet again into two separate novellas: The Day of the Great Shout, which appeared in the January 1965 issue of Worlds of Tomorrow, and The Suicide Express, which appeared in the March 1966 issue of Worlds of Tomorrow. (By now the protagonist was out in the open as a fictionalized Burton.) The novellas were expanded and combined in 1971 as the novel To Your Scattered Bodies Go and three sequels constituting the Riverworld sequence of novels followed in 1977, '80 and '83. Then in 1983, a copy of the old River of Eternity manuscript was discovered in a garage and published by Phantasia Press. Farmer recounts the whole story in his introduction to the Phantasia edition of River of Eternity.

== See also ==
- Philip José Farmer bibliography
