= Fire and the Night =

1962 novel by Philip José Farmer

- Cover of the first edition.
- Author: Philip José Farmer
- Language: English
- Publisher: Regency Books
- Publication date: 1962

Fire and the Night is a novel by American writer Philip José Farmer. It was published in 1962 by Regency Books, as a paperback costing 50 cents. Unusual for Farmer, the novel contains no science fiction or otherwise fantastic themes. It was his first "mainstream" book, but did not attract much attention from critics or readers alike. It has been recently reprinted by Subterranean Press in the collection The Other in the Mirror.

Fire and the Night tells the story of a Caucasian man and an African-American woman who work at a contemporary steel mill. The man becomes attracted to the woman, who is married, and the book follows their struggle to understand their feelings.
