= Riders of the Purple Wage =

1967 novella by Philip José Farmer

- Cover of the eponymous collection
- Author: Philip José Farmer
- Language: English
- Genre: Science fiction
- Published in: Dangerous Visions
- Publisher: Doubleday
- Publication date: 1967
- Media type: Print (Hardcover)
- Award: Hugo Award for Best Novella (1968)

"Riders of the Purple Wage" (1967) is a science fiction novella by American writer Philip José Farmer. It appeared in Dangerous Visions, the New Wave science fiction anthology compiled by Harlan Ellison and won the Hugo Award for best novella in 1968, jointly with Weyr Search by Anne McCaffrey.

The title of the story is a take-off on Riders of the Purple Sage (1912), a Western novel by the American author Zane Grey. The novella contains multiple stylistic and literary allusions to James Joyce and his works; as with Ulysses (1922), it includes canonic references, journal entries, poem pieces, and standard prose, and the main character's surname is Winnegan, an allusion to Finnegans Wake (1939).

== Plot introduction ==
"Riders of the Purple Wage" is an extrapolation of the mid-twentieth century's tendency towards state supervision and consumer-oriented economic planning. In the story, all citizens receive a basic income (the purple wage) from the government, to which everyone is entitled just by being born. The population is self-segregated into relatively small communities, with a controlled environment. It keeps in contact with the rest of the world through the Fido, a combination of television and videophone. The typical dwelling is an egg-shaped house, outside of which is a realistic simulation of an open environment with sky, sun, and moon. In reality, each community is on one level of a multi-level arcology. For those who dislike this lifestyle, there are wildlife reserves where they can join "tribes" of Native Americans and like-minded Anglos living closer to nature for a while. Some choose this lifestyle permanently.

Art (and art appreciation) are prominently displayed in this society. Artists receive press coverage comparable to that of today's movie stars. The art critics are hardly glamorous, each of whom has a pet theory about art. A critic also acts as an agent and manager, promoting the work of one or more artists, especially if their work seems to support his ideas. The story revolves around one of these pampered artists, who sometimes finds himself uninspired, due to the lack of major conflicts in society.

Sexual relations and sexual orientation are portrayed as absolutely free from prejudice. The main character is bisexual, and it is implied that most of his acquaintances have had at least experimental relations with members of both sexes. Several forms of birth control are also commonplace, encouraged by the government, and freely discussed.

For people who do not want to bother with social interaction, there is the fornixator, a device that supplies sexual pleasure on demand by direct stimulation of the brain's pleasure centers. The fornixator is technically illegal, but tolerated by the government because its users are happy, never demand anything else, and usually do not procreate.

Two new sets of customs have arisen which profoundly influence the story. By tradition, everyone has a Naming Day when they are grown, at which point they select a name which reflects their outlook on life, their chosen profession, or the way they want others to see them. The second change derives from the so-called "Panamorite" religion, which features total sexual freedom including oral sex between parents and their children. One source of frustration for the main character is his mother's decision to "cut him off" from intimate physical contact, a situation made worse by her becoming morbidly obese, which is not unusual in this society.

== Plot summary ==
The story revolves around the relationship between a young artist, who has taken the name Chibiabos Elgreco Winnegan, and the man he calls "Grandpa Winnegan" (actually his mother's great-great-grandfather), who hides inside the apartments that "Chib" shares with his mother in the community of Ellay. Grandpa is in hiding from the government, and most people think of him as having pulled off some huge swindle in the past. In fact, he was a successful businessman whose workers were highly paid and very content, much more so than the average recipient of the "purple wage". The resentment which this caused motivated the "gummint" to close down his business, whereupon he managed to steal twenty billion dollars, which has never been found, and (apparently) died. A Federal Agent calling himself "Falco Accipiter" has resolved to hunt down the money at all costs, and is harassing Chib.

Throughout the narrative we are treated to extracts from Grandpa's unpublished manuscript, How I Screwed Uncle Sam & Other Private Ejaculations. In these writings, he describes society and muses on human foibles. He seems particularly fond of James Joyce, and this is a clue to the story's resolution.

Chib is preparing for a new art show. He needs to win a grant to continue painting, otherwise he will have to take forced migration and live in another society, a practice by governments to prevent populations from becoming insular. Chib's own community is host to forcibly migrated Arabs, who belong to the strict Wahhabi sect of Islam. Chib wants to woo the daughter of one of these families, much to the disgust of her relatives.

Standing between Chib and the grant is the one-eyed critic Rex Luscus, who took his name from "Inter caecos regnat luscus", better known as "In the country of the blind, the one-eyed man is King". The price of Rex's approval, which will make Chib famous, is sexual favors. Chib's art is controversial. He depicts religious scenes using a three-dimensional technique which presents different views, some of which are blasphemous comments on religion and humanity.

Like most young people, Chib and his friends enjoy rebellion for its own sake. They pretend to plot terrorist attacks when they know they are under surveillance. Such talk is so common that the listening authorities treat it with contempt. The police are laughable by 20th century standards. Dressed in fur-like characters from The Wizard of Oz they use electric tricycles no faster than golf carts, which nonetheless are equipped with sirens "to warn the bad guys they are coming". They have shock-sticks and guns which fire "choke-gas pellets".

Chib's exhibition dissolves into violence as his friend Omar Runic declaims an improvised poem in tribute to Chib's latest work. This is also common, particularly as the "fido" reporters are always keen to stir up trouble, and the artists hate the critics. One artist, a science fiction writer named Huga Wells-Erb Heinsturbury, starts the riot by attacking a reporter from Time magazine, now a government-run news agency which has kept the attitudes of the original corporation, including a deep hatred of science fiction. Chib smashes his painting, a blasphemous Nativity scene, into Rex Luscus's stomach. Suddenly he receives a message from Grandpa. Falco Accipiter has broken into the apartment and found his hiding place.

Grandpa is dead by the time Chib reaches home. He apparently died of shock. In his hand is the last of his "Private Ejaculations". A devout Catholic himself, according to this last note he comforts himself in an atheist world with the thought that profound hatred of religion means that people still believe God exists, otherwise they would not hate him so.

Chib and his mother attend a reverse funeral, where the coffin which supposedly contained Grandpa's body is dug up. As it is opened, there is an explosion, which scatters the stolen billions into the air and sends up a banner announcing "Winnegan's Fake!". Grandpa has cocked a final snook at the "gummint" from beyond the grave.

Chib is handed a note by a man acting for Grandpa's estate. The note simply says that Chib must abandon Ellay, leave his mother, and break free so he can paint from love, not out of hatred.

== Characters ==
- Chibiabos Elgreco Winnegan, a young artist and confidant of Grandpa Winnegan. In the poem Hiawatha, "the gentle Chibiabos" is Hiawatha's close friend.
- Grandpa Winnegan, whose original name was Finnegan. He claimed to be a descendant of the "Tim Finnegan" whose death and resurrection are celebrated in the song "Finnegan's Wake". He is the last bastion of individual enterprise in the mechanized nanny-state. His adopted last name is a pun on "Win again".
- Mama Winnegan, Chib's mother who spends her life drinking, eating, and playing poker with disreputable friends. She may know that Grandpa is hiding in their apartments, but pretends not to.
- Falco Accipter, a "gummint" agent who is determined to track down Grandpa's stolen money, and perhaps Grandpa himself.
- Rex Luscus, one-eyed art critic whose eye is mostly on Chib's body. He could have his other eye replaced, but he claims that no art he sees makes it worth his while to have binocular vision.
- The "Young Radishes", Chib's circle of friends who play at plotting revolution and defying authority through their art. Their name is a pun on "radical", meaning either a root (as in root vegetable or radish) or a person who advocates drastic change in society.
  - Omar Bacchylides Runic, a poet with a talent for extemporizing, and Chib's occasional lover. His improvised poems tend to inflame people to riot.
  - Benedictine Serinus Melba, a singer who claims to be pregnant by Chib. Thanks to an incident with a can of spermicide, Chib finds this hard to believe.
  - Rousseau Red Hawk, who affects the persona of a "Red Indian" even though he is a Jewish philosopher who feels intellectually deprived in the nature reserves.
  - Huga Wells-Erb Heinsturbury, a science fiction writer whose unwieldy adopted name is derived from the names Hugo Gernsback, H. G. Wells, Edgar Rice Burroughs (E.R.B), Robert A. Heinlein, Theodore Sturgeon and Ray Bradbury.
- Dionysus Gobrinus and Madame Trismegista, owners and proprietors of The Private Universe, where Chib and his friends hang out. Gobrinus is a former mathematician. Madame Trismegista is a fortune teller, but Gobrinus somehow believes that she controls fate through the stars via the cards she reads.
- Pinkerton Legrand, a gummint agent monitoring the Young Radishes.

== Influences ==
In his afterword to the story, Farmer mentions the Triple Revolution memo, a document sent to United States President Lyndon Johnson in 1964, with policy suggestions for the future of the nation in the face of "three separate and mutually reinforcing revolutions." These were identified as "The Cybernation Revolution," (massive automatic production, requiring progressively less human labor), "The Weaponry Revolution" (the development of new forms of weaponry which can obliterate civilization), and "The Human Rights Revolution" (a universal demand for human rights).

The source of Rex Luscus' name is described in the story as the quote, "In the country of the blind, the one-eyed man is King". The original phrase is "In regione caecorum, rex est luscus," from Desiderius Erasmus Roterodamus' Collectanea Adagiorum. This is likely to also be a reference to the early SF writer H. G. Wells' story, "The Country of the Blind" (1904) in which a sighted man finds himself in a literal country of the blind, plots to use his advantage to rule them, but fails because his ability is not appreciated by the population.

== Reception ==
"Riders of the Purple Wage" is viewed as an example of modernism in New Wave fiction involving Joycean stream-of-consciousness. Critic Algis Budrys asserted that the work demonstrates how to "write more and more about less and less. Farmer can show you how to pile it higher and higher... [an] exercise in self-indulgence".

== Related works ==
A short story called "The Oögenesis of Bird City" (1971) describes an earlier time when the arcologies and the egg-houses were being introduced to society. Of particular interest is a mention in the story that "integration" of communities was a failure and the technology could be used to allow people to dwell "among their own kind".

== See also ==
- Sex and sexuality in speculative fiction
