= Jesus on Mars =

1979 science fiction novel by Philip José Farmer

- First edition cover (publ. Pinnacle Books)
- Author: Philip José Farmer
- Genre: Science fiction
- Publisher: Pinnacle Books
- Publication date: September 1, 1979
- ISBN: 978-0-523-40184-3

Jesus on Mars is a 1979 science fiction novel by American writer Philip José Farmer, set on Mars and involving an alien civilization. It makes social commentary on a just society and on religious belief.

== Plot summary ==
An unmanned scientific probe sent to Mars discovers an alien artifact. A follow-up robotic explorer lands and verifies that an enormous alien ship is partially buried on Mars. So a crewed expedition is sent to explore this apparently abandoned alien ship. The expedition members are captured and taken underground to the habitat occupied by a combined society of humans living harmoniously with the alien Krsh.

The expedition learns that, in previous millennia, the technologically advanced Krsh were won over to the religion of the humans. This society practices Judaism but accepts Jesus as their Messiah. Included in their Bible is the Book of Matthias which is the testament written by Judas Iscariot. However, unlike mainstream Christianity, this society views Jesus as a man and not as God (see Nicene Creed).

Originally, the Krsh had arrived at Earth on an exploratory mission. To study humans, the Krsh had offered to bring injured humans to their spaceship for medical treatment. Then, the ship was attacked by another alien species which is especially hostile and xenophobic. Even though the attack was repelled and the ship of the xenophobic aliens was destroyed, the Krsh's own ship was damaged. So they landed on Mars to hide from more potential hostility which never arrived. During the years of camouflage, the Krsh and humans crew joined together into a unified society.

Halfway through the novel, we learn that Jesus himself miraculously arrived among these people almost two thousand years earlier and had been living with them ever since. The proximity of Jesus is overwhelming and convincing both in terms of concrete, scientifically verifiable miracles as well as a strong visceral presence. This proximity convinces even the scientifically advanced Krsh. Also, three of the four crew members accept this Jesus and convert to this hybrid form of Judaism and Christianity. The fourth crew member, an atheist and the only female crew member, commits suicide. She is subsequently resurrected using advanced technology but not before she suffers brain damage that erases much of her personality.

Towards the end of the novel, Jesus leads a flotilla of spaceships back to Earth in a reenactment of the Second Coming. Although desiring peaceful interaction and offering immortality and boundless manna, they are prepared for hostile action. As can be expected, Jesus is accused of being the Antichrist.

Such doubts afflict Richard Orme who is the astronaut leading the crewed expedition from Earth. In the penultimate chapter, Orme wavers on his conversion and submission to this Martian Jesus. He then prepares to assassinate the Jesus but throws himself upon a grenade from another assassin so as to save Jesus. In the final chapter, he awakens naked and disoriented to discover that he has been resurrected by Jesus while the world media looked on. Then, Orme reaffirms his commitment and the novel ends abruptly with a sense of the years of impending struggle against the forces of evil.

== Reception ==
Greg Costikyan reviewed Jesus on Mars in Ares Magazine #1. Costikyan commented that "Jesus on Mars would be brilliant if it were written by a novice; but from Farmer, one expects better things."

== Reviews ==
- Review by Darrell Schweitzer (1979) in Science Fiction Review, November 1979
- Review by James Patrick Kelly (1979) in Science Fiction & Fantasy Book Review, December 1979
- Review by George H. Scheetz (1979) in Science Fiction & Fantasy Book Review, December 1979
- Review by Steve Brown (1980) in Heavy Metal, January 1980
- Review (in French) by Claude Eckerman (1981) in Futurs (2ème série), #3
- Review by Joseph Nicholas (1982) in Paperback Inferno, Volume 6, Number 3
- Review (in German) by Andreas Decker (1984) in Science Fiction Times, November 1984

== General and cited references ==
- Jesus on Mars (paperback, Pinnacle Press, 1979) ISBN 0-523-40184-1. This edition is now out of print.
- Jesus on Mars (paperback, Panther Books, 1982) ISBN 0-586-05308-5.
- It has also been translated in six other languages and published abroad.
