= A Barnstormer in Oz =

Novel by Philip José Farmer

A Barnstormer in Oz: A Rationalization and Extrapolation of the Split-Level Continuum
- First paperback edition
- Author: Philip José Farmer
- Cover artist: Don Ivan Punchatz
- Language: English
- Series: The Oz Books
- Genre: Fantasy
- Published: 1982 (Phantasia Press)
- Publication place: United States
- Media type: Print (hardback)
- Pages: 278
- ISBN: 0-932096-18-2
- OCLC: 11336024
- Dewey Decimal: 813/.54 19
- LC Class: PS3556.A72 B3 1982

A Barnstormer in Oz: A Rationalization and Extrapolation of the Split-Level Continuum is a 1982 novel by Philip José Farmer. It is a sequel to L. Frank Baum's The Wonderful Wizard of Oz, set some thirty years after, which disregards Baum's own sequels and those of others. The protagonist is Hank Stover, a World War I aviator and the son of Dorothy, who finds himself in Oz when his plane gets lost in a green cloud over Kansas in 1923. The novel was written for adults rather than children, and includes elements of sex and violence.

== Plot ==
After his plane flies through a mysterious green cloud, Hank finds himself in an Oz on the brink of a civil war. He encounters Queen Glinda the Good of Quadling, who is at war with Erakna, the new Wicked Witch. In the world of the Farmer novel, the events of The Wonderful Wizard of Oz were based on real events. Baum had been a newspaper reporter in Aberdeen, South Dakota around the time Dorothy was transported to Oz; he interviewed her and later used his notes as the basis for the first novel. All subsequent novels by Baum were products of Baum's imagination (although some "real" names made it into The Marvelous Land of Oz, the only Baum Oz sequel in the public domain at the time). In Barnstormer, Dorothy has made only one visit to Oz; when Hank Stover arrives, the Scarecrow still rules the Emerald City, just as he did at the end of Baum's first Oz book.

Farmer treats Oz as a parallel universe, and attempts explanations of some of the fantastic elements including magic and talking animals.

== Internal errors and oddities ==
- In chapter 11, Hank has a thought about the Bible belt, an expression unknown before 1924.
- The novel's internal chronology indicates that Dorothy was born in 1882, and her son Hank was born in 1897 or 1898. This implies a child marriage, which was not uncommon in parts of America at the time.

== Significance ==
Literary scholars Kent Drummond, Susan Aronstein, and Terri L. Rittenburg have called the novel "the first instance of Dark Oz" and "the beginning of stand-alone, full-blown literary re-consumptions of Oz", specifying that it introduced the concept of "revisionist Oz, an Oz that purports to offer consumers the 'real Oz', the truth behind the myth."

Farmer's earlier "biographies" Tarzan Alive and Doc Savage: His Apocalyptic Life had made similarly revisionist examinations of older works of fiction, which Farmer put in the context of his Wold Newton family setting.

== Reception ==
Opinions of Farmer's contribution to the literature of Oz span the entire critical spectrum; Jack Zipes called the novel "splendid", while Baum biographer Katharine Rogers considered it "revision to the point of debasement." Publishers Weekly considered it to be "done with almost no whimsy or humor" and "though ambitious, (...) not one of [Farmer's] better books;" In Analog Science Fiction and Fact, Thomas Easton opined that the novel "will surely appeal best to those who remember Oz fondly. Others may well find it a touch too cute."

== See also ==
Other works with a similar "dark, revisionist Oz" theme:

- The Wicked Years (1995-ongoing), a series of novels by Gregory Maguire.
- Emerald City (2017), a television serial.
