= The Lovers (Farmer novella and novel) =

- Short story by Philip José Farmer
- Language: English
- Genre: Science fiction

Publication
- Published in: Startling Stories
- Publication type: Pulp magazine
- Publication date: 1952, 1961, 1979
- Publication place: United States
- Media type: Print: periodical (later expanded twice as paperback books)

Chronology
- Series: Sturch
—	"Moth and Rust" (1953)

The Lovers is a science-fiction novella by American writer Philip José Farmer (1918–2009), first published in August 1952 in Startling Stories. In 1961, the work was expanded and published as a stand-alone softcover novel by Ballantine Books. In 1979, it was reissued by Ballantine as a Del Rey Classic in a final revised ("definitive") edition. Hailed by the science fiction community as a bold and pioneering exploration of religion and sexuality, the original version won Farmer the Hugo Award for "Best New SF Author or Artist" in 1953.

== Plot summary ==
In the 31st century, the military starship Gabriel has arrived at the distant planet Ozagen. Its all-male crew represents the Haijac Union, where the "American" language is spoken. The Union is one of three powers dominating the planet Earth (the others are the Malay Federation and the Israeli Republics) since the Apocalyptic War, hundreds of years ago, decimated the Earth's population through bio-warfare. The Union is an extreme theocracy and religious tyranny in which everyone (including spouses) is expected to inform on one another for the slightest infractions. The true mission of the Gabriel, which is secret, may be "gunboat diplomacy" or worse. The Ozagenians – a sentient, but technologically inferior, arthropod (insect-like) race – are known to the Earthmen contemptuously as Wogglebugs, or Wogs. (This is an explicit reference to L. Frank Baum's character Professor Woggle-Bug, who these aliens are said to resemble.) One crew member on the Gabriel, linguist Hal Yarrow, is happy for a mission that has allowed him to escape an unhappy marriage, but Yarrow finds that the worst of Earth has followed him in the form of Pornsen, his personal minder ("Guardian Angel"), vigilant for any evidence of sinful deeds or even wrong thinking. Conditioned by a lifetime of submission, Yarrow attempts to lose himself in the study of the Ozagen language. On a visit to ancient ruins built by long vanished mammalian humanoids, he encounters Jeannette, an attractive and (seemingly) almost-human fugitive – a remnant of her all but extinct race. For Yarrow's oppressive, puritanical society, unconsecrated contact with any female is forbidden – and the love that he develops for this "alien" is beyond unimaginable. Yarrow covertly harbors Jeannette in his lodgings while secretly spying on the amiably tolerant Wogs. He also conceals from his Wog hosts the real purpose of the Earthmen's visit, which includes not just colonization, but genocide. Ozagen and its Wog inhabitants, however, are harboring many unexpected secrets from their villainous visitors.

== Religion in The Lovers ==
The religion of the Haijac Union derives from Isaac Sigman, a messianic figure of a thousand years prior to the events of the story. Sigmanism is the belief system of the "Sturch" (state-church) of the Haijac Union. Although not overly emphasized, it is clear from the novel that Sigmanism is an elaboration, or variant, of Judaism; a list of Sigman's Works includes the Pre-Torah and the Western Talmud. (Farmer confirmed this in an article describing the origin of The Lovers where he referred to his fictional society as "neo-Judaic".) A central tenet of Sigmanism is that all actions taken by individuals and all events that befall them, even seemingly accidental ones, are intentional, whether consciously or unconsciously. This is an extreme assertion of the agency of free will. Thoughts and actions that run contrary to the authority of the Sturch are termed "unreal" and any desire for such actions are considered desires for a "pseudofuture", and are always punished whenever detected. Sigman was a devotee of the "Serialism" of British engineer and philosopher J. W. Dunne (1875–1949) and the Sturch devotes considerable time and resources to "dunnology" on a mathematical level. (Dunne – the real person, as opposed to the fictional Sigman – believed that he experienced precognitive dreams. He proposed that a person's experience of time as linear is an illusion brought about by human consciousness. He argued that past, present and future were continuous in a higher-dimensional reality and we only experience them sequentially because of our mental perception of them. He went further, proposing an infinite regress of higher time dimensions inhabited by the conscious observer, which he called "serial time.") Sigman is known to devotees as "the Forerunner" and has a brother, known as Jude Changer as well as "the Backrunner", who is a counter or foil to Sigman. What the Backrunner mischievously disrupts will eventually be set right by the Forerunner. These two brothers are the only humans who can time travel "objectively" (physically) as opposed to "subjectively" (mentally), the latter being available to anyone through dreaming. Sigman is not believed to have ever died, but rather travels forward and backward through time at will as well as physically anywhere in the universe. In the novel (1961 version), Yarrow's Wog friend Fobo vehemently points out the many logical fallacies and contradictions of Sigmanism.

== Reception ==
According to The Encyclopedia of Science Fiction, the novella was "originally rejected by John W. Campbell Jr. of Astounding Science-Fiction and H.L. Gold of Galaxy Science Fiction", but "burst onto the sf scene" and "gained instant acclaim when it did appear" in Startling Stories.... "It concerned Xenobiology, Parasitism and Sex, an explosive mixture, certainly for the Genre SF of that era; transgressive mixtures of this sort would feature repeatedly in Farmer's best work."

In 2010, Gary K. Wolfe hailed The Lovers as "one of the most spectacular debuts in the history of American science fiction".

== See also ==
- Philip José Farmer bibliography
- Insectoids in science fiction
