= Night of Light =

1966 novel by Philip José Farmer

- Cover of the first edition
- Author: Philip José Farmer
- Language: English
- Genre: Science Fiction
- Publisher: Berkley Medallion Books
- Publication date: June 1966
- Website: philipjosefarmer.com

Night of Light is a science fiction novel by American writer Philip José Farmer. A shorter version was published in June 1957 in The Magazine of Fantasy & Science Fiction. The expanded version was first published in 1966 by Berkley Medallion with copyright reserved to the author. In 2009 it was reprinted by Subterranean Press in the collection The Other in the Mirror. It has been cited as an influence on the Jimi Hendrix psychedelic rock song "Purple Haze" (1967).

== Plot summary ==
Once every seven years, a world in orbit around a binary star is bathed in a bizarre radiance that rearranges physical reality. Most of the planet's inhabitants choose to sleep for the entire two-week period, often using a special medicine to do so. Only mystics, newcomers, and devotees to the planet's bizarre religion are willing to stay awake and endure the two weeks of brilliance, where things materialize out of thin air. According to their religion, people undergo an unpredictable change, and many actually die. The good become better, and the bad become worse. One woman's husband metamorphosed into a tree. Another person was chased down streets by statues that came to life. But facing the brilliance is also a rite of passage if you must develop as a being inclined towards acts of goodness, or a being inclined towards acts of evil. It is during those two weeks that the good are pitted against the bad, and it is also a time when their living god must face his successor.

To help in the conversion effort, Catholic missionaries have been sent to the planet to help reconcile the planet's religion with their own universal faith. The only problem is that the planet's religion appears to be spreading across the stars.
