= Traitor to the Living =

1973 novel by Philip José Farmer

- First edition cover
- Author: Philip José Farmer
- Cover artist: Hans Ulrich & Ute Osterwalder
- Language: English
- Series: Herald Childe
- Genre: Science fiction
- Publisher: Ballantine Books
- Publication date: 1973
- Publication place: United States
- Media type: Print
- ISBN: 0-345-23613-0
- OCLC: 2210396
- Preceded by: Blown: or Sketches Among the Ruins of My Mind

Traitor to the Living (1973) is a science fiction novel by American writer Philip José Farmer. The story follows Herald Childe, a private detective, who is also the lead character in two earlier Farmer novels published as pornography by Essex House. In this non-erotic novel, the lead character is clearly Herald Childe, but it follows the events of a never-written third book which left Childe amnesiac.

== Reception ==
Lester del Rey found the novel to be "fascinating, and a good adventure thriller." Edgar L. Chapman described it as "a novel of serious intrigue, quite conventional in its treatment of sex", but faulted it because it "not only lacks humor, but does not create much suspense either."

== Sources ==
- Traitor to the Living (1973) ISBN 0-345-23613-0
