= Flesh (Farmer novel) =

1960 novel by Philip José Farmer

- Author: Philip José Farmer
- Genre: Science fiction
- Publisher: Beacon
- Publication date: January 1, 1960

Flesh is an American science fiction novel written by Philip José Farmer. Originally released in 1960, it was Farmer's second novel-length publication, after The Green Odyssey. Flesh features many sexual themes, as is typical of Farmer's earliest work.

The novel was influenced by the Robert Graves book on mythology, The White Goddess.

== Overview ==
In Flesh, Peter Stagg and a group of astronauts leave Earth in the 21st century. Due to the benefits of hypersleep, they return to the planet eight hundred years later, in CE 2860. They find a strange world, inhabited by pagan cultists and bizarre societies decorating a scorched, rocky landscape, except for the predominantly fertile eastern coast of the former United States and Karelians, European pirates from the remnants of Finland. Inducted into the mostly female "Elk" group, Stagg has antlers grafted onto his skull and is christened the "Sunhero". In that role, he becomes a sexual slave, forced to engage in intercourse with virtually every member of the group, especially virgins, although he balks at the "Pants-Elfs", a gay community from what was known as Pennsylvania in the 22nd century. Society is dominated by goddess worshipping cults centred on the "Great White Mother" known as Columbia, as well as her adolescent daughter Virginia and the death-bringer crone goddess Alba. The primary thrust of the plot is Stagg's internal dialogue, ruminating on the moral, ethical, spiritual, and physical implications of his actions. However, when he truly falls in love for the first time, the object of his affections refuses to give in to his physical advances. Ultimately, Stagg, his newfound lover Mary Casey, the remaining members of his crew and chosen female partners and children escape from the neopagan-dominated primitivist Earth once more, en route to an inhabitable planet in Vega's planetary system. However, a denouement suggests that this may have been intended by the elderly priestesses who control this matriarchal society.

== Reaction and analysis ==
The book was met with an indifferent reception by critics. While most enjoyed Farmer's writing style, they often felt that the plot was simply a weak excuse to string together lurid depictions of graphic sex. The revised and expanded edition published eight years after the original release was met with somewhat more praise, largely due to the perceived greater depth of the plot.
