= The Adventure of the Peerless Peer =

1974 adventure pastiche novel written by Philip Jose Farmer

- First edition
- Author: Philip Jose Farmer
- Language: English
- Genre: Adventure, mystery
- Published: 1974
- Publisher: The Aspen Press
- Publication place: United States
- Media type: Novel
- Pages: 208
- ISBN: 0-915230-06-2 (first edition)

The Adventure of the Peerless Peer is a 1974 adventure pastiche novel written by Philip Jose Farmer, writing as Dr. John H. Watson, about the meeting of Sherlock Holmes and Tarzan. This was one of several works Farmer wrote that involved Tarzan.

== Plot ==
The story is presented as a lost manuscript of Watson's, edited by Farmer. On orders from his older brother Mycroft, Sherlock Holmes and Dr. Watson travel to Africa and form an alliance with the titular peer, Lord Greystoke a.k.a. Tarzan, to hunt down the nefarious Von Bork (from "His Last Bow") and stop his deadly new weapon.

Also mentioned:

- 6th Duke of Holdernesse (The Adventure of the Priory School)
- Sir Henry Merrivale
- Gideon Fell as a former student of Watson's, now practicing medicine.
- flight lieutenant John Drummond, adopted aon of current duke, possibly Ace Drummond
- The Spider (Wentworth)
- Handley Page Type O aircraft
- The Shadow (Kentov)
- Sikorsky Ilya Muromets aircraft
- L 9 aircraft
- Pemberley, now residence of Duke of Holdernesse
- Peter Carey (The Adventure of Black Peter)
- Kingdom Zu-Vendis
- Allan Quatermain
- Sir Henry Curtis

== Reissues ==
Due to copyright issues, it was rewritten as "The Adventure of the Three Madmen"—with Mowgli from The Jungle Book replacing Tarzan—in The Grand Adventure collection (1984).

In 2008, with permission of the Burroughs estate, it was once again published with its original text and title in Venus on the Half-Shell and Others (Burton, Mich.: Subterranean Press, January 2008).

It was reissued by Titan Books in 2011 (ISBN 0-857-68120-6) as part of The Further Adventures of Sherlock Holmes series with Tarzan and the original title restored. It has the abbreviated title of The Peerless Peer.
