= Philip José Farmer =

American science fiction and fantasy writer (1918–2009)

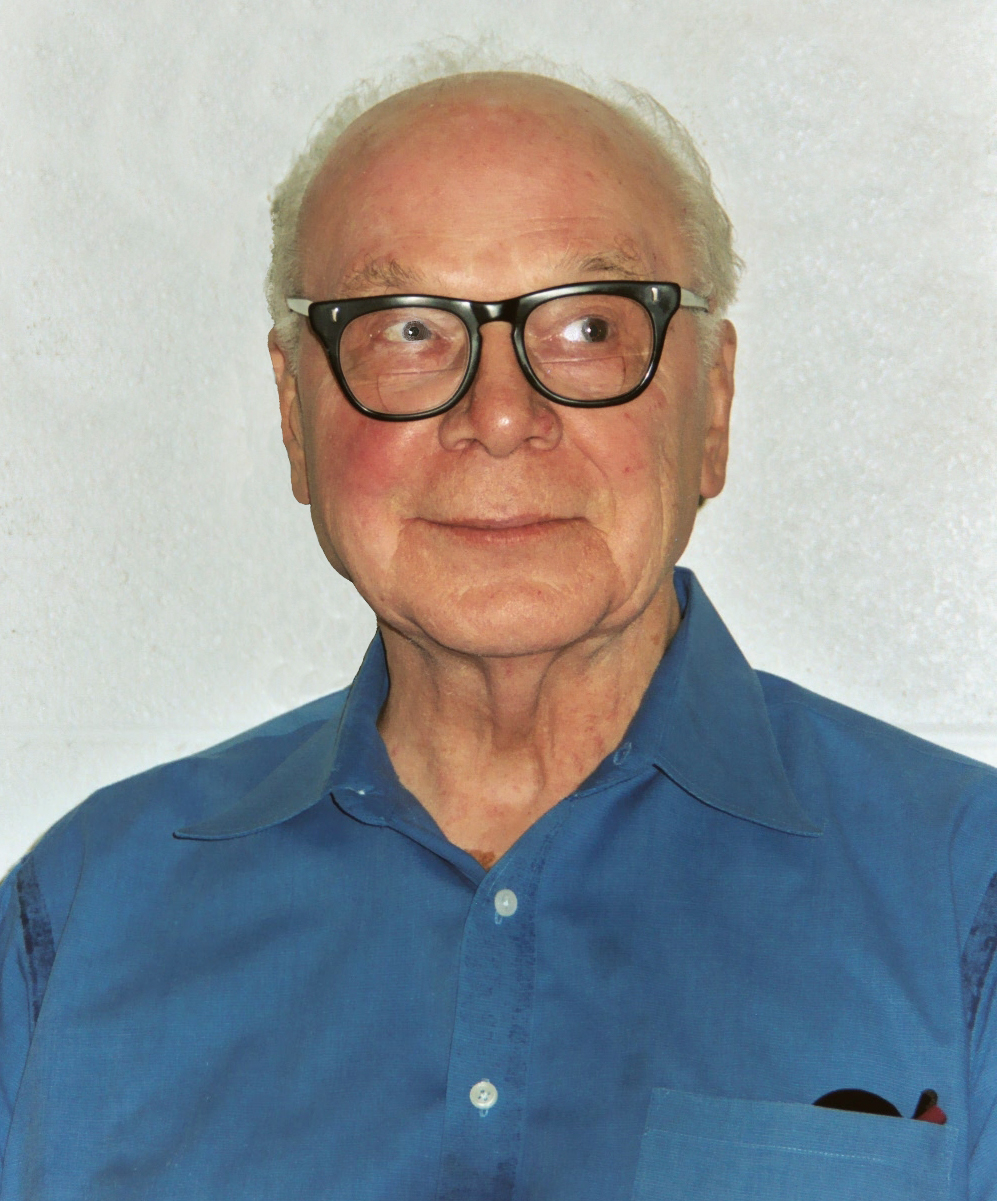
- Farmer in 2002
- Born: January 26, 1918; North Terre Haute, Indiana, U.S.
- Died: February 25, 2009 (aged 91); Peoria, Illinois, U.S.
- Education: Peoria High School; Bradley University
- Occupations: Novelist, short story writer
- Spouse: Bette V. Andre (m. 1941)
- Children: 2
- Writing career
- Pen name: more than a dozen (below)
- Period: c. 1952–2009
- Genres: Fantasy, science fiction
- Website: www.pjfarmer.com

Philip José Farmer (January 26, 1918 – February 25, 2009) was an American author known for his science fiction and fantasy novels and short stories.

Farmer is best known for two sequences of novels, the World of Tiers (1965–93) and Riverworld (1971–83) series. He is noted for the pioneering use of sexual and religious themes in his work, his fascination for, and reworking of, the lore of celebrated pulp heroes, and occasional tongue-in-cheek pseudonymous works written as if by fictional characters. Farmer often mixed real and classic fictional characters and worlds and real and fake authors as epitomized by his Wold Newton family books, which tie classic fictional characters together as real people and blood relatives resulting from an alien conspiracy. Such works as The Other Log of Phileas Fogg (1973) and Doc Savage: His Apocalyptic Life (1973) are early examples of literary mashup novels.

Literary critic Leslie Fiedler compared Farmer to Ray Bradbury, describing both as "provincial American eccentrics" who "strain at the classic limits of the [science fiction] form," but found Farmer distinctive for his capacity "to be at once naive and sophisticated in his odd blending of theology, pornography, and adventure."

== Biography ==
=== Youth and education ===
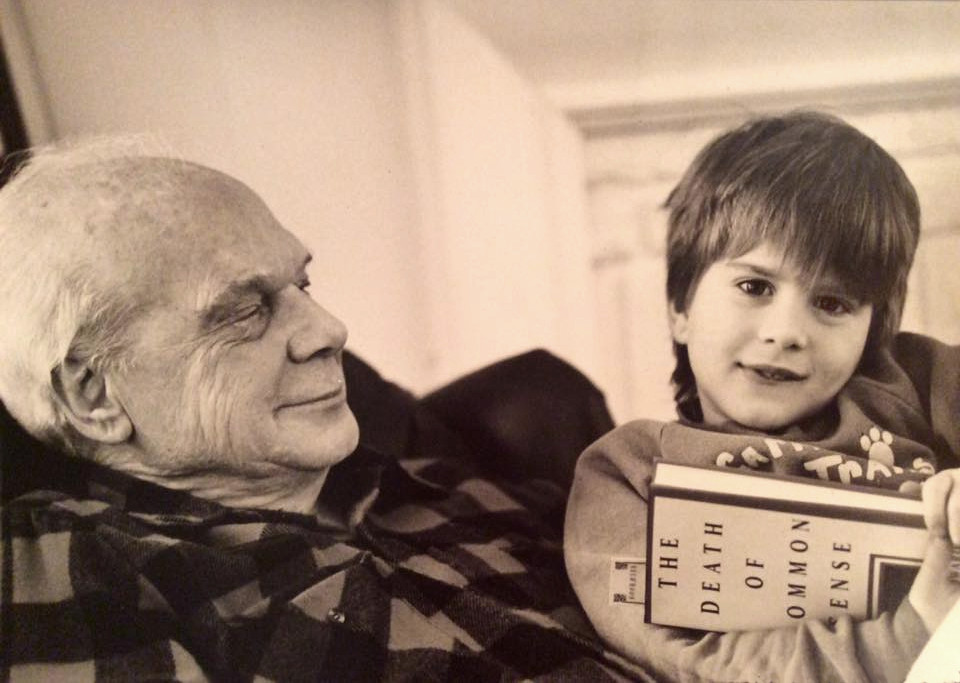
Farmer and his great-grandson in 1995

Farmer was born in North Terre Haute, Indiana. His parents gave him the middle name "Josie", from his paternal grandmother Josephine, but Farmer later changed it himself to “José” as he resented the woman's name and wanted to lend color to what he felt was an otherwise rather drab name. Farmer grew up in Peoria, Illinois, where he attended Peoria High School. His father was a civil engineer and a supervisor for the local power company. A voracious reader as a boy, Farmer said he resolved to become a writer in the fourth grade. He underwent basic religious training in the Church of Christ, Scientist (Christian Science) as a child, which he later characterized as a "peculiar background" for a science fiction writer. He became an agnostic at the age of 14, and ultimately an atheist, though not, he said, indifferent to religion. At age 23, in 1941, he married Bette V. Andre, remaining a couple throughout his life; together, they had a son and a daughter. After washing out of flight training in World War II, he went to work in a local steel mill. He later continued his education, however, earning a bachelor's degree in English from Bradley University in 1950 at the age of 32.

=== Early career ===
Farmer had his first literary success when his novella The Lovers was published by Samuel Mines in Startling Stories, August 1952. It features a sexual relationship between a human and an extraterrestrial. He won a Hugo Award for Best New SF Author or Artist in 1953, the first of three Hugo awards he won in his career. Thus encouraged, he quit his job to become a full-time writer, entered a publisher's contest, and promptly won first prize for a novel, Owe for the Flesh, that contained the germ of his later Riverworld series. But the book was not published and Farmer did not get the $4,000 prize money that was supposed to go to the winner. Literary success did not translate into financial security, so he left Peoria in 1956 to launch a career as a technical writer. He spent the next 14 years working in that capacity for various defense contractors, from Syracuse, New York, to Los Angeles, while writing science fiction in his spare time.

Farmer won a second Hugo award in 1968, in the category Best Novella, for Riders of the Purple Wage, a pastiche of James Joyce's Finnegans Wake as well as a satire on a futuristic, cradle-to-grave welfare state. Reinvigorated, Farmer became a full-time writer again in 1969. Upon moving back to Peoria in 1970, he entered his most prolific period, publishing 25 books in 10 years. His novel To Your Scattered Bodies Go (a reworking of the unpublished prize-winning first novel of 20 years before) won him a third Hugo in 1972, for Best Novel.

A 1975 novel, Venus on the Half-Shell, created a stir in the larger literary community and media. It purported to be written in the first person by one "Kilgore Trout," a fictional character appearing as an underappreciated science fiction writer in several of Kurt Vonnegut's novels. The escapade did not please Vonnegut when some reviewers not only concluded that it had been written by Vonnegut himself, but that it was a worthy addition to his works. Farmer did have permission from Vonnegut to write the book, although Vonnegut later said he regretted giving permission.

=== Later years ===
Farmer had both critical champions and detractors. Leslie Fiedler proclaimed him "the greatest science fiction writer ever" and lauded his approach to storytelling as a "gargantuan lust to swallow down the whole cosmos, past, present and to come, and to spew it out again." Isaac Asimov praised Farmer as an "excellent science fiction writer; in fact, a far more skillful writer than I am...." But Christopher Lehmann-Haupt, a reviewer opposed to "that sci-fi crap," dismissed him in The New York Times in 1972 as "a humdrum toiler in the fields of science fiction."

Farmer achieved his first bestseller in 1978 with The Dark Design which surpassed 20,000 copies in hardback and 300,000 in paperback. At this time his status was secured by a six-figure contract with Berkley Books on the promise of three major new novels.

In 2001 Farmer won the World Fantasy Award for Life Achievement and the Science Fiction Writers of America made him its 19th SFWA Grand Master in the same year.

Farmer's output slowed, but he continued to be active, publishing one novel and co-authoring three others (as well as producing about 20 short stories) in his last decade. He died on February 25, 2009.

== Novel sequences ==
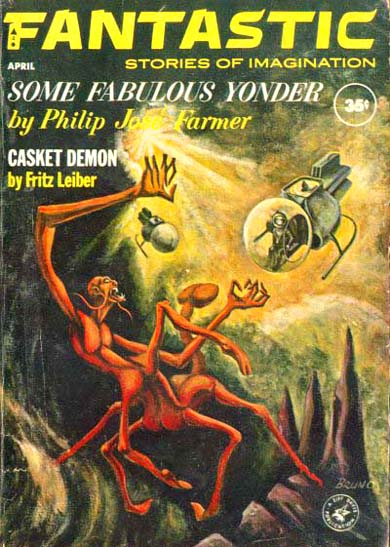
Farmer's novelette "Some Fabulous Yonder" was the cover story on the April 1963 issue of Fantastic

=== Riverworld series ===
The Riverworld series follows the adventures of such diverse characters as Richard Francis Burton, Hermann Göring, and Samuel Clemens through a bizarre afterlife in which every human ever to have lived is simultaneously resurrected along a single river valley that stretches over an entire planet. The series consists of To Your Scattered Bodies Go (1971), The Fabulous Riverboat (1971), The Dark Design (1977), The Magic Labyrinth (1980) and Gods of Riverworld (1983). Although Riverworld and Other Stories (1979) is not part of the series as such, it does include the second-published Riverworld story, which is free-standing rather than integrated into one of the novels.

The first two Riverworld books were originally published as novellas, "The Day of the Great Shout" and "The Suicide Express," and as a two-part serial, "The Felled Star," in the science fiction magazines Worlds of Tomorrow and If between 1965 and 1967. The separate novelette "Riverworld" ran in Worlds of Tomorrow in January 1966. A final pair of linked novelettes appeared in the 1990s: "Crossing the Dark River" (in Tales of Riverworld, 1992) and "Up the Bright River" (in Quest to Riverworld, 1993). Farmer introduced himself into the series as Peter Jairus Frigate (PJF).

The Riverworld series originated in a novel, Owe for the Flesh, written in one month in 1952 as a contest entry. It won the contest, but the book was left unpublished and orphaned when the prize money was misappropriated, and Farmer nearly gave up writing altogether. The original manuscript of the novel was lost, but years later Farmer reworked the material into the Riverworld magazine stories mentioned above. Eventually, a copy of a revised version of the original novel surfaced in a box in a garage and was published as River of Eternity by Phantasia Press in 1983. Farmer's introduction to this edition gives the details of how it all happened.

=== World of Tiers series ===
The series is set within a number of artificially constructed parallel universes (of which Earth is one), created tens of thousands of years ago by a race of human beings not from Earth who had achieved an advanced level of technology which gave them almost godlike power and immortality. The principal universe in which these stories take place, and from which the series derives its name, consists of an enormous tiered planet, shaped like a stack of disks or squat cylinders, of diminishing radius, one atop the other. The series follows the adventures of several of these godlike humans and several "ordinary" humans from Earth who accidentally travel to these artificial universes. (One of those "ordinary" humans was Paul Janus Finnegan [PJF], who becomes the main character in the series.) The series consists of The Maker of Universes (1965), The Gates of Creation (1966), A Private Cosmos (1968), Behind the Walls of Terra (1970), The Lavalite World (1977) and More Than Fire (1993). Roger Zelazny has mentioned that The World of Tiers was something he had in his mind when he created his Amber series. A related novel is Red Orc's Rage (1991), which does not involve the principal characters of the other books directly, but does provide background information to certain events and characters portrayed in the other novels. This is the most "psychological" of Farmer's novels.

== Literary themes ==
=== Sexuality ===
Farmer's work often handles sexual themes; some early works were notable for their ground-breaking introduction of such material to popular science fiction literature. His first published science fiction story (with one minor exception), the novella The Lovers, earned him the Hugo Award for Best New SF Author or Artist in 1953, and is critically recognized as the story that broke the taboo on sex in science fiction. (Farmer's talk at the award ceremony was entitled “Science Fiction and the Kinsey Report”.) It instantly put Farmer on the literary map.

The short story collection Strange Relations (1960) was a notable event in the genre. He was one of three persons to whom Robert A. Heinlein dedicated Stranger in a Strange Land (1961), a novel which explored sexual freedom as one of its primary themes. Moreover, Fire and the Night (1962) is a mainstream novel about an interracial romance; it features sociological and psychosexual twists. In Night of Light (1966), he devised an alien race where aliens have only one mother but several fathers, perhaps because of an unusual or untenable physical position that cannot be reached or continued by two individuals acting alone. Both Image of the Beast and the sequel Blown from 1968 to 1969 explore group sex, interplanetary travel, and interplay between fictional figures like Herald Childe and real people like Forry Ackerman. In the World of Tiers series he explores Oedipal themes. In 1982, Farmer acknowledged that most of literary critic Leslie Fiedler's "Freudian" analysis of his work is valid, but insisted that "there is also much that is Jungian and Reichian in my works".

=== Religion ===
Farmer's fiction frequently includes religious themes; he once went so far as to muse that "religion is the earliest form of science fiction". Raised in the Christian Science church, he lost his religious faith in early youth. Nevertheless, he eventually found that he was not truly indifferent to religion, but was "powerfully attracted by the Roman Catholic faith". Immortality, the afterlife and soteriology were particular theological concerns for him. "The brain, knowing that a person can't live forever in this world, rationalizes a future, or other-dimensional, world in which immortality is possible.... For me, only those stories concerned with this one vital issue are serious stories. All others, no matter how moving or profound, are mere entertainments. They do not deal with that which is our gravest concern. Without a belief in eternal life for us, the terrestrial existence is something to be gotten through with as little pain and as much pleasure as possible. If this conclusion is the triumph of irrationality over logic, so be it."

In his groundbreaking novella The Lovers (1952) he invented a fictional religion based on J. W. Dunne's "Serialism". The novel Night of Light (1957, expanded 1966) takes the rather unholy Father John Carmody on an odyssey on an alien world where spiritual forces are made manifest in the material world. In Flesh (1960) astronauts return to an Earth 800 years in their future dominated by a pagan goddess-worshiping religion. Jesus of Nazareth shows up as a character in both the Riverworld series (in the 1966 novelette "Riverworld" — but not in the novels, except for the brief mention of his death early in The Magic Labyrinth) and in the 1979 novel Jesus on Mars. Other examples of religious themes include the short stories "J.C. on the Dude Ranch", "The God Business", "The Making of Revelation, Part I", and the novels Inside, Outside (1964) — which may or may not be set in Hell — and Traitor to the Living (1973), among many others.

=== Pulp heroes ===
Many of Farmer's works rework existing characters from fiction and history, as in The Wind Whales of Ishmael (1971), a far-future sequel to Herman Melville's Moby-Dick; The Other Log of Phileas Fogg (1973), which fills in the missing time periods from Jules Verne's Around the World in Eighty Days; and A Barnstormer in Oz (1982), in which Dorothy's adult son, a pilot, flies to the Land of Oz by accident.

He has often written about the pulp heroes Tarzan and Doc Savage, or pastiches thereof: In his novel The Adventure of the Peerless Peer, Tarzan and Sherlock Holmes team up. Farmer's Lord Grandrith and Doc Caliban series portray analogues of Tarzan and Doc Savage. It consists of A Feast Unknown (1969), Lord of the Trees (1970) and The Mad Goblin (1970). Farmer has also written two mock biographies of both characters, Tarzan Alive (1972) and Doc Savage: His Apocalyptic Life (1973), which adopt the premise that the two were based on real people fictionalized by their original chroniclers, and connect them genealogically with a large number of other well-known fictional characters in a schema now known as the "Wold Newton family." Further, Farmer wrote both an authorized Doc Savage novel, Escape from Loki (1991) and an authorized Tarzan novel, The Dark Heart of Time (1999). In his 1972 novel Time's Last Gift, Farmer also explored the Tarzan theme combined with time travel, using the transparently reverse-syllabled name of "Sahhindar" for his hero (and the book's initials, TLG, as code for "Tarzan, Lord Greystoke"). A short story on this theme is "The Jungle Rot Kid on the Nod" (1968): "if William S. rather than Edgar Rice [Burroughs] had written Tarzan," Farmer also wrote Lord Tyger (1970) about a ruthless millionaire who tries to create a real Tarzan by having a child kidnapped and then brought up subject to the same tragic events which shaped Tarzan in the original books.

In his incomplete historical Khokarsa cycle — Hadon of Ancient Opar (1974) and Flight to Opar (1976) — Farmer portrayed the "lost city" of Opar, which plays an important part in the Tarzan saga, in the time of its glory as a colony city of the empire of Khokarsa. One of the books mentions a mysterious grey-eyed traveller, clearly "Sahhindar"/Tarzan.

=== Pseudonyms ===
Farmer wrote Venus on the Half-Shell (1975) under the name Kilgore Trout, a fictional author who appears in the works of Kurt Vonnegut. He had planned to write more of Trout's fictional books (notably Son of Jimmy Valentine), but Vonnegut put an end to those plans. Farmer's use of the pseudonym had caused confusion among many readers, who for some time assumed that Vonnegut was behind it; when the truth of Venus on the Half-Shell's authorship came out, Vonnegut was reported as being "not amused." In an issue of the semi-prozine The Alien Critic/Science Fiction Review, published by Richard E. Geis, Farmer claimed to have received an angry, obscenity-laden telephone call from Vonnegut about it. Thereafter Farmer wrote a number of pseudonymous "fictional author" stories, mostly for The Magazine of Fantasy and Science Fiction. These were stories whose "authors" are characters in other stories. The first such story was "by" Jonathan Swift Somers III (invented by Farmer himself in Venus on the Half-Shell but inspired by one of the dead voices of Spoon River Anthology). Later Farmer used the "Cordwainer Bird" byline, a pseudonym invented by Harlan Ellison for film and television projects from which he wished to disassociate himself, and perhaps related to the name Cordwainer Smith, a pseudonym used by Paul Linebarger.

== Awards and honors ==
Awards

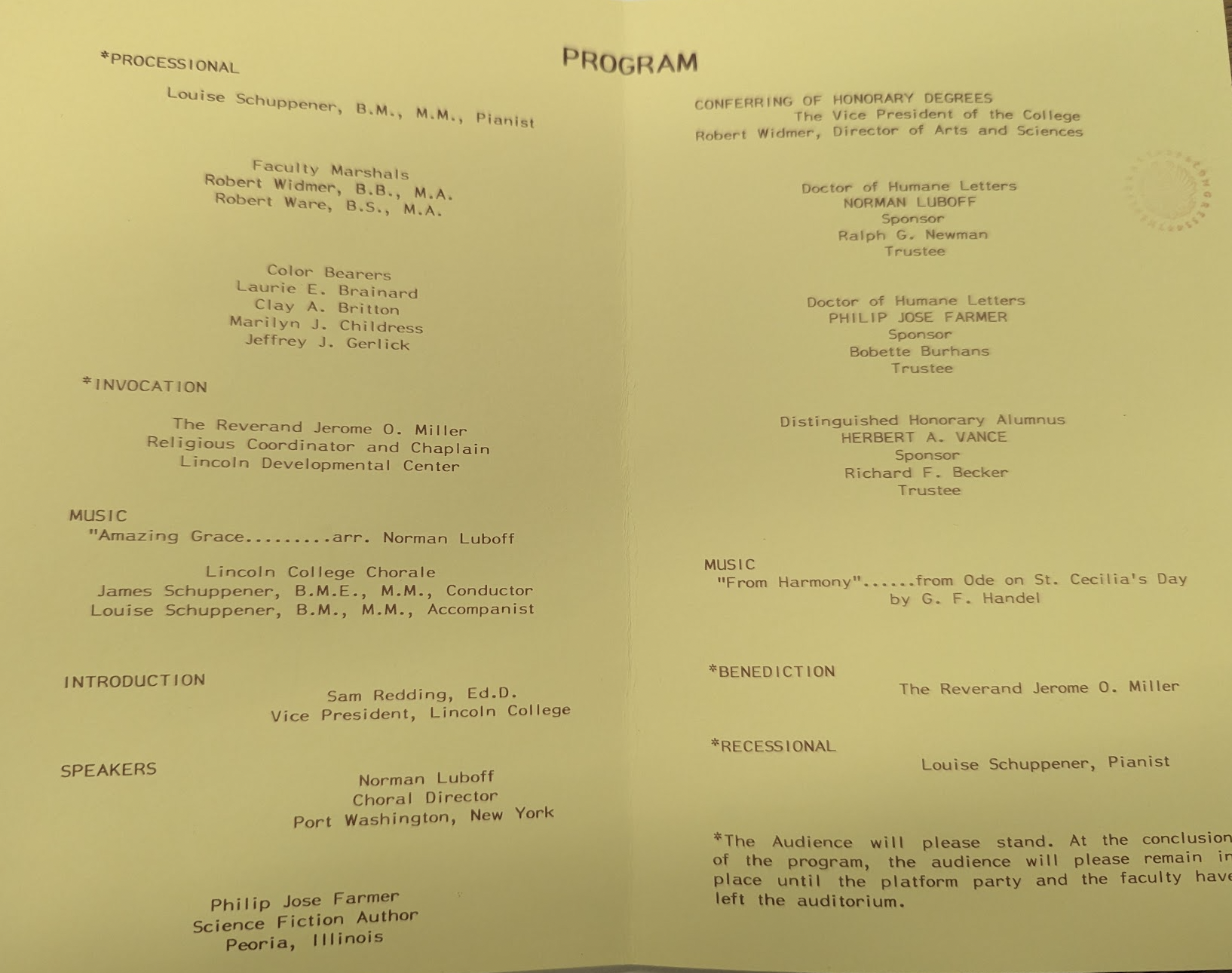
Philip José Farmer and American composer and conductor Norman Luboff were awarded honorary doctorates during Lincoln College's 117th Charter Day Convocation on February 14, 1982.

- 1953: Hugo Award for Best New SF Author or Artist, The Lovers
- 1968: Hugo Award for Best Novella, Riders of the Purple Wage
- 1972: Hugo Award for Best Novel, To Your Scattered Bodies Go
- 1982: Honorary doctorate awarded by Lincoln College
- 2000: Damon Knight Memorial Grand Master Award, lifetime achievement in fantasy and SF
- 2001: World Fantasy Award for Life Achievement
- 2003: Forry Award for Lifetime Achievement, presented by the Los Angeles Science Fantasy Society

Runners-up, etc.

- 1960: Hugo Award for Best Short Story, "The Alley Man"
- 1961: Hugo Award for Best Short Story, "Open to Me, My Sister"
- 1966: Hugo Award for Best Short Story, "The Day of the Great Shout"
- 1967: Nebula Award for Best Novella, Riders of the Purple Wage
- 1972: Locus Award for Best Science Fiction Novel, To Your Scattered Bodies Go
- 1974: Nebula Award for Best Short Story, "After King Kong Fell"

== Bibliography ==
In a writing career spanning more than 60 years (1946–2008), Farmer published almost 60 novels, over 100 short stories and novellas (many expanded or combined into novels), two "fictional biographies" and numerous essays, articles and ephemera in fan publications.

== See also ==
- Dungeon series
- Riverworld (2003 film)
- Riverworld (2010 film)
- Wold Newton family

== General and cited sources ==
- Brizzi, Mary (Mary Turzillo). Reader's Guide to Philip José Farmer, Starmont House, Mercer Island, WA., (Starmont Reader's Guides to Contemporary Science Fiction and Fantasy Authors series, No. 3, ed. Roger C. Schlobin) ISBN 0-916732-05-3, 1981.
- Carey, Christopher Paul. "The Grand Master of Peoria: Philip José Farmer's Immortal Legacy". The Zone. Archived from the original on February 6, 2007.
- Farmer, Philip José (1983). River of Eternity. Huntington Woods, Michigan: Phantasia Press. ISBN 0-932096-28-X.
- Heinlein, Robert A. (1991). Stranger in a Strange Land. New York: New York: Ace/Putnam. ISBN 0-399-13586-3.
- Merrick, Helen (2003). John Clute; Peter Nicholls (eds.). The Cambridge Companion to Science Fiction. Cambridge University Press. ISBN 0-521-81626-2.
- The Official Philip José Farmer Home Page
