= Boss Fight Books =

American book publisher

- Founded: June 2013; 13 years ago
- Founder: Gabe Durham
- Country of origin: United States
- Headquarters location: Los Angeles
- Distribution: Simon & Schuster
- Nonfiction topics: video games
- Official website: bossfightbooks.com

Boss Fight Books is a Los Angeles-based book publisher and its eponymous series of books about video games. Each book focuses solely on one video game. The company was founded by Gabe Durham in June 2013, and following a successful Kickstarter campaign in July, they released their first book, EarthBound by Ken Baumann in January 2014.

The idea for the series came when Durham was reading Jeff Ryan's Super Mario: How Nintendo Conquered America, as Durham wished that the book would slow down and provide more depth to the games it covered. After finding there was no video game-equivalent of 33 1/3—a series of books about individual record albums—Durham pitched the idea of the series to his friend, Ken Baumann, who agreed to write the first book and serve as the series' designer.

After securing agreements with authors for the first five books, Durham turned to Kickstarter, seeking $5,000 in funding, a target that was met within eight hours. At the close of the campaign in July 2013, Boss Fight Books had raised $45,429, allowing the project to proceed. As part of the crowdfunding campaign, backers got to vote on the subject of a sixth book, and Chrono Trigger, which had been considered but not included in the first five, was chosen. Boss Fight Books returned to Kickstarter to fund a second season consisting of a further six books; it too was successful, raising $53,186 in November 2014. Like the first campaign, backers got to vote on the subject of one of the books; they chose Shadow of the Colossus.

== List of books ==
=== Season 1 ===
| No. | Title | Author | Release date | ISBN |
|---|---|---|---|---|
| 1 | EarthBound | Ken Baumann | January 15, 2014 | 978-1-940535-00-5 |
Final Fantasy VI and Chrono Trigger were considered as candidate subjects initially, but Baumann believed that the scope of those games was narrower than that of EarthBound, a game he describes as "a weird, satirical, emotional, spiritual game", and "unlike any story I've experienced since". Baumann recalls playing EarthBound with his older brother as "one of the most formative experiences of my childhood", and he credits researching the book with a rekindling of his relationship with his brother. The book meshes Baumann's analysis of the game with autobiography, chronicling his playing of the game as a child, his upbringing, and his acting career. The book's structure has been likened to Grant Morrison's Supergods and Matthew Berry's Fantasy Life. Cameron Kunzelman, writing for Paste, gave the book a mixed review. He found Baumann's portrayal of the game and its characters evocative, managing to "render the strangeness of [the] game into graspable language", but criticised the self-indulgence of certain autobiographical sections. On the other hand, in a review at The Collagist, Ian Denning found the autobiographical sections an "emotional high point", passages on Baumann's relationship with his brother were described as "interesting, sometimes tender and funny". It was Baumann's analysis of the game that drew complaint from Denning, who criticised his scattershot approach, and questioned the value of its tangential references. Still, Denning deemed the book an accomplishment, "a book that argues that video games—a medium once considered cultural garbage—can be important catalysts in an artist's aesthetic development". Reflecting on the polarised reception of the autobiographical sections, Baumann said "I kind of love both reactions, and still do. I just like the strength of the reaction. I'm happy that I used personal stuff if it incites that much love or hate."
| 2 | Chrono Trigger | Michael P. Williams | April 1, 2014 | 978-1-940535-01-2 |
The author, Michael P. Williams, was selected after an open call for pitches for this fan selected book. Williams drew upon his experience living in Japan and his familiarity with its culture to explore Chrono Trigger's themes, examining the depiction of race, gender and sexuality in Japanese role-playing games. The book features original interviews with Ted Woolsey and Tom Slattery, translators on the SNES and DS versions of the game respectively. The structure of the book reflects the narrative of the game; the book skipping between themes as the game's plot skips backwards and forwards in time. Kunzelman, in his review for Paste, while noting the personal nature of the book, found it without the self-indulgence of Baumann's EarthBound. He found the initial chapters weak, declaring a chapter on the game's recruitable characters as "almost unbearable", but described later chapters as proposing "tightly-tuned arguments". Kunzelman sees the strength of the book stemming from Williams' insight into how Japanese culture and society may have shaped the game. Zach Welhouse, writing at RPGamer, too found the book more focused than EarthBound. He highlighted a chapter of new information on the game's English language localisation process, something also highlighted by Andy Hoover at Nintendojo, who deemed it as "a must read" for Chrono Trigger fans; the interview with Woolsey offering particular insight for those critical of the SNES localisation. Philip J. Reed, in his review at Nintendo Life commended the book's personal approach for having "come as close to capturing games as experiences as might actually be possible." Reed suggests that the book offers a new way to revisit the game, "[allowing] you to travel back in time and see it again, for the first time, through a fresh set of eyes." He concludes that the Boss Fight Books series could provide "an alternative future where video games no longer rot young minds and incite violence, but spur philosophical discussions and self-improvement."
| 3 | ZZT | Anna Anthropy | June 2, 2014 | 978-1-940535-02-9 |
ZZT is both a video game and a game creation system; Anthropy examines both aspects in her book. Anthropy delves into the now-defunct communities around the game, interviewing designers of ZZT user-created games, and highlighting a culture that has otherwise gone unrecorded. Kunzelman gave the book high praise in his review for Paste. He found none of the literary digressions for which he criticised earlier books in the series, though he had trouble understanding some of its more technical passages. Kunzelman found the book giving "an impassioned argument for why ZZT was, and continues to be, incredibly valuable for game players", and concluded that "Anthropy has set the gold standard for book-length studies of games with ZZT".
| 4 | Galaga | Michael Kimball | July 1, 2014 | 978-1-940535-03-6 |
Galaga consists of 255 mini chapters, mirroring the 255 stages found in the game. Kimball looks at the game, its place in contemporary culture, and how he related to it growing up in an abusive environment. In his review for the Baltimore City Paper, Brandon Soderberg lauded the treatment Kimball gave the game, rejecting the "BuzzFeeding of the immediate past", and instead providing depth and poignancy. The book caused Soderberg to reflect on his own life, and how video games act as windows into trauma, as he recounts the experience of playing Contra following a friend's suicide. Kunzelman, writing at Paste, found Galaga by far the weakest of the first four Boss Fight books. Kunzelman found the "short, staccato chapters" an exercise in frustration and quickly tired of their cyclic nature. He criticised the book's indulgence, believing some sections to be overwrought, and others to be overloaded with trivia. In between these flawed passages, Kunzelman found Kimball displaying expert craft in telling a moving personal story about "coping with the world through videogames" that "many, many people can relate to". For Kunzelman, that Kimball could be capable of such quality only made the other sections even more disappointing.
| 5 | Jagged Alliance 2 | Darius Kazemi | August 25, 2014 | 978-1-940535-04-3 |
Kazemi looks at the development history of Jagged Alliance 2 through interviews with the development team. At the 2014 Critical Proximity conference, Kazemi spoke about the insight he gleaned from looking at the game's source code as part of his research. Kazemi cites Aramis, or the Love of Technology as one of his inspirations behind the book in an article for The Atlantic exploring his motivations. He chose Jagged Alliance 2 not only because it is his favourite game, but because he believed that the game's obscurity would allow for more candour from its developers. He also believed that the shift from 2D to 3D graphics in the wider video games industry taking place during the game's development would surface as tensions in the story told. Austin Walker, writing for Paste, felt that the book worked well as a history book, placing Jagged Alliance 2 in the context of the video game industry as it transitioned through small independent developers towards larger teams tied to publishers. He praised the way Kazemi aligned all of the factors that formed the game and made it successful, without trying to force a dramatic narrative out of the people involved, but criticized that Kazemi "struggles with selling it to us as a fun game to play".
| 6 | Super Mario Bros. 2 | Jon Irwin | October 6, 2014 | 978-1-940535-05-0 |
Irwin, a staff writer for Kill Screen, examines the game in four sections based on the game's four player characters. As part of his research, Irwin spoke to Gail Tilden, the founding editor of Nintendo Power, and Andrew Gardikis, the world record holder for the game's tool-assisted speedrun. In his review at Nintendo Life, Tim Latshaw commends Irwin's ability to weave seemingly "ridiculous tangents" like One Thousand and One Nights into an exploration of the game and Nintendo's philosophy. He describes the book as "required reading for game historians", and for those curious about the game, "Irwin's relatable writing and healthy seasoning of humour make it an engrossing and enjoyable read." In Kunzelman's review at Paste, he too noted how Irwin managed to craft a book in which its tangents "impossibly, flow together", he compared this quality favourably to Galaga and Chrono Trigger, earlier books in the series. Kunzelman saw weakness in Irwin's moments of literary excess, such as an interlude on the death of the author's grandmother, which he found strange and clichéd. Still, he concluded that the book was "an excellent example of the Boss Fight Books model of game criticism", and was "very excited to see what happens during season 2".

=== Season 2 ===
| No. | Title | Author | Release date | ISBN |
|---|---|---|---|---|
| 7 | Bible Adventures | Gabe Durham | March 30, 2015 | 978-1-940535-07-4 |
Durham, the Boss Fight Books founder and series editor chose to write about Bible Adventures. Durham had played this unlicensed video game as a child, and with his father being a minister, he felt he understood Christian culture well enough to explain how games like this came to exist. Durham spoke with Roger Deforest and Dan Burke, two of the game's developers in the process of writing the book.
| 8 | Baldur's Gate II | Matt Bell | June 22, 2015 | 978-1-940535-08-1 |
Baldur's Gate II is part memoir and part reading of the game. Bell tells the story of his development as a writer; of his writing of the Dungeons & Dragons novel, The Last Garrison, and his study under Gordon Lish. Bell recalls his love of fantasy, role-playing, and video games, but feels shame in it, finding it difficult to reconcile with his adult aspirations towards literary fiction, even while acknowledging that genre influences have enlivened his own work. In the Baldur's Gate series of games, the story asks players to reconcile their character's good nature with their murderous heritage. Molly McArdle, writing for Brooklyn Magazine considered this "a perfect backdrop" for Bell's own conflict between his past and present selves. Kunzelman gave the book an ambivalent review in Paste, he did not see in the book a coherent reflection of the game, and that "anyone who has played the game can intuit every point Bell makes about the game". Yet he still found the book a pleasure to read, a credit to Bell's skill as a writer. At The Rumpus, reviewer Samuel Sattin describes the core theme of the book as "perceptions of success in the literary community", and asks "can genre conventions truly mesh with a literary author’s ambition to be taken seriously?" Sattin sees the book as "an uneasy, courageous, and ultimately vulnerable attempt to bridge a divide most of us are unwilling to admit exists", which succeeds through revealing this conflict.
| 9 | Metal Gear Solid | Ashly & Anthony Burch | August 17, 2015 | 978-1-940535-09-8 |
This collaboration between the Burch siblings was pitched as a celebration and takedown of a game that they loved. Told in a back and forth conversational manner between two authors who do not necessarily agree, the book covers topics such as the game's mechanics, storytelling and its treatment of female characters. Joel Couture describes the book as "an honest, heartfelt look at the game and franchise" in his review at indiegames.com. The book promoted Couture to think about the game in new ways, and to see Snake, the player character, in a light he had barely considered when playing the game as a teenager. Couture found the conversational tone between the authors comforting and approachable, their differing viewpoints well suited to a game that "[bounces] between outlandish and serious". At Paste, Kunzelman was in agreement, finding that the alternating voices of the authors provided "a nice point and counterpoint that allows the text to disagree with itself". And though the book's humour did not always work with Kunzelman, he ultimately saw the book as a work that "opens up a canonical videogame further than it ever has been before".
| 10 | Shadow of the Colossus | Nick Suttner | December 15, 2015 | 978-1-940535-10-4 |
Nick Suttner is a former writer at 1UP.com, and currently works in developer relations at Sony. His pitch for the Kickstarter backer selected title was accepted after an open call for submissions. Suttner describes his work as "more of a love letter and travelogue and less of a critique" of his favourite game of all time.
| 11 | Spelunky | Derek Yu | March 29, 2016 | 978-1-940535-11-1 |
Spelunky is the first book in the series to be written by the game's creator. Durham credits Spelunky as the title that connected with most people during the second season's Kickstarter campaign. Yu found writing the book a challenge, having never before written anything such length. Due to the autobiographical nature of the work, Nate Ewert-Krocker, in his review at ZAM describes it as having a different flavour than other books in the series. While giving the "clearest understanding of a game’s construction and design" than any other book in the series, the lack of distance between author and subject made the telling of the story straightforward. Writing at Paste, Kunzelman, who has spent over a hundred hours playing Spelunky, found the book accessible for casual and diehard fans alike, full of information that could not be found anywhere else.
| 12 | World of Warcraft | Daniel Lisi | June 20, 2016 | 978-1-940535-12-8 |
Daniel Lisi, founder and CEO of video game developer Game Over, discusses how immersive and consuming the game is, in the context of his experiences playing the game obsessively in high school and modern online culture.

=== Season 3 ===
| No. | Title | Author | Release date | ISBN |
|---|---|---|---|---|
| 13 | Super Mario Bros. 3 | Alyse Knorr | July 18, 2016 | 978-1-940535-13-5 |
| 14 | Mega Man 3 | Salvatore Pane | September 26, 2016 | 978-1-940535-14-2 |
| 15 | Soft & Cuddly | Jarett Kobek | January 24, 2017 | 978-1-940535-15-9 |
| 16 | Kingdom Hearts II | Alexa Ray Corriea | June 27, 2017 | 978-1-940535-16-6 |
| 17 | Katamari Damacy | L. E. Hall | October 16, 2018 | 978-1-940535-17-3 |

=== Season 4 ===
| No. | Title | Author | Release date | ISBN |
|---|---|---|---|---|
| 18 | Final Fantasy V | Chris Kohler | October 24, 2017 | 978-1-940535-18-0 |
| 19 | Shovel Knight | David L. Craddock | October 16, 2018 | 978-1-940535-19-7 |
| 20 | Star Wars: Knights of the Old Republic | Alex Kane | April 9, 2019 | 978-1-940535-21-0 |
Kane's book features interviews with several BioWare developers who worked on Star Wars: Knights of the Old Republic. The A.V. Club's Cameron Kunzelman called the book "a great gift for any Star Wars nerd".
| 21 | NBA Jam | Reyan Ali | October 22, 2019 | 978-1-940535-20-3 |
| 22 | Breakout: Pilgrim in the Microworld | David Sudnow | February 26, 2020 | 978-1-940535-23-4 |
| 23 | Postal | Brock Wilbur & Nathan Rabin | April 7, 2020 | 978-1-940535-22-7 |

=== Season 5 ===
| No. | Title | Author | Release date | ISBN |
|---|---|---|---|---|
| 24 | Red Dead Redemption | Matt Margini | July 7, 2020 | 978-1-940535-24-1 |
| 25 | Resident Evil | Philip J. Reed | August 25, 2020 | 978-1-940535-25-8 |
| 26 | The Legend of Zelda: Majora's Mask | Gabe Durham | October 26, 2020 | 978-1-940535-26-5 |
| 27 | Silent Hill 2 | Mike Drucker | January 26, 2021 | 978-1-940535-27-2 |
Bloody Disgusting's Aaron Boehm called Drucker's book "an easy recommendation for any fan of Silent Hill 2, or anyone who is looking to read more about how games are capable of telling smaller, more personal tales by rejecting the traditional structures of the genre".
| 28 | Final Fantasy VI | Sebastian Deken | July 13, 2021 | 978-1-940535-28-9 |

=== Special ===
| No. | Title | Author | Release date | ISBN |
|---|---|---|---|---|
| 29 | GoldenEye 007 | Alyse Knorr | December 1, 2022 | 978-1-940535-29-6 |
Knorr wrote a documentary-style book focusing on the development and legacy of GoldenEye 007, featuring original interviews with the development team, as well as other developers, scholars, and fans. The book was funded on Kickstarter, where supporters could purchase an extended hardcover edition.

=== Season 6 ===
During funding for the sixth season, a documentary-style book, Super Mario RPG was selected by a fan vote. Jet Set Radio was the runner-up, while Harvest Moon and Pikmin tied for third.

| No. | Title | Author | Release date | ISBN |
|---|---|---|---|---|
| 30 | PaRappa the Rapper | Mike Sholars | June 6, 2023 | 978-1-940535-31-9 |
| 31 | Minesweeper | Kyle Orland | July 12, 2023 | 978-1-940535-32-6 |
| 32 | Day of the Tentacle | Bob Mackey | October 9, 2023 | 978-1-940535-33-3 |
| 33 | Animal Crossing | Kelsey Lewin | May 15, 2024 | 978-1-940535-34-0 |
Polygon published an excerpt from the book in January 2025.

=== Season 7 ===
The seventh season was announced on August 20, 2024, alongside the launch of its Kickstarter campaign.

| No. | Title | Author | Release date | ISBN |
|---|---|---|---|---|
| 34 | EverQuest | Matthew S. Smith | December 3, 2024 | 978-1-94053-535-7 |
Smith's book analyzes the history of EverQuest with new developer interviews, including with Ryan Barker, Jeff Butler, Michelle Butler, and Brian Canary.
| 35 | Untitled Goose Game | James O'Connor | January 28, 2025 | 978-1-94053-536-4 |
O'Connor's book chronicles the development history of Untitled Goose Game, including its pre-release popularity, featuring interviews with developers and journalists. O'Connor had wanted to write about Australian game development for some time before working on the book.
| 36 | Outer Wilds | Tommy Wallach | May 20, 2025 | 978-1-94053-537-1 |
| 37 | Dance Dance Revolution | Jessica Doyle and Jordan Ferguson | June 24, 2025 | 978-1-94053-538-8 |

=== Season 8 ===
The eighth season was announced on July 8, 2024, alongside the launch of its Kickstarter campaign.

| No. | Title | Author | Release date | ISBN |
|---|---|---|---|---|
| 38 | Legend of the River King | Alexander B. Joy | April 14, 2026 | 978-1-940535-39-5 |
RPGFan's Ben Love lauded Joy's writing, noting it is "so rich with cultural context, literary analysis, and philosophical insight" and praising "how effortlessly it weaves between cogent analysis and detailed summary".
| 39 | Life Is Strange | Kaitlin Tremblay | March 2026 | 978-1-940535-40-1 |
| 40 | Dragon Age II | Charlotte Reber | March 2026 | 978-1-940535-41-8 |
Reber's book tells the story of Dragon Age II's development, based on interviews with developers such as David Gaider, Jennifer Hepler, Lukas Kristjanson, and Karin Weekes.
| 41 | Age of Empires: How Ensemble Studios Made History | Richard Moss | June 2026 | 978-1-940535-42-5 |
Age of Empires received its own Kickstarter campaign and hardcover edition like GoldenEye 007. The book was given a subtitle and a new design, replacing the previous stock images with custom artwork.

=== Season 9 ===
| No. | Title | Author | Release date | ISBN |
|---|---|---|---|---|
| 42 | Super Mario Galaxy: The Artistry and Impact of Nintendo's One Giant Leap | Jordan Minor | November 30, 2026 | 978-1-940535-44-9 |
Minor's book explores Super Mario Galaxy's personal impact, including his inspiration to become a games journalist and a supporter in game preservation.
| 43 | But Can It Run Doom? | David L. Craddock | January 2027 | —N/a |
Craddock's book explores the phenomenon in which people modify or homebrew devices to run id Software's Doom. The book features a foreword from id Software co-founder John Romero. Craddock revealed he was working on the book in December 2023, in a livestream celebrating Doom's 30-year anniversary.

=== Anthologies ===
| No. | Title | Editor | Release date | ISBN |
|---|---|---|---|---|
| 1 | Continue? | Gabe Durham | January 20, 2015 | 978-1-940535-06-7 |
The first anthology book features works from previous writers Ken Baumann, Jon Irwin, Darius Kazemi, and Michael P. Williams, as well new writers Matt Bell, Rachel B. Glaser, Rebekah Frumkin, Brian Oliu, Salvatore Pane, Tevis Thompson, and Mike Lars White.
| 2 | Nightmare Mode | Gabe Durham | October 26, 2021 | 978-1-940535-53-1 |
The second anthology book features works from Alexa Ray Corriea, David L. Craddock, Gabe Durham, Alex Kane, Jon Irwin, Alyse Knorr, Chris Kohler, Salvatore Pane, Philip J. Reed, and Michael P. Williams.
