= Night Beast =

2018 book by Ruth Joffre

- Author: Ruth Joffre
- Genre: Science fiction and magical realism
- Publisher: Grove Atlantic, Black Cat imprint
- Publication date: 2018
- Pages: 208
- ISBN: 978-0-8021-2808-9
- Website: groveatlantic.com/book/night-beast/

Night Beast and Other Stories is a collection of science fiction and magical realist short stories written by Ruth Joffre and published in 2018.

== Overview ==
Night Beast consists of eleven short stories. The collection begins with "Nitrate Nocturnes", which features protagonist Fiona and her "supposed soul mate" Marianne. Other stories include "Safekeeping", about a scientist residing in a bunker, "Go West, and Grow Up," about a mother and daughter living in a car, "The Weekend", about two avant-garde actors, "Two Lies", about a mother and her children, and "The Twilight Hotel", about coping after a miscarriage. The final story in the book is "Night Beast", featuring Gemma and Sydney and their relationship.

== Background ==
Joffre completed an MFA at the Iowa Writers' Workshop, then moved to Seattle in 2014 and began teaching at Hugo House. In an interview with Poets & Writers magazine, Joffre described her search for agents as focused on "those who represented story collections and/or queer writers I admired", and said she consulted with author Rebekah Frumkin, who suggested Ross Harris; Joffre ultimately signed with Harris, who then sold her book to Grove Atlantic. In an interview with Lightspeed magazine, Joffre discussed semi-autobiographical elements in the character Fiona, including her past work at Cornell Cinema, as well as the development and themes in the story. Before the book was published, "Night Beast" was selected by author Kelly Link as the winner of a Fall Fiction Contest held by The Masters Review.

== Themes ==
Elisabeth Woronzoff writes in PopMatters, "Night Beast centralizes queer and women characters with fluid sexualities." In the Colorado Review, Jennifer Popa notes Joffre "refuses to pin down any character's sexuality" and does not use labels such as "bisexual," "pansexual," or "homosexual". Kelly Lynn Thomas of Ploughshares identifies "fluid" as a one-word description of the book, and writes, "Joffre achieves this fluidity by refusing labels, marrying concrete sensory details to emotions, and using elements of fabulism and magical realism." Thomas also writes, "Loneliness winds its way through the collection as Joffre explores what it means to be loved, to offer love, and to forcibly take love."

In Zyzzyva, Angela Yin writes that a "subtle theme of consumption and performance is weaved into many of the stories." Popa writes, "Sexual abuse is a palpable threat in a handful of these stories, but it is rarely explicit", while Thomas describes the abuse as "always alluded to more than shown". Popa also writes, "Central to this collection are the beasts that inhabit these stories. Joffre's fiction repeatedly asks what kinds of beasts do women negotiate? What are their shapes and how do we know them when we see them?"

== Critical reception ==
Publishers Weekly describes the book as "an auspicious debut" and writes, "Joffre’s characters [...] all experience love and loss in a collection that amounts to a cri de coeur for sympathy and understanding." In a review for Zyzzyva, Angela Yin writes, "Despite the collection’s exploration of various genres—from magical realism to science-fiction—and varied points-of-view (including that of an immigrant Chinese boy and a homeless girl), the book instills a single feeling of cold, detached melancholy as we repeatedly glimpse the many shapes and terrible costs of these characters' "painful and hidden" love." In a review for Ploughshares, Kelly Lynn Thomas says Joffre "has a knack for describing ordinary sensory details in a way that makes them vaguely threatening and sinister." Alina Grabowski writes for The Masters Review, "It's a mysterious and dark book, unafraid of confronting just how bleak life can be."

In a review for Booklist, Lynnanne Pearson writes, "Readers looking for happy endings should look elsewhere, as the author does a masterful job of showcasing the danger, both literal and figurative, that women face by loving another person." Kirkus Reviews writes, "The circumstances here are bleak: Men in the book are either oblivious or outright violent, but the women are rarely able to sustain more than fleeting comfort with each other. This hopelessness is underscored by a kind of narrative blurriness: Details in the stories get attention and then are abandoned, while seemingly crucial moments of motive or interiority are missing." Jennifer Popa writes for the Colorado Review, "Joffre precisely renders the emotional landscape of each character—psychically we are very near these women and their interiority." In a review for PopMatters, Elisabeth Woronzoff writes, "Joffre shines in her ability to spotlight women and queer characters, however, Night Beast is a fitful debut."
