= Dayworld =

1985 novel by Philip José Farmer

- First edition
- Author: Philip José Farmer
- Cover artist: Don Ivan Punchatz
- Language: English
- Series: Dayworld
- Genre: Science fiction
- Published: 1985 by Putnam Publishing Group
- Publication place: United States
- Media type: Print (Hardback & Paperback); Ebook (Adobe Acrobat & MS Reader)
- Pages: 320
- ISBN: 0-399-12967-7
- OCLC: 11133683
- Dewey Decimal: 813/.54 19
- LC Class: PS3556.A72 D34 1985
- Followed by: Dayworld Rebel

Dayworld is a science fiction novel by American writer Philip José Farmer. Published in 1985, it is the first in the Dayworld tetralogy of novels inspired by Farmer's own 1971 short story "The Sliced-Crosswise Only-On-Tuesday World". There are two sequels - Dayworld Rebel (1987) and Dayworld Breakup (1990) - and one prequel, Dayworld: A Hole in Wednesday, co-authored by Danny Adams (2016).

== Plot summary ==
The story is set in a dystopian future in which an overpopulated world solves the problem by allocating people only one day per week. For the rest of the six days they are "stoned", a kind of suspended animation. The novels focus on a man, Jeff Caird, who is a daybreaker, someone who lives more than one day a week. He is not like most daybreakers; he belongs to a government defying group called the "Immers". The Immers are a very large and powerful group that works to create a better government. Not all Immers are daybreakers, so to get messages and information from one day to the next, they have daybreakers, like Jeff, to work in every day. The daybreakers of the Immers assume seven different personalities and seven different jobs. They slip from culture to culture, in seven different worlds.

As Jeff goes day to day, he runs into problems while working as an Immer and as a daybreaker, and must cover his tracks, all while trying to keep up with his seven different lives, families, friends, and jobs. Eventually the stress makes Jeff unstable, and the Immers must dispose of him to keep the rest of the Immers safe. Jeff, wanting to live, tries to escape the Immers, but there are undercover Immers in every job, area, and government level. Jeff is caught and put in a sort of insane asylum, classified with “multiple personality disorder”, for the legal time before he can be considered “incurable” and killed. But Jeff has an escape plan...

== Reception ==
Dave Langford reviewed Dayworld for White Dwarf #84, and stated that "another fast-moving example of a far-out social setup within which the author merely plays cops and robbers."

=== Awards and recognition ===
The novel was nominated for the Best SF Novel Locus Award poll in 1986, classifying 23rd.

== See also ==
- Marooned in Realtime
- "The Sliced-Crosswise Only-On-Tuesday World"
- Philip José Farmer bibliography
