= Swept Away (Steve Hunter album) =

- cover by Don Punchatz

Studio album by Steve Hunter
- Released: 1977
- Recorded: 1976–1977
- Genre: Rock
- Label: Atco
- Producer: Bob Ezrin, Brian Christian

Steve Hunter chronology
Swept Away (1977)	The Deacon (1989)

Professional ratings
Review scores
Source	Rating
AllMusic	4/5 stars

Swept Away is the debut solo album by noted session guitarist Steve Hunter. It was released on the Atco Records label in 1977, and was produced by Bob Ezrin and Brian Christian after Jerry L. Greenberg, the President of Atlantic Records, approached Hunter about doing a solo album.

== Track listing ==
All tracks composed by Steve Hunter; except where indicated

=== Side one ===
1. "Eight Miles High" (Gene Clark, James McGuinn, David Crosby)
2. "Eldorado Street"
3. "Goin' Down" (Traditional/Don Nix; arranged by Steve Hunter)
4. "Rubber Man"
5. "Of All the Times to Leave"

=== Side two ===
1. "Jasper St. Viaduct Gitar Rag"
2. "Sail On Sailor" (Ray Kennedy, Tandyn Almer, Jack Rieley, Van Dyke Parks, Brian Wilson)
3. "Swept Away"
4. "Sea Sonata"
5. "Deep Blue"

== Personnel ==
- Steve Hunter - all guitars, vocals
- Prakash John - bass
- Jim Gordon - drums
- Bob Ezrin - keyboards, percussion, vocals, producer
- With:
  - Jim Maelen - percussion
  - Jozef Chirowski - Fender Rhodes on "Eldorado Street"
  - Dr. C. Ezrin M.D. F.R.C.P. (C) F.A.C.P. professor of medicine, University of Toronto - upright bass
  - Carol Pope, Joanne Brooks, Tony D'Amico - vocals

Technical

- Don Punchatz - cover illustration
- Don Exeley - back cover photo
- Lynn Breslin, Bob Defrin - art direction
