= The Sliced-Crosswise Only-On-Tuesday World =

- Short story by Philip José Farmer
- Country: United States
- Language: English
- Genre(s): Science fiction

Publication
- Published in: New Dimensions 1: Fourteen Original Science Fiction Stories
- Publisher: Doubleday
- Media type: Print (Hardback)
- Publication date: 1971

"The Sliced-Crosswise Only-On-Tuesday World" is a science fiction short story by American writer Philip José Farmer, first published in 1971 in New Dimensions 1: Fourteen Original Science Fiction Stories. The story later formed the basis for Farmer's Dayworld trilogy of novels.

== Synopsis ==
Due to extreme overpopulation of Earth, citizens in the year 2055 are constrained to "stoners" – cylinders that suspend all atomic and subatomic activity in the body – for every day of the week, except for the one to which they are allocated. Tom Pym only experiences Tuesdays, but yearns to contact a beautiful woman, Jennie Marlowe, who awakens only on Wednesdays. He leaves Jennie an audio message, but she responds with the suggestion that he forget about her. To be with Jennie, Tom attempts to have his allocated day changed to Wednesday, but significant government bureaucracy is involved. An influential psychiatrist, Doctor Traurig, after viewing Jennie's cylinder, agrees that Tom's life would be better on Wednesday, and pushes through his application. However, Tom awakens on Wednesday to find that Jennie's cylinder is missing; she has, in exchange, been relocated to Tuesday.

== Reception ==
Both Terry Carr and Lester del Rey selected "The Sliced-Crosswise Only-On-Tuesday World" for inclusion on their respective "years-best" short story volumes, making it the only story from the New Dimensions 1 volume to be chosen twice. Mike Ashley writes that the story was not original, but nevertheless topical on first publication. Greenberg et al., in the 1975 anthology Social Problems Through Science Fiction, describe Farmer's story as "sociologically meaningful as well as fascinating reading [...] Farmer does not have a "solution" to the population problem within the usual parameters of proposed answers. He does, however, describe just how different a world inundated by humanity might be." Michael Smith described the story as depicting "perhaps the most extreme example of constrained freedom in an overcrowded future."

== See also ==
- "The Gift of the Magi"
- Dayworld
- Marooned in Realtime
- What Happened to Monday
