= Dayworld (novel series) =

Novel trilogy by Philip José Farmer

- Dayworld (1985); Dayworld Rebel (1987); Dayworld Breakup (1990); Dayworld: A Hole in Wednesday (2016)
- Author: Philip José Farmer
- Country: United States
- Language: English
- Genre: Science fiction
- Published: 1985-2016
- Media type: Print

Dayworld is a trilogy of science fiction novels by Philip José Farmer, inspired by his own short story "The Sliced-Crosswise Only-On-Tuesday World". They are set in a dystopian future in which people are allowed to live only one day of the week. For the rest of the six days, they are "stoned", kept in a kind of suspended animation. The novels focus on a man, Jeff Caird, who is a daybreaker: someone who lives more than one day a week. As the series progresses, the main character seems to be suffering from dissociative identity disorder. The novels comprising the trilogy are:

- Dayworld (1985)
- Dayworld Rebel (1987)
- Dayworld Breakup (1990)

In 2016, a prequel to the trilogy, Dayworld: A Hole in Wednesday, by Philip José Farmer and Danny Adams, was published (seven years after Farmer's death in 2009). Adams also collaborated with Farmer on the short novel The City Beyond Play.

== Plot background ==
Jeff Caird is a citizen of Tuesday-World N.E. (New Era) 1330. The book starts on D5-W1 (Day-Five, Week-One) in the Second Month of N.E. 1330. (Each day of the week is the same day number, i.e. Sun-Sat will still be D5-W1). The book takes place over a full week, from Tuesday-World D5-W1 to Tuesday-World D6-W1. Jeff Caird is an 'organic' (police officer) by profession. Each day of the week organics have a different outfit. Also, each day of the week has a different fashion trend, TV shows, news, and so on, most people only knowing about each in his or her own day. However, Jeff Caird is a daybreaker, and not only that, he's an immer. The immers are a group of individuals living and acting beneath the radar of the government. The goal of the immers is to slowly and subtly change the government for the better. There are immers in just about every aspect of society in each day of the week. Jeff Caird is special in that he is a daybreaker as sanctioned by the immers, used to pass messages from day to day. As a daybreaker, Caird has mentally created a different identity for himself for each day of the week, different jobs, different friends, and different wives all included.

== Stoners ==
A stoner is the device that triggers the suspended animation in which each and every citizen of the respective day must, by law, be in by 11:30pm. At 11:35 (in accordance with a five-minute grace period), the stoners turn on and the occupant is essentially frozen in time, resembling a stone statue. At 12:15am the following morning, citizens of the current day are de-stoned. A stoner resembles a cylindrical upright capsule with a circular window in the door.
