= Dayworld Rebel =

1987 novel by Philip José Farmer

- First edition
- Author: Philip José Farmer
- Cover artist: Don Ivan Punchatz
- Language: English
- Series: Dayworld
- Genre: Science fiction
- Publisher: Putnam Publishing Group
- Publication date: 1987
- Publication place: United States
- Media type: Print (Hardback & Paperback)
- Pages: 317 (paperback edition)
- ISBN: 0-399-13230-9 (paperback edition)
- OCLC: 14588824
- Dewey Decimal: 813/.54 19
- LC Class: PS3556.A72 D4 1987
- Preceded by: Dayworld
- Followed by: Dayworld Breakup

Dayworld Rebel is a 1987 science fiction novel by American writer Philip José Farmer, the second book in the Dayworld Trilogy.

== Plot summary ==
In this sequel, Jeff Caird has created a new personality for himself submerging his previous personalities, including his primary personality. He now goes by the name William St.-George Duncan. He has no memory of his previous personalities. He successfully engineers a daring escape from his captors and manages to connect with a rebel organization of Daybreakers. Throughout the novel, he discovers the true nature of the ruling government and the rebel organization.

== See also ==
- Philip José Farmer bibliography
