= Don Ivan Punchatz =

American science fiction and fantasy artist (1936–2009)

Don Ivan Punchatz (September 8, 1936 – October 22, 2009) was a science fiction and fantasy artist who drew illustrations for numerous books and publications, including magazines such as Heavy Metal, National Geographic, Playboy, and Time. He illustrated album covers, providing the cover art for session guitarist Steve Hunter's debut solo album, Swept Away and Luiz Bonfa's 1972 album Introspection. Characterized as a "skilled hyperrealist with a penchant for the fantastic and absurd" and "elegantly weird", he produced cover art for books by Harlan Ellison, Isaac Asimov and others.

Punchatz was born in Arlington, Texas. In 1970, he started the SketchPad Studio there, where he trained dozens of apprentices (known as "the elves") and came to be known as the "Godfather of Dallas Illustration." During 1993, id Software hired him to create the Doom video game package art and logo. The result was named the second best video game box art of all time by GameSpy. His son, Gregor Punchatz, has worked on special effects for several films, and also created monster sculptures for Doom.

Punchatz suffered a cardiac arrest on October 11, 2009 and died in an Arlington hospital on October 22, 2009.

== Partial cover art bibliography ==
- A Barnstormer in Oz
- Dayworld
- Dayworld Rebel
- Foundation and Empire
- Gods of Riverworld
- Second Foundation
- Worlds of the Federation

== Video game cover art ==
- Doom (1993)
