= It runs Doom =

Video game homebrew scene

It runs Doom or its alternative phrase, "Can it run Doom?", is a popular phrase and internet meme where people modify or homebrew various devices to run the 1993 first-person shooter, Doom. The phrase is generally used whenever tech users find a device that is not considered to be a video game console nor personal computer, examples being a treadmill, calculator, or a pregnancy test. The point of the meme is to port the game to various absurd devices, which is enabled by the official 1997 release of the source code for Doom's unofficial Linux port.

== Background ==
An early example of porting Doom to unconventional platforms was a Super Nintendo Entertainment System (SNES) port developed by Sculptured Software. The SNES lacked a 32-bit processor, running on a 16-bit chip instead. In order for the SNES to run Doom, it required the Super FX expansion chip, a coprocessor that helped run 3D games like Star Fox and Yoshi's Island. According to the port's head programmer Randy Linden, neither the Super FX chip nor the development kit were available to Sculptured Software at the time when the port was being made, so Linden had to compromise. Linden used a "hacked-up" Star Fox cartridge to get access to the Super FX chip and wrote his own engine for the port, which he dubbed the Reality Engine.

In 1997, the source code for Doom was released under a non-commercial license before being officially released in 1999 under the GNU General Public License. The source code came from an unofficial Linux port, which was created by id Software programmer Dave Taylor. According to another id programmer, John Carmack, the code is only designed to run on Linux, but is portable enough to be modified to run on "just about any" other device. Following the source release, the Doom community would start to create modified versions of the engine called source ports, expanding the technical capabilities of the engine, and enabling new forms of modding. Some of these modified versions were also used to port the game to other devices. Two of the most popular source ports for this are Chocolate Doom and PrBoom, minimalist source ports that are derived from both the Linux and Windows ports.

== Notable examples ==
=== Graphing calculators ===
Graphing calculators are considered to be some of the most popular third-party porting platforms for Doom, due to its minimal memory and processing power requirements. The earliest example of Doom being ported to a calculator was in February 2011, when users from the Omnimaga forums released a beta build of the port alongside videos demonstrating the gameplay. The build used to play Doom on the calculator was an early build of the source port NDoom, a reworked version of the FPS.It was also ported to the NumWorks calculator by a French developer in 2026.

=== ATMs ===
In 2014, YouTube user Aussie50 was able to acquire an ATM. With this ATM, he and his friend were able to install and play Doom on it, as well as have the ATM's built-in buttons control the game. ATMs typically run a version of Windows, providing easy compatibility with Doom. The ATM in the video is shown running Windows XP, but features the MS-DOS command line, suggesting the use of an MS-DOS emulator like DOSBOX.

=== Graphing calculator powered by mouldy potatoes ===
In October 2020, YouTube user Equalo was able to run Doom on a graphing calculator that was powered by 100 pounds of boiled, aging potatoes, in a manner similar to a "potato battery". To achieve this, Equalo used russet potatoes, which produced the most energy out of all of the potatoes that he tested. Originally, Equalo was going to use a Raspberry Pi Zero, due to its low powered requirements, but eventually switched to a TI-84 calculator after the experiment failed with the Pi Zero.

=== John Deere tractors ===
In August 2022, Australian security researcher Sick Codes revealed at DEF CON that he was able to jailbreak his John Deere tractor's console to play a farm-themed version of Doom, created by DOOM modder Skelegant. The jailbreak was made in support of the right to repair movement, and in protest of John Deere's anti-repair efforts. To develop the jailbreak, Sick Codes had examined many different John Deere tractor control touchscreen consoles. By soldering controllers onto the tractor's circuitry, Sick Codes was able to falsify a reboot check, causing the tractor to act as though it was being serviced by a licensed dealer.

=== E. coli bacteria ===
In 2024, Lauren Ramlan, a Massachusetts Institute of Technology biotechnology researcher, was able to make a 32x48 1-bit display using cell wall of E. coli bacteria to display Doom. Ramlan connected the grid of cells to a controller that alters the fluorescence of the cells based on the game pixels, using the controlled addition of a repressor. According to Ramlan, it will take up to 600 years in order to play DOOM in full due the display taking 70 minutes to illuminate one frame and 8 hours to go back to its starting state.

=== Satellite in Earth orbit ===
In March 2024, Doom demo files (LMPs) of user input were played back on OPS-SAT-1, a cube satellite operated by the European Space Agency (ESA). (As cube satellites are small, there was no crew to play the game directly, hence the use of recordings of player input.) A port, doomgeneric, was used to modify the game subtly to include images taken by the OPS-SAT camera as background. Screenshots were taken of the demo playback in space with these new backgrounds, and sent back to Earth.

=== Human brain cells ===
In 2026, Australian biotechnology company Cortical Labs promoted the CL1, a code-deployable biological computer, by publishing a YouTube video demonstrating approximately 200,000 human brain cells controlling a copyright-free version of Doom, called Freedoom. To be able to adapt the game to the CL1, the researchers had to map a video feed of the game to “patterns of neural stimulation”. By doing so, the neurons generate a output, responding to the event the video feed is showing.

== Related examples ==
=== Pregnancy test ===
In September 2020, California-based programmer Alice Averlong posted videos on her Twitter account showing pre-recorded videos of Doom playing on a pregnancy test. She was inspired by Twitter posts complaining about expensive pregnancy tests containing a microcontroller (comparable in power to early home computers) whose sole job is to read a cheap test strip. Averlong explained in a later post that she had to replace the test's CPU and LCD with an external processor and screen in order for it to eventually run Doom interactively, using dithering to translate the graphics into a 128×32-pixel monochromatic OLED by Adafruit and a small Bluetooth keyboard for controls. No audio was outputted, which would have required additional hardware. Several stages of Averlong's process went viral, which she found "amusing", and media outlets considered it an example of the phenomenon, though Mashable's Stan Schroeder felt Averlong was "cheating a little" by using an external processor. Popular Mechanics's Caroline Delbert questioned if a different model of pregnancy test might be capable of running the game.

== See also ==
- List of Doom ports
- Hacking of consumer electronics
- "Can it run Crysis"
- Bad Apple!! – Music video recreations in the demoscene and retrocomputing communities
