= Dayworld Breakup =

1990 novel by Philip José Farmer

- First edition
- Author: Philip José Farmer
- Cover artist: Vincent Di Fate
- Language: English
- Series: Dayworld
- Genre: Science fiction
- Publisher: Tor
- Publication date: 1990
- Publication place: United States
- Media type: Print (hardback & paperback)
- Pages: 324 (paperback edition)
- ISBN: 0-312-85035-2 (paperback edition)
- OCLC: 24246420
- Preceded by: Dayworld Rebel

Dayworld Breakup is a 1990 science fiction novel by American writer Philip José Farmer, the last book in the Dayworld Trilogy.

== See also ==
- Philip José Farmer bibliography
