= Doom (1993 video game) =

First-person shooter game

- Cover art by Don Ivan Punchatz
- Developer: id Software
- Publisher: id Software
- Designers: John Romero; Tom Hall; Sandy Petersen
- Programmers: John Carmack; John Romero; Dave Taylor
- Artists: Adrian Carmack; Kevin Cloud
- Composer: Robert Prince (Note: The music for the PlayStation and Sega Saturn ports of the game was composed by Aubrey Hodges, while the 2024 release featured the 2016 "IDKFA" arrangement soundtrack by Andrew Hulshult.)
- Series: Doom
- Engine: Doom engine (Note: The 2019 release uses Unity, while the 2024 release uses the KEX Engine.)
- Platforms: MS-DOS: 32X; Atari Jaguar; PC-98; Super NES; PlayStation; Mac OS; 3DO; Windows; Sega Saturn; RISC OS; Game Boy Advance; Xbox; Xbox 360; iOS; PlayStation 3; Android; Nintendo Switch; PlayStation 4; Xbox One; PlayStation 5; Xbox Series X/S
- Release: December 10, 1993: MS-DOS; NA: December 10, 1993; EU: December 1993; 32X; NA: November 21, 1994; PAL: January 1995; Jaguar; NA: November 28, 1994; PC-98; JP: December 9, 1994; Super NES; NA: September 1995; EU: October 26, 1995; JP: March 1, 1996; PlayStation; NA: November 16, 1995; EU: December 1995; Mac OS; NA: December 1995; 3DO; NA: April 26, 1996; Saturn; NA: March 26, 1997; EU: 1997; RISC OS; EU: 1998; Game Boy Advance; NA: October 24, 2001; EU: November 16, 2001; Xbox 360; WW: September 27, 2006; iOS; EU: October 30, 2009; NA: October 31, 2009; PlayStation 3; NA: November 20, 2012; Android, Switch, PlayStation 4, Xbox One; WW: July 26, 2019; PlayStation 5, Xbox Series X/S; WW: August 8, 2024
- Genre: First-person shooter
- Modes: Single-player, multiplayer

Doom is a 1993 first-person shooter game developed and published by id Software for MS-DOS. It is the first installment in the Doom franchise. The player assumes the role of a space marine, later unofficially referred to as Doomguy, fighting through hordes of undead humans and invading demons. The game begins on the moons of Mars and finishes in hell, with the player traversing each level to find its exit or defeat its final boss. It is an early example of 3D graphics in video games, and has enemies and objects as 2D images, a technique sometimes referred to as 2.5D graphics.

Doom was the third major independent release by id Software, after Commander Keen (1990–1991) and Wolfenstein 3D (1992). In May 1992, id started developing a darker game focused on fighting demons with technology, using a new 3D game engine from the lead programmer, John Carmack. The designer Tom Hall initially wrote a science fiction plot, but he and most of the story were removed from the project, with the final game featuring an action-heavy design by John Romero and Sandy Petersen. Id published Doom as a set of three episodes under the shareware model, marketing the full game by releasing the first episode free. A retail version with an additional episode was published in 1995 by GT Interactive as The Ultimate Doom.

Doom was a critical and commercial success, earning a reputation as one of the best and most influential video games of all time. It sold an estimated 3.5 million copies by 1999, and up to 20 million people are estimated to have played it within two years of launch. It has been termed the "father" of first-person shooters and is regarded as one of the most important games in the genre. Doom was included in the first ten "game canon" video games selected for preservation by the Library of Congress in 2007, and its soundtrack was selected for preservation in the National Recording Registry in 2026.

The game has been cited by video game historians as shifting the direction and public perception of the medium as a whole, as well as sparking the rise of online games and communities. It led to an array of imitators and clones, as well as a robust modding scene and the birth of speedrunning as a community. Its high level of graphic violence led to controversy from a range of groups. Doom has been ported to a variety of platforms both officially and unofficially and has been followed by several games in the series, including Doom II (1994), Doom 64 (1997), Doom 3 (2004), Doom (2016), Doom Eternal (2020), and Doom: The Dark Ages (2025), as well as the films Doom (2005) and Doom: Annihilation (2019).

== Gameplay ==
Screenshot of the player armed with a chainsaw confronting an undead soldier with a shotgun on a bridge over a chemical waste storage in "Knee-Deep in the Dead"

Doom is a first-person shooter presented with 3D graphics. While the environment is shown in a 3D perspective, movement is restricted to a two-dimensional (2D) plane, a technique sometimes referred to as 2.5D graphics. The enemies and objects are 2D sprites rendered at fixed angles, known as billboarding. In the single-player campaign mode, the player controls an unnamed space marine—later unofficially termed "Doomguy"—through military bases on the moons of Mars and in hell. To finish a level, the player must traverse through labyrinthine areas to reach a marked exit room. Levels are grouped into named episodes, with the final level of each focusing on a boss fight.

While traversing the levels, the player must fight a variety of enemies, including demons and possessed undead humans. Enemies often appear in large groups. The five difficulty levels adjust the number of enemies and amount of damage they do, with enemies moving and attacking faster than normal on the hardest difficulty setting. The monsters have simple behavior: they move toward their opponent if they see or hear them, and attack by biting, clawing, or using magic abilities such as fireballs.

The player must manage supplies of ammunition, health, and armor while traversing the levels. The player can find weapons and ammunition throughout the levels or can collect them from dead enemies, including a pistol, a shotgun, a chainsaw, a plasma rifle, and the BFG 9000. The player also encounters pits of toxic waste, ceilings that lower and crush objects, and locked doors requiring a collectable keycard or a remote switch. Power-ups include health or armor points, a mapping computer, partial invisibility, a radiation suit against toxic waste, invulnerability, or a super-strong melee berserker status. Cheat codes allow the player to unlock all weapons, walk through walls, or become invulnerable.

Two multiplayer modes are playable over a network: cooperative, in which two to four players team up to complete the main campaign, and deathmatch, in which two to four players compete to kill the other players' characters as many times as possible. Multiplayer was initially only playable over local networks, but a four-player online multiplayer mode was made available one year after launch through the DWANGO service.

== Plot ==
Doom is divided into three episodes, each containing eight main levels: "Knee-Deep in the Dead", "The Shores of Hell", and "Inferno". A fourth episode, "Thy Flesh Consumed", was added in an expanded version, The Ultimate Doom, released two years after Doom. The campaign contains very few plot elements, with a minimal story presented mostly through the instruction manual and text descriptions between episodes.

In the future, an unnamed marine is posted to a dead-end assignment on Mars after assaulting a superior officer who ordered his unit to fire on civilians. The Union Aerospace Corporation, which operates radioactive waste facilities there, allows the military to conduct secret teleportation experiments that turn deadly. A base on Phobos urgently requests military support, while Deimos disappears entirely, and the marine joins a combat force to secure Phobos. He secures the perimeter as ordered while the entire response team is wiped out. With no way off the moon, and armed with only a pistol, he enters the base intent on revenge.

In "Knee-Deep in the Dead", the marine fights demons and possessed humans in the military and waste facilities on Phobos. The episode ends with the marine defeating two powerful Barons of Hell guarding a teleporter to the Deimos base. After the battle, the marine passes through the teleporter and is ambushed by a horde of enemies. In "The Shores of Hell", the marine fights through corrupted research facilities on Deimos, culminating in the defeat of a gigantic cyberdemon. From an overlook, he discovers that the moon is floating above hell and rappels down to the surface. In "Inferno", the marine battles through hell itself and destroys a cybernetic spider-demon that masterminded the invasion of the moons. When a portal to Earth opens, the marine steps through to discover that Earth has been invaded. "Thy Flesh Consumed" follows the marine battling the Earth invaders, setting the stage for Doom II.

== Development ==
=== Concept ===
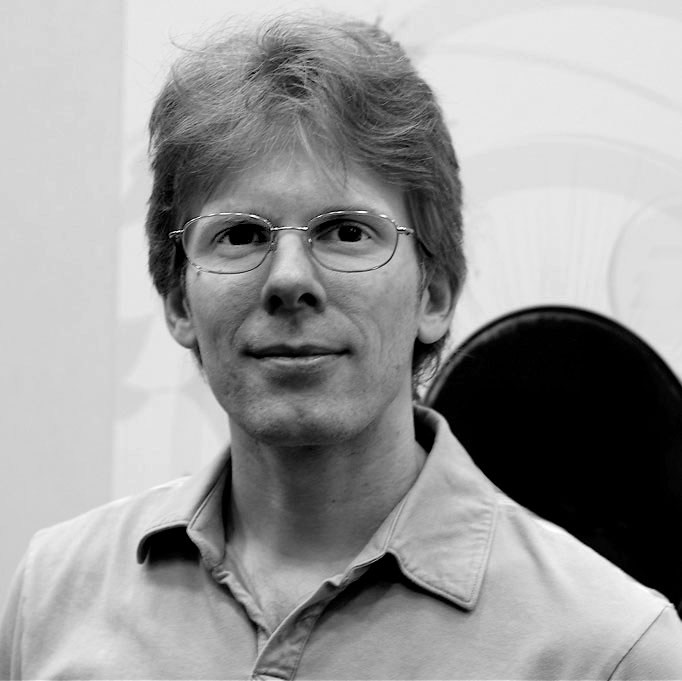
John Carmack in 2006

Id Software released Wolfenstein 3D in May 1992. Later called the "grandfather of 3D shooters", it established the genre's popularity and its reputation for fast action and technological advancement. When most of the studio began work on additional episodes for Wolfenstein, id co-founder and lead programmer John Carmack instead began technical research on a new game. Following the release of Wolfenstein 3D: Spear of Destiny in September 1992, the team began to plan their next game. They were tired of Wolfenstein and wanted to create another 3D game using a new engine Carmack was developing. Co-founder and lead designer Tom Hall proposed a new game in the Commander Keen series, but the team decided that the Keen platforming gameplay was a poor fit for Carmack's fast-paced 3D engines. Additionally, the other co-founders, designer John Romero and lead artist Adrian Carmack (no relation to John Carmack) wanted to create something in a darker style than the Keen games.

John Carmack conceived a game about using technology to fight demons, inspired by a Dungeons & Dragons campaign the team played. This campaign would also influence the design of Quake (1996) and Daikatana (2000). More broadly the team intended to combine the styles of the Evil Dead II and Aliens films. The working title was Green and Pissed, but Carmack renamed it Doom based on a line from the 1986 film The Color of Money: "'What you got in there?' / 'In here? Doom.'"

The team agreed to pursue the Doom concept, and development began in November 1992. The initial development team was composed of five people: programmers John Carmack and Romero, artists Adrian Carmack and Kevin Cloud, and designer Hall. They moved operations to a dark office building, naming it "Suite 666" while drawing inspiration from the noises they heard from a neighboring dental practice. They also decided to cut ties with Apogee Software, their previous publisher, and self-publish Doom, as they felt that they were outgrowing the publisher and could make more money by self-publishing.

=== Design ===
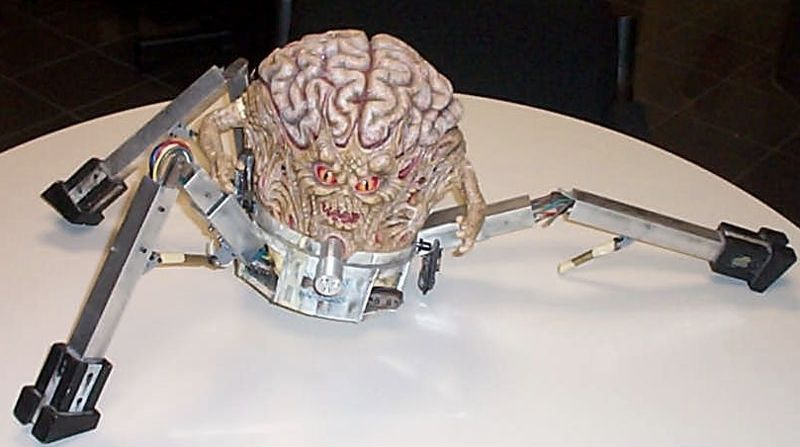
Model of the Spider Mastermind created for the game by Gregor Punchatz

In November, Hall delivered a design document that he called the "Doom Bible", detailing the project's plot, backstory, and design goals. His design was a science fiction horror concept wherein scientists on the Moon open a portal to an alien invasion. Over a series of levels, the player discovers that the aliens are demons while hell steadily infects the level design. John Carmack not only disliked the proposed story but dismissed the idea of having a story at all: "Story in a game is like story in a porn movie; it's expected to be there, but it's not that important." Rather than a deep story, he wanted to focus on technological innovation, dropping the levels and episodes of Wolfenstein in favor of a fast, continuous world. Hall disliked the idea, but the rest of the team sided with Carmack. Hall spent the next few weeks reworking the Doom Bible to work with Carmack's technological ideas. However, the team then realized that Carmack's vision for a seamless world would be impossible given the hardware limitations, and Hall was forced to rework the design document once again.

At the start of 1993, id put out a press release, touting Hall's story about fighting off demons while "knee-deep in the dead". The press release proclaimed the new 3D engine features that John Carmack had created, as well as aspects including multiplayer, that had not yet even been designed. Early versions were built to match the Doom Bible, and a "pre-alpha" version of the first level included Hall's introductory base scene. Initial versions also retained Wolfenstein's arcade-style scoring, but this was later removed as it clashed with Doom's intended tone. The studio also experimented with other game systems before removing them, such as lives, an inventory, a secondary shield, and a complex user interface.

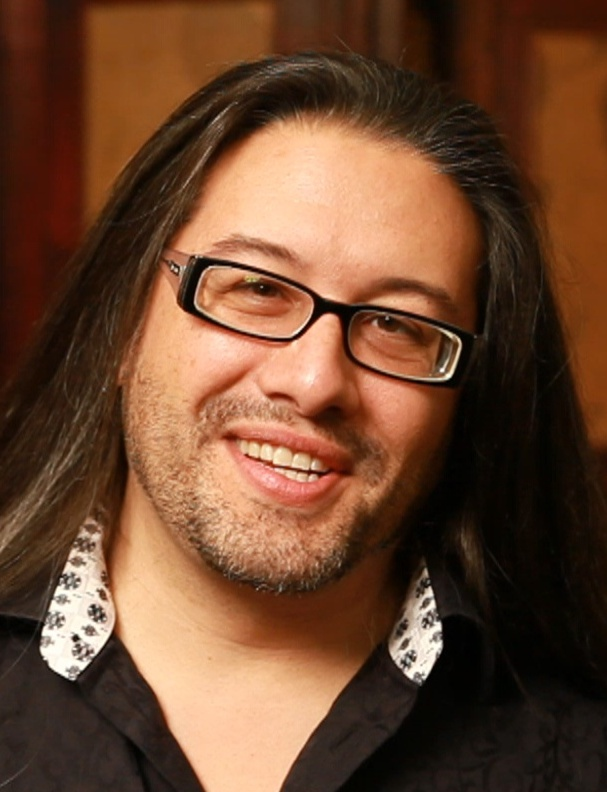
John Romero in 2012

Soon, however, the Doom Bible as a whole was rejected. Romero wanted a game even "more brutal and fast" than Wolfenstein, which did not leave room for the character-driven plot Hall had created. Additionally, the team believed it emphasized realism over entertaining gameplay, and they did not see the need for a design document at all. Some ideas were retained, but the story was dropped and most of the design was removed. By early 1993, Hall created levels that became part of an internal demo. Carmack and Romero, however, rejected the military architecture of Hall's level design. Romero especially believed that the boxy, flat level designs failed to innovate on Wolfenstein, and failed to show off the engine's capabilities. He began to create his own, more abstract levels, which the rest of the team saw as a great improvement.

Hall was upset with the reception of his designs and how little impact he was having as the lead designer. He was also upset with how much he was having to fight with John Carmack to get what he saw as obvious gameplay improvements, such as flying enemies, and began to spend less time at work. The other developers, however, felt that Hall was not in sync with the team's vision and was becoming a problem. In July the other founders of id fired Hall, who went to work for Apogee. He was replaced by Sandy Petersen in September, ten weeks before the game was released. Petersen later recalled that John Carmack and Romero wanted to hire other artists instead, but Cloud and Adrian disagreed, saying that a designer was required to help build a cohesive gameplay experience. The team also added a third programmer, Dave Taylor.

Petersen and Romero designed the rest of Doom's levels, with different aims: the team believed that Petersen's designs were more technically interesting and varied, while Romero's were more aesthetically interesting. In late 1993, a month before release, John Carmack began to add multiplayer. After the multiplayer component was coded, the development team began playing four-player games, which Romero termed "deathmatch", and Cloud named the act of killing other players "fragging". According to Romero, the deathmatch mode was inspired by fighting games such as Street Fighter II, Fatal Fury, and Art of Fighting.

=== Engine ===
Doom was written largely in the C programming language, with a few elements in assembly language. The developers used NeXT computers running the NeXTSTEP operating system. The level and graphical data was stored in WAD files, short for "Where's All the Data?", separately from the engine. This allowed for any part of the design to be changed without needing to adjust the engine code. Carmack designed this system so that fans could easily modify the game; he had been impressed by the modifications made by fans of Wolfenstein 3D and wanted to support that by releasing a map editor with an easily swappable file structure.

Unlike Wolfenstein, which has flat levels with walls at right angles, the Doom engine allows for walls and floors at any angle or height but does not allow areas to be stacked vertically. The lighting system is based on adjusting the color palette of surfaces directly. Rather than calculating how light traveled from light sources to surfaces using ray tracing, the game calculates the "light level" of a small area based on the predetermined brightness of said area. It then modifies the color palette of that section's surface textures to mimic how dark it would look. This same system is used to cause far away surfaces to look darker than close ones.

Romero came up with new ways to use Carmack's lighting engine, such as strobe lights. He programmed engine features such as switches and movable stairs and platforms. After Romero's complex level designs started to cause problems with the engine, Carmack began to use binary space partitioning to quickly select the reduced portion of a level that the player could see at a given time. Taylor, along with programming other features, added cheat codes to aid in development and left them in for players.

=== Art direction ===
Adrian Carmack was the lead artist for Doom, with Kevin Cloud as an additional artist. They designed the monsters to be "nightmarish", with graphics that were realistic and dark instead of staged or rendered. A mixed media approach was taken to create them. The artists sculpted models of some of the enemies and took pictures of them in stop motion from five to eight different angles so that they could be rotated realistically in-game. The images were then digitized and converted to 2D characters with a program written by John Carmack. Adrian Carmack made clay models for a few demons and had Gregor Punchatz build latex and metal sculptures of the others. The weapons were made from combined parts of children's toys. The developers photographed themselves as well, using Cloud's arm for the marine's arm holding a gun, and Adrian's snakeskin boots and wounded knee for textures. The cover art was created by Don Ivan Punchatz, Gregor Punchatz's father, who worked from a short description of the game rather than detailed references. Romero was the body model used for the cover; he posed during a photoshoot to demonstrate to the intended model what the pose should look like, and Punchatz used his photo.

As with Wolfenstein 3D, id hired composer Robert Prince to create the music and sound effects. Romero directed Prince to make the music in techno and metal styles. Many tracks were directly inspired by songs by metal bands such as Alice in Chains and Pantera. Prince believed that ambient music would be more appropriate and produced numerous tracks in both styles in hope of convincing the team, and Romero incorporated both. Prince did not make music for specific levels, as they were composed before the levels were completed. Instead, Romero assigned each track to each level late in development. Prince created the sound effects based on short descriptions or concept art of a monster or weapon and adjusted them to match the completed animations. The monster sounds were created from animal noises, and Prince designed all the sounds to be distinct on the limited sound hardware of the time, even when many sounds were playing at once. He also designed the sound effects to play on different frequencies from those used for the MIDI music, so they would clearly cut through the music.

== Release ==
Id Software planned to self-publish Doom for DOS-based computers and set up a distribution system leading up to the release. Jay Wilbur, who had been hired as CEO and sole member of the business team, planned the marketing and distribution of Doom. As id would make the most money from copies they sold directly to customers—up to 85% of the planned US$40 price—he decided to leverage the shareware market as much as possible. He believed that the mainstream press was uninterested in the game and bought only a single ad in any gaming magazine. Instead, he gave software retailers the option to sell copies of the first Doom episode at any price, in hopes of motivating customers to buy the full game directly from id. In 2004, John Carmack estimated that the total cost of development was less than US$1 million.

The team planned to release Doom in the third quarter of 1993 but ultimately needed more time. By December 1993, the team was working non-stop, with several employees sleeping at the office. Taylor said that the work gave him such a rush that he would pass out from the intensity. Id only gave a single press preview, to Computer Gaming World in June, to a glowing response, but had also released development updates to the public continuously throughout development on the nascent internet. Id began receiving calls from people interested in the game or angry that it had missed its planned release date, as anticipation built over the year. At midnight on December 10, 1993, after working for 30 straight hours testing, the development team at id uploaded the first episode to the internet, letting interested players distribute it for them. The team was unable to connect to the FTP server at the University of Wisconsin–Madison where they planned to upload the game, since there were so many users already connected in anticipation of the release. The network administrator was forced to first increase the number of connections, and then kick off all users to make room. When the upload finished 30 minutes later, 10,000 people attempted to download the game at once, crashing the university's network.

Within hours of Doom's release, university networks began banning Doom multiplayer games, as a rush of players overwhelmed their systems. The morning after release, John Carmack quickly released a patch in response to complaints of network congestion from administrators, who still needed to implement Doom-specific rules to keep their networks from crashing from the load.

=== Ports ===
To promote Windows 95, Microsoft CEO Bill Gates showcased a video presentation while digitally superimposed into Doom.

In 1995, id created an expanded version of Doom for the retail market with a fourth episode of levels, which was published by GT Interactive as The Ultimate Doom. Doom has also been ported to numerous different platforms, independent from id Software. The first port of Doom was an unofficial port to Linux, released by id programmer Dave Taylor in 1994; it was hosted by id but not supported or made official. Microsoft attempted to hire id to port Doom to Windows in 1995 to promote Windows as a gaming platform, and Microsoft CEO Bill Gates briefly considered buying the company. When id declined, Microsoft made its own licensed port, with a team led by Gabe Newell. One promotional video for Windows 95 had Gates digitally superimposed into the game.

Other official ports of Doom were released for the 32X and Atari Jaguar in 1994, Super NES and PlayStation in 1995, 3DO in 1996, Sega Saturn in 1997, Acorn Risc PC in 1998, Game Boy Advance in 2001, Xbox 360 in 2006, iOS in 2009, and Nintendo Switch, Xbox One, PlayStation 4, and Android in 2019, with the latter-most platforms (excluding Android) receiving a further expanded port alongside Doom II in 2024 along with ports for the PlayStation 5 and Xbox Series X/S, alongside the 2016 "IDKFA" arranged soundtrack by Andrew Hulshult. Some of these became bestsellers even many years after the initial release. The ports did not all have the same content, with some having fewer levels, such as the 32X port created by John Carmack, which was released with only two-thirds of the game's levels in order to meet the console's launch date, while the PlayStation port includes The Ultimate Doom and Doom II.

The source code for Doom was released under a non-commercial license in 1997, and freely released under the GNU General Public License in 1999. Due to the release of its source code, Doom has been unofficially ported to numerous platforms. These ports include esoteric devices such as smart thermostats, pianos, and Doom itself, which led to variations of a long-running meme, "Can it run Doom?" and "It runs Doom".

== Reception ==
=== Sales ===
Upon its release in December 1993, Doom became an "overnight phenomenon". It was an immediate financial success for id, making a profit within a day after release. Although the company estimated that only 1% of shareware downloaders bought the full game, this was enough to generate initial daily revenue of US$100,000, selling in one day what Wolfenstein had sold in one month. By May 1994, Wilbur said that the game had sold over 65,000 copies, and estimated that the shareware version had been distributed over 1 million times. In 1995, Wilbur estimated the first-year sales as 140,000, while in 2002 Petersen said it had sold around 200,000 copies in its first year.

By late 1995, Doom was estimated to be installed on more computers worldwide than Microsoft's new operating system, Windows 95. According to Wilbur, by June 1996 it had been downloaded 20 million times. According to PC Data, by April 1998 Doom's shareware edition had yielded 1.36 million units sold and US$8.74 million in revenue in the United States. This led PC Data to declare it the country's 4th-best-selling computer game since 1993. The Ultimate Doom sold over 780,000 units by September 1999, and all versions combined sold 3.5 million copies by the end of 1999. In addition to sales, an estimated six million people played the shareware version by 2002; other sources estimated in 2000 that 10–20 million people played Doom within 24 months of its launch.

=== Reviews ===
Doom was highly praised in contemporaneous reviews. In April 1994, a few months after release, PC Gamer UK named it the third-best computer game of all time, claiming "Doom has already done more to establish the PC's arcade clout than any other title in gaming history," and PC Gamer US named it the best computer game of all time that August. It won the Best Action Adventure award at Cybermania '94. GamesRadar UK named Doom Game of the Year in 1993 shortly after release, and Computer Gaming World and PC Gamer UK did the same the year after.

Reviewers heavily praised the single-player gameplay: Electronic Entertainment called it "a skull-banging, palm-sweating, blood-pounding game", while The Age said it was "a technically superb and thrilling 3D adventure". White Wolf's reviewer found it addictive, claiming to miss sleep and appointments to continue playing. PC Zone called it the best arcade game ever, and it and Computer Gaming World praised the variety of monsters and weapons. Computer Gaming World concluded that it was "a virtuoso performance". Other reviewers, while also praising the gameplay, commented on the lack of complexity: Computer and Video Games found it captivating and praised the variety and complexity of the level design but called the overall gameplay repetitive, while Dragon similarly praised the fast gameplay and level design but said that overall it lacked depth. Edge praised the graphics and levels but criticized the straightforward shooting gameplay. The review concluded: "If only you could talk to these creatures, then perhaps you could try and make friends with them, form alliances... Now, that would be interesting." The review attracted mockery and "if only you could talk to these creatures" became a running joke in video game culture. The multiplayer gameplay garnered praise: Computer Gaming World called it "the most intense gaming experience available", and Dragon called it "the biggest adrenaline rush available on computers". PC Zone named it as the best multiplayer game available, in addition to the best arcade game.

The 3D graphics and art style earned glowing reviews as well; Computer Gaming World called the graphics remarkable, while Edge said that it "made serious advances in what people will expect of 3D graphics in future", surpassing not only prior games but games that had yet to be released. Compute! and Electronic Games similarly called the graphics excellent and unlike any other game's. PC Zone, Dragon, Computer Gaming World, and Electronic Entertainment all lauded the atmosphere and art direction, saying that the level design, lighting effects, and sound effects combined to create a "claustrophobic" and "nightmarish experience". Computer Gaming World also praised the music, as did The Mercury News, which called it as "ominous as the scenario".

=== Other versions ===
The Ultimate Doom received mixed reviews upon its release in 1995, as in the review from PC Zone, which gave it a score of 90/100 for new players but 20/100 for anyone who had the original game. The reviewer viewed it as solely a level pack due to the lack of new features and compared it negatively to the hundreds of free fan-made levels available on the internet. Joystick disliked the limited amount of additional content and recommended it only to major fans or those who had not played it. Fusion reviewed the edition positively, praising the difficulty of the new levels, as did GameSpot, which reviewed it from the perspective of introducing the game to new players.

The first ports of Doom received comparable reviews to the original PC version. VideoGames, GamePro, and Computer and Video Games all gave the Jaguar version high scores, comparing it favorably with the PC version. GamePro and Computer and Video Games also rated the 32X version highly, though they noted that the graphics were worse and the game shorter than the PC or Jaguar versions. The 1995 ports received mixed reviews. The PlayStation version was rated highly by HobbyConsolas, GamePro, and Maximum, which praised the inclusion of Doom II and extra levels, and favorably compared it to other PlayStation shooter games. The Super NES version, however, was noted for weaker graphics and unresponsive controls, though reviewers such as Computer and Video Games, GamePro, and Next Generation were split on awarding high or middling scores due to these faults. Later 1990s ports received worse reviews; the 3DO port was panned by GamePro and Maximum for having worse graphics, a smaller screen size, and less intelligent enemies than any previous version, and the Sega Saturn port also met with low reviews for poor graphics and low quality from Mean Machines and Sega Saturn Magazine.

== Legacy ==
Doom has been termed "inarguably the most important" first-person shooter, as well as the "father" of the genre. Although not the first in the genre, it was the game with the greatest impact. Dan Pinchbeck in Doom: Scarydarkfast (2013) noted the direct influence of Doom's design choices on those of first-person and third-person shooter games two decades later, as influenced by the games released in the intervening years.

Doom, and to a lesser extent Wolfenstein 3D, has been characterized as "mark[ing] a turning point" in the perception of video games in popular culture, with Doom and first-person shooters in general becoming the predominant perception of video games in media. Historians such as Tristan Donovan in Replay: The History of Video Games (2010) have termed it as causing a "paradigm shift", prompting the rise in popularity of 3D games, first-person shooters, licensed technology between developers, and support for game modifications. It helped spark the rise of both online multiplayer games and player-driven content generation, and popularized the business model of online distribution. In their book Dungeons & Dreamers: A Story of how Computer Games Created a Global Community in 2014, Brad King and John Borland claimed that Doom was one of the first widespread instances of an "online collective virtual reality", and did more than any other game to create a modern world of "networked games and gamers". PC Gamer proclaimed Doom the most influential game of all time in 2004, and in 2023 said its development was one of the most well-documented in the history of video games.

It has also been used in scholarly research since its release, including for machine learning, video game aesthetics and design, and the effects of video games on aggression, memory, and attention. In 2026, Australian researchers trained 200,000 human brain cells as an organic computer to play Doom. In 2007 Doom was listed among the ten "game canon" video games selected for preservation by the Library of Congress, and in 2015 The Strong National Museum of Play inducted Doom to its World Video Game Hall of Fame as part of its initial set of games. In 2026, the game's soundtrack was selected by the Library of Congress for preservation in the National Recording Registry for having "cultural, historical or aesthetic importance in the nation's recorded sound heritage".

Doom has continued to be included highly in lists of the best video games ever since its release. In 1995, Next Generation said it was "the most talked about PC game ever". The PC version was ranked the 3rd best video game by Flux in 1995, and in 1996 was ranked fifth best and third most innovative by Computer Gaming World. In 2000, Doom was ranked as the second-best game ever by GameSpot. The following year, it was voted the number one game of all time in a poll among over 100 game developers and journalists conducted by GameSpy, and was ranked the sixth best game by Game Informer. GameTrailers ranked it the most "breakthrough PC game" in 2009 and Game Informer again ranked it the sixth-best game that same year. Doom has also been ranked among the best games of all time by GamesMaster, Hyper, The Independent, Entertainment Weekly, GamesTM, Jeuxvideo.com, Gamereactor, Time, Polygon, and The Times, among others, as recently as 2023.

=== Clones ===
By 1998, the phrase "first-person shooter" had firmly superseded "Doom clone".

The success of Doom led to dozens of new first-person shooter games. In 1998, PC Gamer declared it "probably the most imitated game of all time". These games were often referred to as "Doom clones", with "first-person shooter" only overtaking it as the name of the genre after a few years. As the "first-person shooter" genre label had not yet solidified at the time, Doom was described as a "first person perspective adventure" and "atmospheric 3-D action game".

Doom clones ranged from close imitators to more innovative takes on the genre. Id Software licensed the Doom engine to several other companies, which resulted in several games similar to Doom, including Heretic (1994), Hexen: Beyond Heretic (1995), and Strife: Quest for the Sigil (1996). A Doom-based game called Chex Quest was released in 1996 by Ralston Foods as a promotion to increase cereal sales. Other games were inspired by Doom, if not rumored to be built by reverse engineering the game's engine, including LucasArts's Star Wars: Dark Forces (1995). Several other games termed Doom clones, such as PowerSlave (1996) and Duke Nukem 3D (1996), used the 1995 Build engine, a 2.5D engine inspired by Doom created by Ken Silverman with some consultation with John Carmack.

=== Sequel and franchise ===
After completing Doom, id Software began working on a sequel using the same engine, Doom II, which was released to retail on October 10, 1994, ten months after the first game. GT Interactive had approached id before the release of Doom with plans to release a retail version of Doom and Doom II. Id chose to create the sequel as a set of episodes rather than a new game, allowing John Carmack and the other programmers to begin work on id's next game, Quake. Doom II was the United States' highest-selling software product of 1994 and sold more than 1.2 million copies within a year.

Doom II was followed by an expansion pack from id, Master Levels for Doom II (1995), consisting of 21 commissioned levels and over 3000 user-created levels for Doom and Doom II. Two sets of Doom II levels by different amateur map-making teams were released together by id as the standalone game Final Doom (1996). Doom and Doom II were both included, along with previous id games, in the id Anthology compilation (1996). The Doom franchise has continued since the 1990s in several iterations and forms. The video game series includes Doom 3 (2004), Doom (2016), and Doom Eternal (2020), along with other spin-off video games. It additionally includes multiple novels, a comic book, board games, and two films: Doom (2005) and Doom: Annihilation (2019).

=== Controversies ===
Doom's intense level of graphic violence, as seen in this gory effect of a rocket hitting a group of demons, made the game highly controversial.

Doom was notorious for its high levels of graphic violence and satanic imagery, which generated controversy from a broad range of groups. Doom for the 32X was one of the first video games to be given a Mature 17+ rating from the Entertainment Software Rating Board due to its violent gore and nature, while Doom II was the first. In Germany, shortly after its publication, Doom was classified as "harmful to minors" by the Federal Department for Media Harmful to Young Persons and could not be sold to children or displayed where they could see it, which was only rescinded in 2011.

Doom again sparked controversy in the United States when it was found that Eric Harris and Dylan Klebold, who committed the Columbine High School massacre on April 20, 1999, were avid players. While planning for the massacre, Harris said in his journal that the killing would be "like playing Doom". A rumor spread afterward that Harris had designed a custom Doom level that looked like the high school, populated with representations of Harris's classmates and teachers, which he used to practice for the shooting. Although Harris did design several custom Doom levels, which later became known as the "Harris levels", none were based on the school. Doom was dubbed a "mass murder simulator" by critic and Killology Research Group founder David Grossman.

In the earliest release versions, the level E1M4: Command Control contains a swastika-shaped structure, which was put in as a homage to Wolfenstein 3D. The swastika was removed in later versions, out of respect for a military veteran's request, according to Romero.

=== Community ===
Doom's popularity and innovations attracted a community that has persisted for decades since. The deathmatch mode was an important factor in its popularity. Doom was the first game to coin the term "deathmatch" and introduced multiplayer shooting battles to a wide audience. This led to a widespread community of players who had never experienced fast-paced multiplayer combat before.

Another popular aspect of Doom was the versatility of its WAD files, enabling user-generated levels and other game modifications. John Carmack and Romero had strongly advocated for mod support, overriding other id employees who were concerned about commercial and legal implications. Although WAD files exposed the game data, id provided no instructions for how they worked. Still, players were able to modify leaked alpha versions of the game, allowing them to release level editors within weeks of the game's release.

On January 26, 1994, university student Brendon Wyber led a group to create the first full level editor, the Doom Editor Utility, leading to the first custom level by Jeff Bird in March. It was followed by "countless" others, including many based on other franchises like Aliens and Star Wars total conversion mods, as well as DeHackEd, a patch editor first released in 1994 by Greg Lewis that allowed editing of the game engine. Soon after the first mods appeared, id CEO Wilbur posted legal terms to the company's website, allowing mod authors to charge money without any fees to id, while also absolving the company of responsibility or support.

Doom mods were widely popular, earning favorable comparisons to the official level additions seen in The Ultimate Doom. Thousands of user-created levels were released in the first few years after the release; over 3000 such levels for Doom and Doom II were included in the official retail release Master Levels for Doom II (1995). WizardWorks released multiple collections of mods of Doom and Doom II under the name D!Zone. At least one mod creator, Tim Willits, was later hired at id Software. Mods have continued to be produced, with the community Cacowards awarding the best of each year. In 2016, Romero created two new Doom levels: E1M4b ("Phobos Mission Control") and E1M8b ("Tech Gone Bad"). In 2018, for the 25th anniversary of Doom, Romero announced Sigil, an unofficial fifth episode containing nine levels. It was released on May 22, 2019, for €6.66 with a soundtrack by Buckethead, and then released again for free on May 31 with a soundtrack by James Paddock. A physical release was later produced. A sixth episode, Sigil II, was released on the game's 30th anniversary, December 10, 2023, again for €6.66 for a digital copy with a soundtrack by Valient Thorr, as well as physical editions on floppy disk.

In addition to WAD files, Doom includes a feature that allowed players to record and play back gameplay using files called demos, or game replays. Although the concept of speedrunning a video game existed before Doom, its release coincided with a wave of popularity for speedrunning, amplified by the online communities built on the nascent Internet. Demos were lightweight files that could be shared more easily than video files on internet bulletin board systems at the time. As a result, Doom is credited with creating the video game speedrunning community. The speedrunning community for Doom has continued for decades. As recently as 2019, community members have broken records originally set in 1998. Doom has been termed as having "one of the longest-running speedrunning communities" as well as being "the quintessential speedrunning game".

== Sources ==
- Consalvo, Mia (2016). Atari to Zelda: Japan's Videogames in Global Contexts. MIT Press. ISBN 978-0-262-03439-5.
- Donovan, Tristan (2010). Replay: The History of Video Games. Yellow Ant. ISBN 978-0-9565072-0-4.
- Dunnigan, James F. (2000). Wargames Handbook: How to Play and Design Commercial and Professional Wargames (3rd ed.). Writers Club Press. ISBN 978-0-595-15546-0.
- Hawken, Kieren (2017). The A-Z of Atari Jaguar Games – Volume 1. Andrews UK. ISBN 978-1-78538-734-0.
- King, Brad; Borland, John (2014). Dungeons & Dreamers: A Story of how Computer Games Created a Global Community (2nd ed.). ETC Press. ISBN 978-0-9912227-2-8.
- Kushner, David (2004). Masters of Doom: How Two Guys Created an Empire and Transformed Pop Culture. Random House. ISBN 978-0-8129-7215-3.
- Mendoza, Jonathan (1994). The Official DOOM Survivor's Strategies and Secrets. Sybex. ISBN 978-0-7821-1546-8.
- O'Connell, Brian (1999). Gen E: Generation Entrepreneur is Rewriting the Rules of Business. Entrepreneur Press. ISBN 978-1-891984-07-5.
- Pinchbeck, Dan (2013). Doom: Scarydarkfast. University of Michigan Press. ISBN 978-0-472-05191-5.
- Romero, John (2023). Doom Guy: Life in First Person. Harry N. Abrams. ISBN 978-1-4197-5811-9.
- Slaven, Andy (2002). Video Game Bible, 1985-2002. Trafford Publishing. ISBN 978-1-55369-731-2.
- Snyder, David (2017). Speedrunning: Interviews with the Quickest Gamers. McFarland & Company. ISBN 978-1-4766-3076-2.
