= Rachel B. Glaser =

Rachel B. Glaser is an American poet, novelist and short story writer.

== Early life and education ==
Glaser was born in New Jersey. She obtained an undergraduate degree in painting from the Rhode Island School of Design and later graduated from the UMass-Amherst Poets and Writers Program in Fiction.

== Works ==
She has published four books to date: Pee On Water (short stories), Moods (poetry), Hairdo (poetry), and Paulina and Fran (novel). Publishers Weekly praised Hairdo for "Glaser's funny, shrewd, and warped perspective". Paulina and Fran was positively received. Glaser's short story, "Dead Woman," appeared in the Summer 2023 issue of the Paris Review.

== Recognition ==
Glaser was named as one of the best young American novelists by Granta magazine in 2017.
