= Rafael Frumkin =

American fiction writer

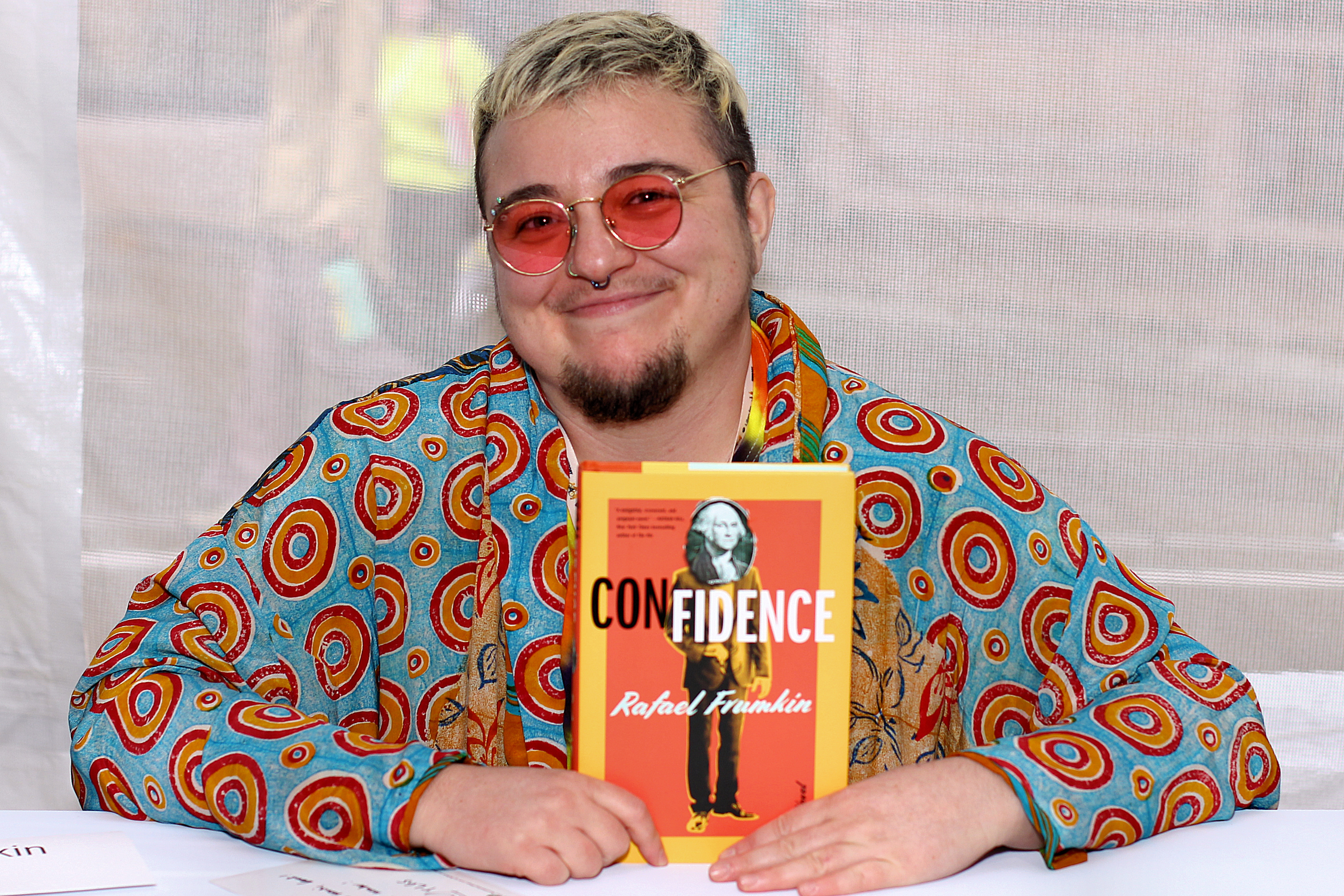
- Rafael Frumkin at the 2023 Texas Book Festival
- Education: Carleton College, Northwestern University, University of Iowa
- Occupation: Writer
- Writing career
- Genre: Fiction
- Notable work: The Comedown
- Website: rfrumkin.com

Rafael Frumkin is an American novelist and the author of The Comedown and Confidence (2023). The Comedown, which she published under Rebekah Frumkin, is being developed as a Starz TV series by Regina King and Freddie Highmore. Frumkin is a self described "testoform lesbian" who briefly identified as transgender.

== Education ==
Frumkin obtained her bachelor’s degree at Carleton College, an MFA from the Iowa Writers' Workshop and a master's at the Medill School of Journalism at Northwestern University. She was assistant professor of English at Southern Illinois University and is now a full-time writer. Frumkin creates content and shares her publications online.

== Literary career ==
Frumkin's debut novel, The Comedown, was published by Henry Holt & Company in 2018. The New York Times Book Review wrote:

The book isn’t necessarily interested in solving its central mystery; what it wants to do instead is emphatically contextualize it. Frumkin doesn’t simply explain a crime; she examines every life the crime touched. Which means a lot of digression. And this might be tiresome if the digressions weren’t so good, so fully realized and meticulously, skillfully rendered.

For The Los Angeles Review of Books, "The scope of The Comedown is such that everyone is in close proximity to a tragedy at all times. Frumkin’s juxtaposition makes it clear that what these characters do to one another in the book is both awful and perfectly human." The Millions called it "a fundamentally comic novel (and a very funny one at that)", writing: "All of her characters are rendered with depth, portrayed with amusement and affection. Frumkin’s witty, third-person voice is as comfortable with the drug-dealing Reggie Marshall as it is his Melville scholar wife, Tasha."

Frumkin's second novel, Confidence, her first since transitioning to a self described "testoform lesbian" and changing names from Rebekah to Rafael, was published by Simon & Schuster in 2023. The Washington Post called it "a propulsive, cheeky, eat-the-rich page-turner to satisfy the craving for a well-crafted caper."

== Publications ==
- The Comedown (Henry Holt & Company, 2018)
- Confidence (Simon & Schuster, 2023)
- Bugsy & Other Stories (Simon & Schuster, 2024)
