= Gregor Punchatz =

American sculptor

Gregor Punchatz (born 1967) is an artist hired by id Software to create sculptures for the Arch-Vile, Mancubus, Revenant and Spider Mastermind monsters for the Doom video game series. He built these models using steel armatures and foam latex.

Before working on the Doom models he did similar modelling work for a number of Hollywood movies, including A Nightmare on Elm Street 2, RoboCop, and RoboCop 2. He was the animation director for Spy Kids 2.

Gregor is the son of Don Ivan Punchatz, who created the Doom package art and logo. He lives in Dallas, Texas.
