= Riverworld (disambiguation) =

Riverworld is a series of science-fiction novels by Philip José Farmer.

It has been adapted to several forms of media, including:

- Riverworld (2003 film), a pilot episode for a Sci-Fi channel series that was never produced
- Riverworld (2010 film), a television film on the SyFy channel, a reboot of the 2003 film
- Riverworld (video game), a 1998 PC game adapted from the novel series
