= List of science fiction television programs, R =

This is an inclusive list of science fiction television programs whose names begin with the letter R.

== R ==
Live-action

- Raised by Wolves (2020–2022)
- Rapt (2015, Ireland, mini-series)
- Raumpatrouille – Die phantastischen Abenteuer des Raumschiffes Orion (1966, Germany) a.k.a. Space Patrol – The Fantastic Adventures of the Spaceship Orion (US)
- Ray Bradbury Theatre (1985–1992, anthology)
- Read All About It! (1979–1983, Canada, educational)
- Real Humans (2012–2013, Sweden)
- Red Dwarf (1988–1999, 2009–present, UK)
- Red Faction: Origins (2011, pilot, film)
- Redman (1972, Japan)
- ReGenesis (2004–2008, Canada)
- Rentaghost (1976)
- Rescapés, Les a.k.a. Survivors, The (2010, Canada)
- Resident Alien (2021–present)
- Return to Jupiter (1997, Australia)
- Return to the Lost Planet (1955, UK) IMDb
- Revolution (2012–2014)
- Riverworld (franchise):
  - Riverworld (2003, film)
  - Riverworld (2010, film)
- Robin de Robot (1975, Belgium) IMDb
- RoboCop (franchise):
  - RoboCop: The Series (1994, Canada)
  - RoboCop: Prime Directives (2001, Canada, miniseries)
- Rocketship 7 (1962–1978, 1992–1993)
- Rocky Jones, Space Ranger (1954)
- Rod Brown of the Rocket Rangers (1953–1954)
- Roswell (1994, film)
- Roswell (franchise):
  - Roswell (1999–2002)
  - Roswell, New Mexico (2019–2022)

Animation

- R.O.D -THE TV- (2003–2004, Japan, animated)
- RahXephon (2002, Japan, animated)
- Ray the Animation (2006, Japan, animated)
- ReBoot (1994–2001, Canada, animated)
- Red Planet (1994, miniseries, animated)
- Red vs. Blue (2003, machinima, animated)
- Redakai: Conquer the Kairu a.k.a. Redakai (2011–2013, animated)
- Rick and Morty (2013–present, animated)
- Ripping Friends, The (2001–2002, US/Canada, animated)
- Road Rovers (1996–1997, animated)
- RoboCop (franchise):
  - RoboCop: The Animated Series (1988, animated)
  - RoboCop: Alpha Commando (1998–1999, animated)
- Roboroach (2002–2003, Canada, animated)
- Robotboy (2005–2008, UK/France/US, animated)
- Robotech (adaptation) (franchise):
  - Codename: Robotech (1985, US, animated, pilot)
  - Robotech (1985, 3 anime television series adaptation, US/Japan, animated)
  - Robotech II: The Sentinels (1986, US, Robotech sequel, pilot, animated)
- Robot Chicken (2005–present, stop-motion animation) (elements of science fiction in this and this episode)
- Robotix (1985, animated)
- Robotomy (2010, animated)
- Rocket Robin Hood (1966–1969, Canada, animated)
- Rod Rocket (1963, animated)
- RollBots (2009–2010, Canada/US, animated)
- Roswell Conspiracies: Aliens, Myths and Legends (1999–2000, animated)
- Roughnecks: Starship Troopers Chronicles (1999–2000, animated)
- Rainbow Rangers (2018-, animated)
