= Assault on Wall Street =

- Theatrical release poster
- Directed by: Uwe Boll
- Written by: Uwe Boll
- Produced by: Daniel Clarke
- Starring: Dominic Purcell; Erin Karpluk; Edward Furlong; John Heard; Keith David; Michael Paré; Eric Roberts
- Cinematography: Mathias Neumann
- Edited by: Thomas Sabinsky
- Music by: Jessica de Rooij
- Production companies: Event Film; Lynn Peak
- Distributed by: Phase 4 Films
- Release date: July 30, 2013
- Running time: 99 minutes
- Countries: United States; Canada
- Language: English

Assault on Wall Street (also known as Attack on Wall Street and formerly known as Bailout: The Age of Greed) is a 2013 action thriller film written and directed by Uwe Boll and starring Dominic Purcell, Erin Karpluk, Edward Furlong and Keith David. It tells the story of a security guard who struggles to pay for his wife's medical bills and loses his investments in the 2008 financial crisis, prompting a shooting spree on Wall Street after his wife takes her own life.

== Plot ==
During the 2008 financial crisis, a portfolio-manager instructs his employees to neglect the best interests of clients in order to increase company profits.

Meanwhile, Jim Baxford (Dominic Purcell), an armored car driver and former soldier, lives with his wife, Rosie, in New York City. Rosie is in the process of recovering from a near-fatal brain tumor. Their health insurance has reached its limit, and Jim finds that he is unable to afford her treatment. He decides to cash in the pension he earned from serving in the military, but learns that much of it is lost as a result of bad investments on the part of his financial adviser. In addition, he finds himself in a $60,000 lawsuit as a result of bad real-estate investments conducted by his rogue financial adviser.

Jim frequently lunches with a colleague in the armored car business, and two NYPD friends. He borrows $10,000 from the colleague to pay for an attorney to sue his financial adviser, and arranges a meeting with an assistant district attorney to discuss wrongdoings on the part of his financial advisers. However, the attorney he hired claims that he is unable to do anything and the assistant district attorney is unwilling to meet with him. Jim becomes frustrated at the loss of his money and his inability to pay for his wife's treatment and their mortgage. Because of his financial situation, his employer reluctantly fires him, as the company is not willing to trust him with large sums of money.

Rosie feels guilty for the financial strain that her illness has put on Jim and, unable to cope, commits suicide. Jim blames Wall Street financiers for ruining his life. Seeking vengeance, he purchases various firearms and grenades from an arms dealer, and begins a one-man army shooting spree on the Wall Street bosses that lost his money and contributed to the death of his wife. One by one, he kills those that have wronged him. Meeting with his friends at lunch, Jim casually admits to them that he is the Wall Street murderer. The three laugh it off, convinced he's joking.

The climax of the film has Jim staging a one-man assault and infiltration of a high-rise office building to confront and kill Jeremy Stancroft, a ruthless and greedy portfolio manager who is indirectly responsible for Jim's financial situation. Sitting at Jeremy's desk, Jim tells Jeremy why he is targeting him, of his corruption and asks why he should let Jeremy live. Jeremy defends his actions, saying that the famous rich people of history didn't get rich by honest work and that capitalism is a survival of the fittest society, where the "strong survive and the weak die off". Jim shows him a picture of his wife and tells Jeremy he's the reason his wife is dead. Shortly as SWAT begins to approach the office, Jim puts the gun on the table and counts to three. Jeremy grabs the gun when Jim gets to two, bragging about how he "won". Jim accuses him of cheating. Not caring, Jeremy pulls the trigger, only to realize that the gun is empty, for Jim cheated too. Just then, SWAT smashes the window and shoots Jeremy dead. Jim pretends to be an innocent wounded victim, having been shot in the arm by a security guard earlier, and is escorted away by SWAT, who is convinced Stancroft was the perpetrator.

A few minutes later, Jim stands in the lobby of the office building. He watches emergency personnel come and go, having just been treated for the gunshot wound to his arm. He is recognized there by his NYPD lunchmates, who had been called to the scene. Without a word, Jim is led out of the building by his friend to the street, to freedom. The film ends with Jim walking away, voicing over that he intends to continue his killing spree of white-collar businessmen elsewhere.

== Cast ==
- Dominic Purcell as Jim Baxford
- Erin Karpluk as Rosie Baxford
- Edward Furlong as Sean
- John Heard as Jeremy Stancroft
- Keith David as Freddy
- Michael Paré as Frank
- Lochlyn Munro as Robert Canworth
- Tyron Leitso as Spalding Smith
- Mike Dopud as Tom Allgard
- Barclay Hope as Ian Marwood
- Heather Feeney as Mary Jean
- Eric Roberts as Lawyer Louis Patterson
- Hiro Kanagawa as TV Host
- Michaela Mann as Myra
- Carrie Genzel as Debbie
- Jerry Trimble as Andy
- Clint Howard as Chuck Neehey
- Michael Eklund as MacKay
- Natassia Malthe as Molly

== Production ==
=== Background ===
Director Uwe Boll was inspired by a song by Distant 2nd called "Murder on Wall Street" and wrote scenes in the movie to incorporate ideas from the song. He began work on the film in 2010 and did a lot of research into the 2008 financial crisis. Around this time, Boll spoke with victims and people affected by the crisis and also started talking to a professor in the bailout commission in Germany.

=== Filming ===
Assault on Wall Street was shot on location in and around Vancouver, British Columbia, and also in New York City. Director Uwe Boll stated in an interview that even though he was given permission to shoot scenes in New York, he was not permitted to shoot in Central Park or the subway. Even though there were these obstacles whilst filming in New York, Boll states that he shot the movie "guerrilla style" and still filmed in places that he was unable to get a permit to film in. Boll stated that "The good thing is in New York, everybody is very busy so you don't have people paying a lot of attention to you if you shoot somewhere".

== Reception ==
The reaction to Assault on Wall Street has been mainly negative. On the review aggregator website Rotten Tomatoes, 25% of 8 critics' reviews are positive, with an average rating of 3.1/10. Metacritic, which uses a weighted average, assigned the film a score of 24 out of 100, based on 4 critics, indicating "generally unfavorable" reviews. Despite this, it was better received than most of Boll's films.
