= The Fabulous Riverboat =

1971 novel by Philip José Farmer

- First edition cover
- Author: Philip José Farmer
- Cover artist: Richard M. Powers
- Language: English
- Series: Riverworld
- Genre: Science fiction
- Publisher: Putnam Publishing Group
- Publication date: 1971
- Publication place: United States
- Media type: Print (Hardcover & Paperback)
- ISBN: 0-85391-197-5
- Preceded by: To Your Scattered Bodies Go
- Followed by: The Dark Design

The Fabulous Riverboat is a science fiction novel by American writer Philip José Farmer, the second book in the Riverworld series.

A shorter version of the novel was serialized in If magazine as "The Felled Star" (July and August 1967) and "The Fabulous Riverboat" (June and August 1971).

== Overview ==
Departing from the exploits of Captain Sir Richard Francis Burton in the first Riverworld novel, To Your Scattered Bodies Go, The Fabulous Riverboat follows the efforts of Samuel Clemens to find a way to build a riverboat on the metal-poor Riverworld. In the process, he confronts a tenth-century Viking, makes friends with a member of another hominid species and forms an uneasy alliance with King John Lackland.

== Plot summary ==
Twenty years after humanity was resurrected on Riverworld, Sam Clemens is traveling with the crew of a Viking longboat, captained by Eric Bloodaxe, who is notable for having an axe made of metal. On the metal-poor Riverworld, where even a few ounces of metal is a treasure, this is a rarity. Clemens and Bloodaxe have allied in order to find the source of this metal. Clemens is accompanied on his quest by a gigantic prehistoric hominid whom he has named Joe Miller. Miller, despite being very cordial, and talking with a lisp, is a fearsome warrior because of his size, and protects Clemens from Bloodaxe's crew. Clemens is also motivated in his quest by his desire to be reunited with his terrestrial wife, Livy.

Unknown to the others, Clemens had been contacted by a mysterious being whom he named X. X claimed to be a member of the beings who were responsible for resurrection, although he disagreed with their goals. He was aware of Clemens's desire to build a metal riverboat, and assured the author that the metal needed to realise this dream could be found upriver. X manages to send a nickel-iron meteorite crashing into Riverwold, not far from Clemens. Clemens and his crew manage to survive the resulting tidal wave that kills nearly everyone in the vicinity. Sadly, Clemens discovers Livy is one of the dead when her body washes up on deck. She had been in the area but will now be resurrected thousands of miles from him.

In the wake of the tidal wave all the survivors in the region are put to sleep by a strange fog, and awake to discover the valley has been restored to a pristine condition. Clemens realizes that the meteor likely contains a source of metal and the crew sets out to look for it. They are soon joined by German aviator Lothar von Richthofen, a World War One ace and brother of the famous Red Baron. Lothar becomes a trusted ally of Clemens and an additional ally against Bloodaxe.

When the crew reaches the area where the meteor fell, they find a new group of resurrectees who have formed a nascent kingdom. The crew quickly kill the leaders and assume control of the region for themselves. They begin mining the metal from the meteorite. However, Clemens does not trust Bloodaxe, and has his co-leader assassinated.

As more metal is exhumed from the ground the technology level of the area begins to rise, including the reintroduction of firearms. While the meteorite is rich in nickel and iron Clemens needs other materials to manufacture modern conveniences. To get these resources he must trade much of his metal to neighboring kingdoms. Many of these kingdoms eye his own kingdom jealously and Clemens is constantly on guard lest he be invaded and his precious mine taken from him. Of particular concern is a neighboring kingdom led by the English King John Lackland. Eventually King John and another kingdom join forces to invade Clemens's land. However, Clemens makes a deal with King John to unite their lands. John betrays his one-time ally and forms the nation of Parolando with Clemens.

As production begins on the boat, Clemens receives a rude shock when his wife arrives in the company of Cyrano de Bergerac. In the intervening years Livy has become Cyrano's lover. When the Frenchman, who is noted as one of the best swordsmen in the world, had heard of a kingdom with metal, he became obsessed with traveling there in order to obtain a proper sword. Despite his discomfort with the situation, Clemens quickly warms to Cyrano, and the Frenchman becomes part of Clemens' inner circle.

The protagonists meet a later time American astronaut Firebrass, who claims to have visited the Moon, Mars, Ganymede, and orbited Jupiter.

Diplomatic problems continue for Parolando, most notably with nearby "Soul City", a kingdom founded by a black nationalist. Demanding ever increasing payments for its resources, Soul City eventually attacks Parolando, almost conquering the nation until agents of John Lackland dynamite a dam, sending a wave of water to sweep the invading enemies into the river.

Despite such setbacks, Clemens builds his riverboat, a side paddle wheeler which is named the Not for Hire. However, on the day of its christening, King John betrays Clemens and steals the ship. As the boat steams away, Clemens vows to build an even bigger and better boat and to exact revenge on King John.

== Reception ==
Lester del Rey found the novel to be "a major piece of fiction. . . . Farmer pursuing one of his private delights to its ultimate end."

== See also ==
- Riverworld
