= The Portal (film) =

Canadian sci-fi, fantasy, comedy short film by Jonathan Williams

- Penikett on the set of The Portal
- Directed by: Jonathan Williams
- Written by: Jonathan Williams
- Produced by: Andrew Nicholas McCann Smith, Laura Perlmutter
- Starring: Tahmoh Penikett; Erin Karpluk
- Production company: First Love Films
- Release date: March 22, 2014 (Cleveland International Film Festival)
- Running time: 11 minutes
- Language: English

The Portal is a Canadian sci-fi, fantasy, comedy short film directed and written by Jonathan Williams. The short film stars Tahmoh Penikett and Erin Karpluk. The short film has been adapted into an ongoing web series titled Riftworld Chronicles (see below), which has won numerous awards.

== Plot ==
A dimension-traveling wizard gets stuck in 21st century Toronto because cell phone radiation interferes with his magic. With his home world on the brink of war, he seeks help from Kim, a travel agent who he mistakes for a great sorceress. Without his powers to prove his identity, she has trouble taking him seriously, but finally agrees to reveal the secrets of our world in exchange for a lunch date.

== Cast ==
- Tahmoh Penikett as Alar, a dimension-traveling wizard
- Erin Karpluk as Kim, a travel agent (in the short film), or struggling journalist (in the Riftworld series)

== Production ==
The Portal turned into a web series shot in the fall of 2014. On June 20, 2014 the Independent Production Fund announced that they would fund The Portal along with 16 other digital drama series.

== Riftworld Chronicles ==
The webseries that has been spun off the short is titled Riftworld Chronicles. As of July 2015, 8 episodes of circa 5–10 minutes each have been published, all of which were uploaded to the YouTube channel CBC Punchline owned by the Canadian Broadcasting Corporation, on 13 July 2015. New episodes will be produced based upon number of clicks on YouTube and/or on the official website.

There are a few notable differences between the short film and the series, the latter of which does not simply take off from where the short film ends. Rather, both are different takes on the same premise. The short covers circa 10 minutes more or less in real time, at the end of which Kim decides to follow Alar to his homeworld for a timespan that in our world appears as just her lunchtime, but when she returns as a learned sorceress from Alar's world, she has obviously lived there for a number of years and has a child circa aged 10 to whom she shows her homeworld. In the series, however, as of episode 8, she has never left our world and, while some intimate tension has occurred between them, still thinks of Alar as a harmless lunatic.

Other major differences include the fact that in the short, Kim is a travel agent, while in the series she is a journalist, and that in the series, she now has a somewhat immature, pothead and gamer brother with whom she lives. Her brother immediately clicks with the visitor whom he assumes to just be a fantasy cosplayer who's "taking things a bit far", and (besides the obvious culture shock and misunderstandings between Alar and other people about modern life on earth and his Medieval fantasy attitude and understanding of things) a number of jokes revolve around the fact that many things in Alar's world work just like they do in certain video games or fantasy cosplay subcultures that Kim's brother knows about and they exchange anecdotes of each other's "quests" as if they've known each other's worlds for years. Rather than Kim visiting Alar's world as she does at the end of the short, an assassin of a non-human race who is after Alar has arrived in ours during the most recent episodes, but as of episode 8, no close encounters have occurred yet other than Alar having seen the assassin from a window, now knowing about the second, more dangerous visitor to our realm. The assassin has broken into Kim and her brother's home and stolen her late mother's talisman, which at the end of episode 8 is revealed to potentially hold powers that as-of-now had been unknown to Kim.

== Release ==
On October 29, 2014 the short film was made available online at riftworldchronicles.com.

== Awards and nominations ==
Year	Award	Category	Recipients and nominees	Result
2014	Dragon Con Independent Film Festival	Fantasy		Won
2013/2014	Wizard World Film Festival - Grand Jury award			Won
2014	Directors Guild Of Canada Awards	Best Short Film		Nominated
2014	Salt Lake City Comic Con	Best Supporting Actress	Erin Karpluk	Won
