= Tahmoh Penikett =

Canadian actor (born 1975)

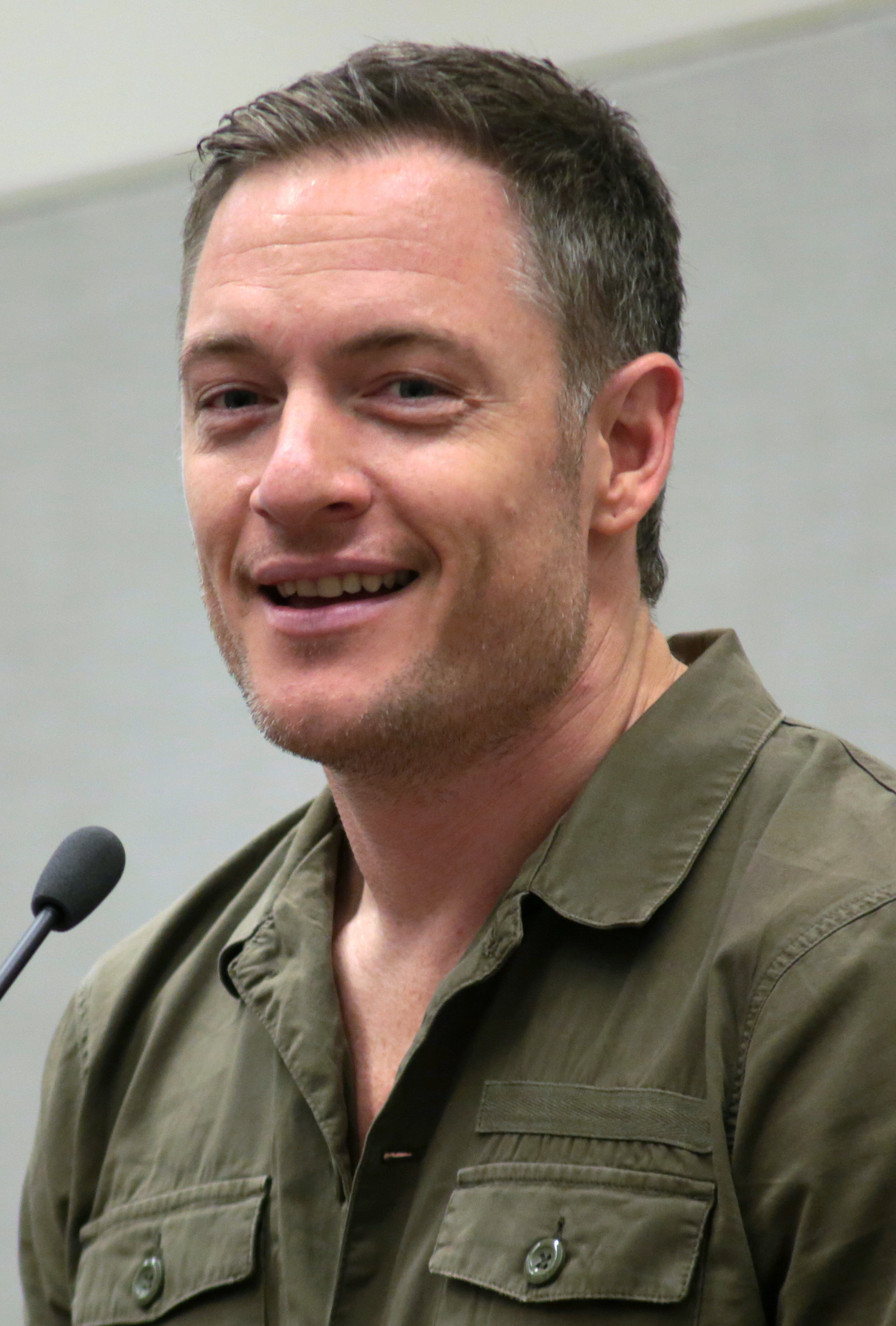
- Penikett at Phoenix Comicon in 2016
- Born: May 20, 1975 (age 51); Whitehorse, Yukon, Canada
- Occupation: Actor
- Years active: 1996–present

Tahmoh Penikett ([ˈtaʔmo]; /ˈpɛnɪkɪt/; born May 20, 1975) is a Canadian actor. He is known for playing Karl "Helo" Agathon on SyFy's 2004 television series Battlestar Galactica and Paul Ballard in the Fox series Dollhouse. He has appeared in TV series Supernatural, the Showcase time travel show Continuum, and as the antagonist Darius in the 2006 racing video game Need for Speed: Carbon.

== Early life ==
Penikett was born in Whitehorse, Yukon. He is the son of former Yukon premier Tony Penikett, who moved to Victoria, British Columbia from England at age 12, and Lulla Sierra Johns, an Upper Tanana woman from the White River First Nation in the Yukon. He has three siblings. He graduated from the Victoria Motion Picture School and studied at the Lyric School of Acting in Vancouver.

== Career ==
In 2002, he made a brief appearance as one of the first Human-Form Replicators in the season 6 episode of Stargate SG-1, "Unnatural Selection". From 2004 to 2005, Penikett portrayed Ray Chase, who appeared in eleven episodes of the Canadian police drama Cold Squad. He played a lead role as Noah Hamilton in the 2005 made-for-TV film Hush alongside actress Tori Spelling. He had a role in the video game Need for Speed: Carbon as a street racer named Darius. He also appeared in four episodes of the television series Whistler as Elias Noth. Penikett provided the voice for antagonist Troy Hammerschmidt in the Adult Swim show Titan Maximum. In 2010, Penikett played the lead role of Matt Ellman on Syfy's miniseries Riverworld, an adaptation of the science-fiction books written by Philip José Farmer of the same name. He starred in the first two episodes of Warner Bros' Mortal Kombat: Legacy as Kurtis Stryker, which debuted in April 2011 on YouTube; he was replaced by Eric Jacobus for season 2.

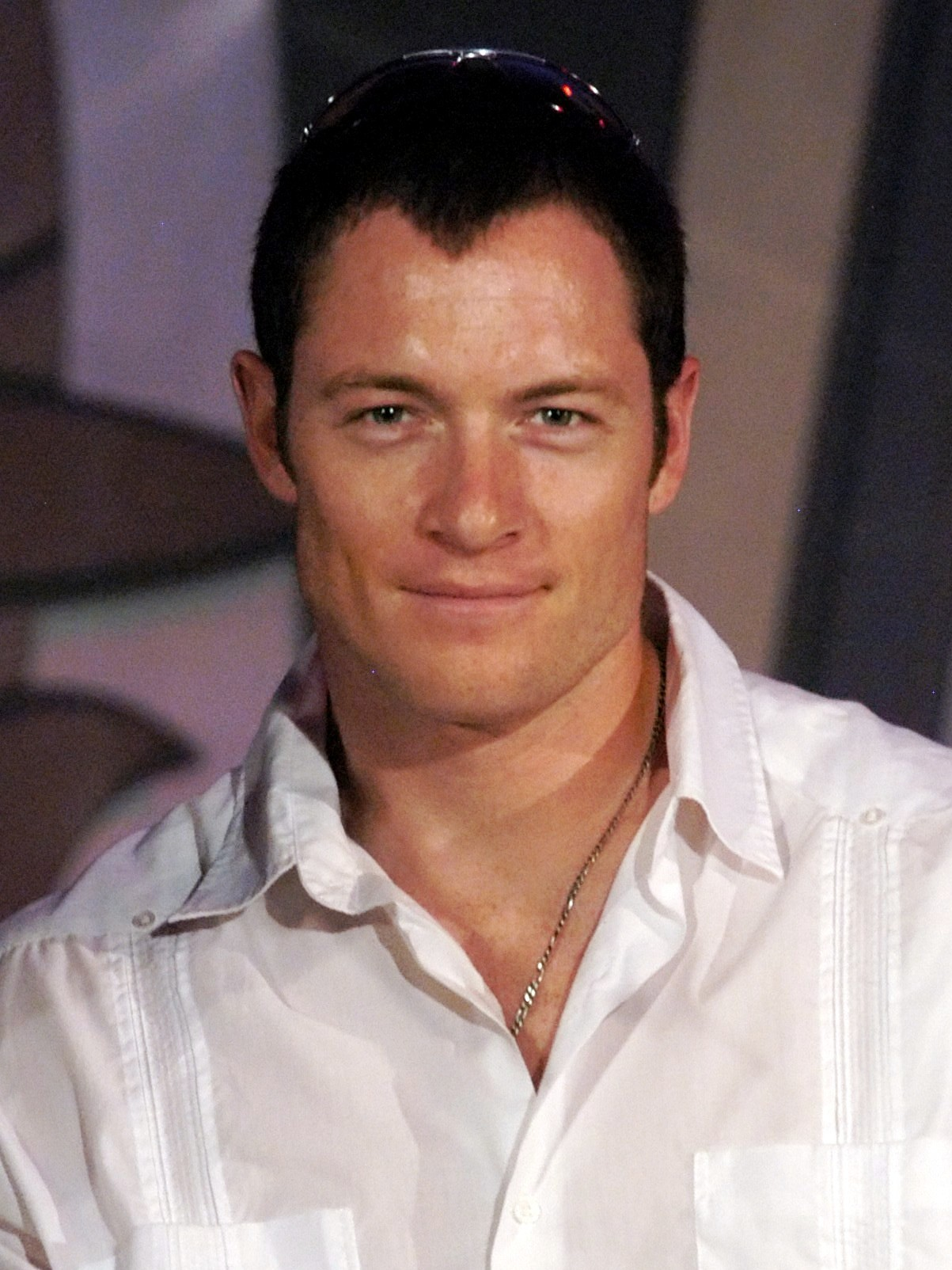
Penikett in 2006

Among his early acting work were stints on assorted Canadian TV series such as Cold Squad. He also appeared on the TV show Smallville -- in the Season 3 episode "Resurrection" as Vince Davis and in the Season 6 episodes, "Nemesis" and "Prototype", as Sgt. Wes Keenan. He portrayed a police officer for a predominantly gay neighbourhood in the 2004 The L Word episode "Losing It", which also starred Battlestar Galactica co-star Nicki Clyne in a related storyline.

In 2003, the 1978 science fiction television series Battlestar Galactica was "reimagined" as a three-hour miniseries on the SciFi Channel. The production was filmed in Vancouver, British Columbia, Canada, and Penikett, a local actor, auditioned and was cast in the part of Karl "Helo" Agathon, an officer in the Colonial Fleet. The miniseries proved highly successful, and a full Battlestar Galactica series was commissioned. The role was not based on a character in the original show and was meant to be confined to the miniseries only. However, both the producers and test audiences were sufficiently impressed with the character, and Penikett's performance, that the decision was made to make Helo recur on the show.

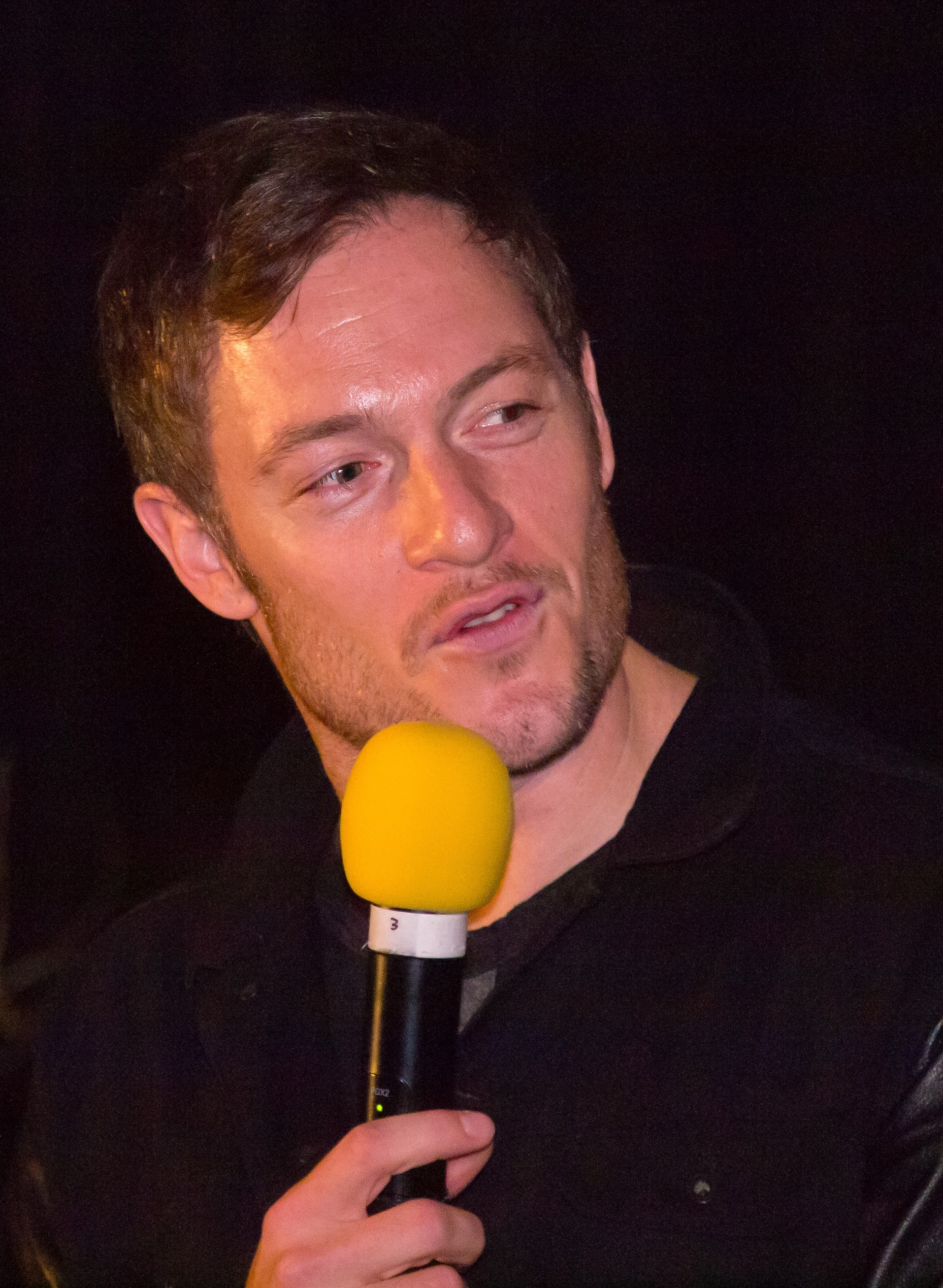
Penikett in 2014

In 2009, Penikett was cast as Paul Ballard in Joss Whedon's science-fiction drama television series Dollhouse, which aired on the Fox network Friday nights at 9:00.

Dollhouse was canceled at the end of its second season, and the series finale aired on Friday, January 29, 2010. In 2012, Penikett guest-starred as a politician named Jim Martin in the first season of Showcase's Continuum. He returned as a recurring character for the show's second season. In 2013, Penikett was cast in the CW TV series Supernatural, appearing in the ninth season premiere as a fallen angel who claims to be Ezekiel. The character's actual name was revealed as Gadreel in episode nine, and Penikett reprised the role in episodes 10, 18, 21, and 22. He also landed a recurring role on the mid-season drama Star-Crossed, which premiered in February 2014.

In 2014, Penikett guest-starred in the 200th episode of Criminal Minds as Michael Hastings, an ex-CIA agent and leader of the terrorist group, The Regime Squad. Since 2014, he has also starred in the award-winning web series Riftworld Chronicles.

In 2024, Penikett portrayed Ed Finley in the Lifetime film The Killer Inside: The Ruth Finley Story.

== Personal life ==
Penikett lives in Vancouver with his family.

== Charity work ==
In April 2008, in support of the Babz Chula Lifeline for Artists Society, which raised money for their (late) friend and fellow Canadian actor Chula's cancer treatment, Penikett and his Battlestar Galactica colleague Kandyse McClure auctioned off dinner with the two of them in Vancouver.

== Filmography ==
=== Film ===
Year	Title	Role	Notes
2002	Go-Go Boy (Prelude)	Aaron Fitz (Go-Go Boy)	Short film
2005	Sandra Goes to Whistler	Conrad	Short film
2006	Stanley's Girlfriend	Stanley	Short film
2006	Trapped Ashes	Young Leo	Segment: "Stanley's Girlfriend"
2007	The Green Chain	Brett Hall	
2007	Taming Tammy	Wilson	
2007	Trick 'r Treat	Henry	
2010	The Hostage	The Figure	Short film Also executive producer
2012	Big Time Movie	Agent A	
2013	Man of Steel	Jed Eubanks	
2013	Down River	Chris	
2014	The Portal	Alar	Short film
2015	Painkillers	Major John Cafferty	
2015	Justice League: Gods and Monsters	Steve Trevor	Voice, direct-to-video
2016	Pure Pwnage	Charles McBean	
2017	Deadly Secrets by The Lake	Santos Alvarez	
2021	The Last Victim	Richard	
2023	Jonah	Henrik	

=== Television ===
Year	Title	Role	Notes
1996	Murder on the Iditarod Trail	n/a	Television film
2002	Glory Days	Eric Forester	Episode: "No Guts, No Glory"
2002	Dark Angel	ND Cop	Episode: "Freak Nation"
2002	Wildfire 7: The Inferno	Sheriff	Television film
2002	Stargate SG-1	Third	Episode: "Unnatural Selection"
2003	Under the Cover	Jonas	Television film
2003	Just Cause	Principal Joe Decker	Episode: "Blackboard Jungle"
2003	Battlestar Galactica	Lt. Karl Agathon	Miniseries, 2 episodes
2004–2007	Smallville	Vince Davis/Wes Keenan	3 episodes
2004–09	Battlestar Galactica	Lt./Capt. Karl Agathon	Series regular (65 episodes)
2004	The L Word	Sheriff	Episode: "Losing It"
2004–2005	Cold Squad	Det. Ray Chase	Series regular; season 7 (13 episodes)
2006	Hush	Noah Hamilton	Television film
2006	Lesser Evil	Greg	Television film
2007	Robot Chicken	Armpit/Karl C. Agathon/Scott Trakker	Voice, episode: "Rabbits on a Roller Coaster"
2007	Whistler	Elias Noth	4 episodes
2009	Titan Maximum	Troy Hammerschmiddtt	Voice, 4 episodes
2009–2010	Dollhouse	Paul Ballard	Series regular (27 episodes)
2010	Riverworld	Matt Ellman	Television film
2010	Human Target	Pete	Episode: "Ilsa Pucci"
2011	Mortal Kombat: Legacy	Lt. Kurtis Stryker	Episode: "Jax, Sonya and Kano"
2011–2012	The Killing	Gregory "Greg" Casher (formerly Linden)	2 episodes
2011	Jabberwock	Francis	Television film
2011	Haven	Simon Crocker	Episode: "Sins of the Fathers"
2011	Innocent	Jimmy Brand	Television film
2012	Castle	Cole Maddox	2 episodes
2012–2013	Continuum	Jim Martin	5 episodes
2012	Fairly Legal	Mark Ellison	Episode: "Bait & Switch"
2012	Arrow	Nick Salvati	Episode: "Muse of Fire"
2013	Bomb Girls	Clifford	5 episodes
2013–2014	Supernatural	Gadreel	6 episodes
2014	Star-Crossed	SEU Officer Jack Beaumont	2 episodes
2014	Criminal Minds	Michael Hastings	Episode: "200"
2014	Reign	John Prevo	Episode: Higher Ground
2014	Strange Empire	Marshall Mercredi	Recurring role (8 episodes)
2015	Justice League: Gods and Monsters Chronicles	Steve Trevor	Voice, episode: "Big"
2015	Angel of Christmas	Derek	Television film
2015	Riftworld Chronicles	Alar	Web series
2016	Real Detective "Malice"	Detective C.W. Jensen	TV series (1 episode)
2016	Con Man	Randy Lane	Web series Episode: "A Small Step for Manly"
2017	Incorporated	Goran	TV series
2018	Altered Carbon	Dimitri Kadmin	2 episodes
2019	BH90210	Jack Carlisle	2 episodes
2021	Hudson & Rex	Leon Barrett	Episode: "Rex Marks the Spot"
2022	Devil in Ohio	Malachi Dodd	Netflix series
2022	Fire Country	Superintendent Paul Knox	Episode: "My Kinda Leader"
2024	The Killer Inside: The Ruth Finley Story	Ed Finley	Television film
2025	Tracker	FBI Agent Moss	Episode: "Rules of the Game"
2026	Carrie	Ralph White	Recurring role (6 episodes)

=== Video games ===
Year	Title	Role	Notes
2006	Need for Speed: Carbon	Darius	Voice and likeness
