= Gods of Riverworld =

1983 novel by Philip José Farmer

- Cover by Don Punchatz
- Author: Philip José Farmer
- Language: English
- Series: Riverworld
- Genre: Science fiction
- Publisher: Putnam Publishing Group
- Publication date: 1983
- Publication place: United States
- Media type: Print (Hardcover & Paperback)
- ISBN: 0-399-12843-3
- OCLC: 9533068
- Dewey Decimal: 813/.54 19
- LC Class: PS3556.A72 G6 1983
- Preceded by: The Magic Labyrinth

Gods of Riverworld (1983) is a science fiction novel by American writer Philip José Farmer, the fifth and last in the series of Riverworld books. It was reprinted in 1998 by Del Rey under the title The Gods of Riverworld.

== Plot ==
This book concludes the chronicles of the adventures of such diverse characters as Sir Richard Burton, Alice Pleasance Liddell, Aphra Behn and Tom Turpin through a bizarre afterlife in which every human ever to have lived is simultaneously resurrected along a single river valley that stretches over an entire planet.

Although Farmer's 1980 novel The Magic Labyrinth was originally intended to be the last in the series, Farmer continued it in this novel, which picks up with the characters who have just arrived in the alien-built tower at the headwaters of the river from which this constructed world gets its name; they must decide how to use the resurrection machinery they now control, and also solve the mystery of the murder of the mysterious stranger.

It is revealed that the Ethicals have been recording humanity since about 97,000 BC.

== See also ==
- Riverworld
