= Wyvern (film) =

- DVD cover
- Written by: Jason Bourque
- Directed by: Steven R. Monroe
- Starring: Nick Chinlund; Erin Karpluk; Barry Corbin
- Music by: Pinar Toprak
- Countries of origin: Canada; United States
- Original language: English

Production
- Executive producers: Lisa Hansen; Breanne Hartley; Paul Hertzberg; Lindsay McAdam; Peter von Gal
- Producer: Kirk Shaw
- Cinematography: C. Kim Miles
- Editor: Christopher A. Smith
- Running time: 89 minutes
- Production companies: CineTel Films; Insight Film Studio

Original release
- Network: Syfy
- Release: January 31, 2009

Wyvern, also known as Dragon, is a 2009 Canadian-American made-for-television horror film produced by RHI Entertainment that premiered in the United States on the Syfy Channel on January 31, 2009. Written by Jason Bourque and directed by Steven R. Monroe, Wyvern is the fifteenth film in the Maneater film series, produced under an agreement with Sci Fi Pictures. The film stars Nick Chinlund as Jake Suttner, a trucker who must stop a wyvern from eating the residents in the small town of Beaver Mills, Alaska. In Japan, it is titled Jurassic Predator.

== Plot ==
The Alaskan town of Beaver Mills, located north of the Arctic Circle, prepares for its annual celebration of the summer solstice, when the sun does not set. Meanwhile, a wyvern, a dragon-like beast, is released by the melting of the ice caps and attacks a fisherman on the shore of a lake nearby.

In town, ice trucker Jake Suttner acts as a handyman in a café. Jake had an accident with his truck nearby months prior, in which his brother died. Jake had minor injuries and is waiting in town for his insurance claim to be settled.

One morning, Sheriff Dawson and Jake hear gunshots. While investigating, they find a man named Haas, a victim of the wyvern. They do not believe him at first, but Jake sees a bloody arm lying nearby and identifies it as doctor David's. The three men return to town, and Dawson calls ahead to Claire, the cafe's owner, while they drive to ask her to have the townspeople gather, saying only that David is missing. He asks Deputy Susie to go out to the arm's location to investigate. After they arrive in town, they explain Doc is missing and things do not look good for him. While he is talking, Susie comes in, holding the arm, Dawson reprimands her, telling her to put it in the cooler at their office. Dawson advises them all to be careful, they obviously have a predator loose in the area, but then has to leave to investigate another incident.

While this happens, the Colonel, an older military man, has had a couple of odd things happen at home, like his dog disappearing and a moose's head being dropped into his hot tub. He sees the wyvern at home and again while going to town to warn the citizens; but they do not believe him. He asks Vinyl Hampton, who runs the town's radio station, to broadcast an emergency warning, but she refuses, saying that she cannot as she answers to a higher authority.

Dawson has told Deputy Susie to keep an eye on town, so she is there watching the goings on at the solstice festival. He gets to the location he was called to, finds the owner and animals dead in a barn, but slips on the blood as he turns to leave and hits his head, losing consciousness. In town, Vinyl sees the wyvern from her window, and tries to make an emergency broadcast, but is stopped when the creature rips out her antenna.

Sheriff Dawson comes to and calls Susie, wanting her to stop the festival and get everyone home. She starts making this announcement to the crowd using a megaphone. Meanwhile, the wyvern flies up behind her and kills her. Several others are killed, while some, like Haas, and Vinyl, take refuge in the café.

While all this is going on in town, Jake and Claire have tracked the wyvern to a mound in the forest, and afterwards run into the Colonel. The interstate which brings people in and out of town is full of cars, trucks, and RV's, crashed and attacked by the wyvern, intent on keeping the town secluded. They decide to return to Beaver Mills and do not see a badly wounded David on the far side of what is truly a nest, as he manages to look in and see three large, dark orange eggs. The wyvern then flies overhead and envelopes the doctor.

Back in Beaver Mills, Sheriff Dawson arrives and is killed by the wyvern. When Claire, Jake, and the Colonel arrive, and everyone takes stock, some go elsewhere in town to get supplies, and while returning to the café, a man named Farley is scraped across his chest with the beast's tail and is helped into the building.

The wyvern drops David in the middle of town as bait to draw people out of the café. David screams for help, bloody and in pain. Jake goes to rescue him while Farley distracts the wyvern, but get killed. David mentions that the wyvern has eggs, then dies. Claire, Jake, Haas, Vinyl, and the Colonel decide to electrify the nest with items that the beast has used to construct it and kill the wyvern. The creature kills Haas and escapes after it is shocked and flies off. The Colonel starts shooting the eggs, but Jake stops him, says that they could be bait.

The survivors drive away, but stop after seeing what looks like a brand new truck tractor on the side of the road, Jake's claim fulfilled. Jake comes up with a plan to kill the wyvern, saying that he needs Doc's GPS and the egg strapped into the truck. He drives off, alone, and as the GPS says that he is approaching ‘his destination’, the wyvern appears and attacks the vehicle. The truck reaches its destination, and Jake bails out as the tractor sails off a cliff, and explodes.

Everyone is waiting for Jake to appear at Claire's café, as the sky gets darker. He soon does, sauntering around a corner towards the restaurant, Claire hugs him. The others ask about his rig. Jake says that he does not need it, he likes it there, glancing at Claire.

== Cast ==
- Nick Chinlund as Jake Suttner
- Erin Karpluk as Claire
- Barry Corbin as Hass
- Tinsel Korey as Vinyl Hampton
- Simon Longmore as Farley
- John Shaw as Chief Dawson
- Elaine Miles as Deputy Susie Barnes
- Don S. Davis as Colonel Travis Sherman
- David Lewis as Dr. David Yates
- Karen Austin as Edna Grunyon
- Dave Ward as Fisherman
