= Erin Karpluk =

Canadian actress (born 1978/1979)

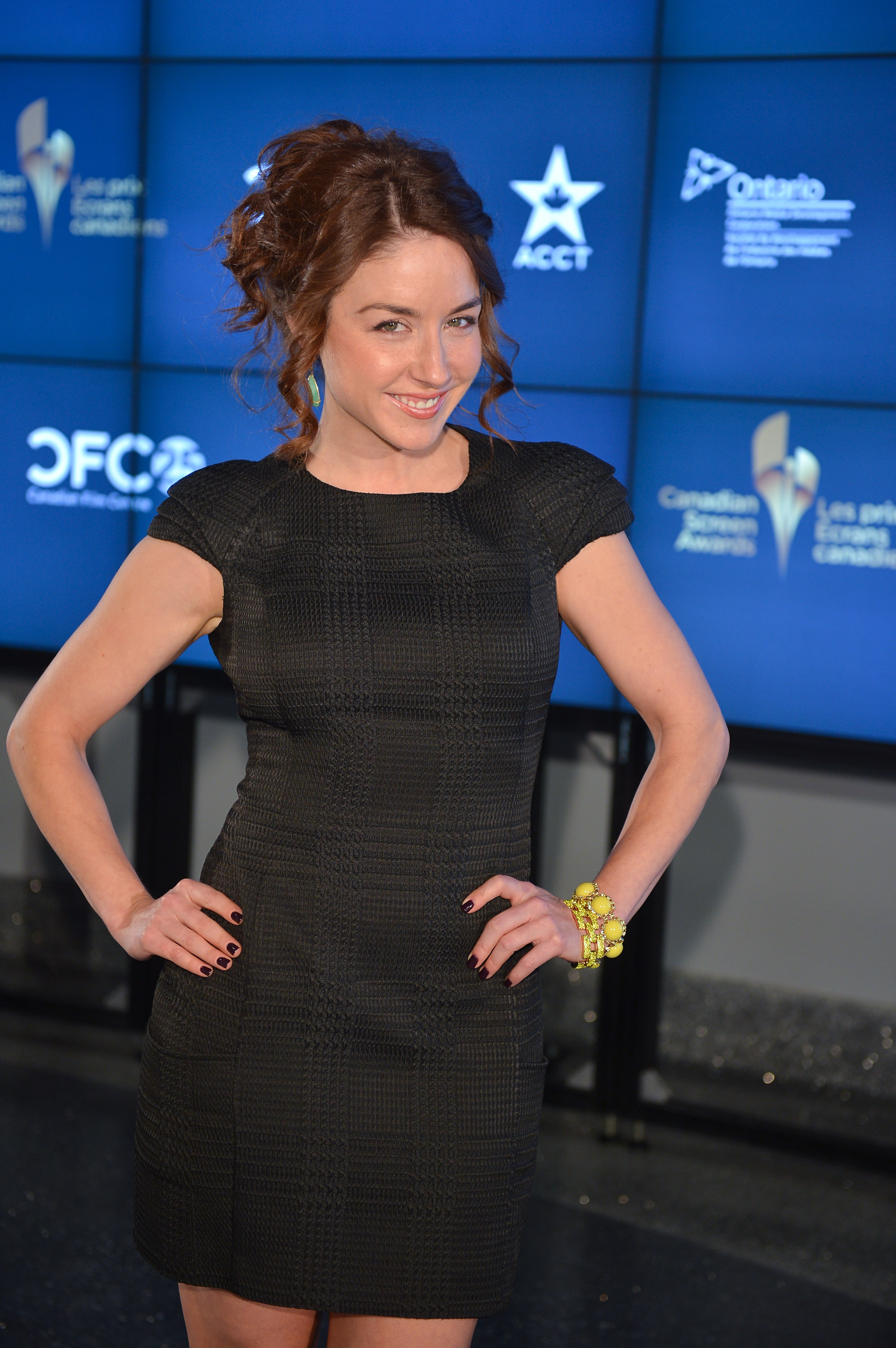
- Karpluk in 2013
- Born: 1978 or 1979 (age 47–48); Jasper, Alberta, Canada
- Occupation: Actress
- Years active: 2000–present

Erin Karpluk (born 1978 or 1979) is a Canadian actress. She is known for her portrayal of Erica Strange on the CBC Television series Being Erica from 2009 to 2011.

== Early life ==
Karpluk was born in Jasper, Alberta, to a mother who was a high-school principal and a father who was a railway engineer. She is of Ukrainian descent. She majored in theatre at the University of Victoria and received a Bachelor of Fine Arts degree in 2000.

== Career ==
Karpluk began her acting career in Vancouver. Between 2000 and 2005, she appeared in more than a dozen television movies and series before landing the role of Kate in Godiva's. Her work during this period included "Voice of Sylan" in the final episode of Dark Angel and the TV movie Family Sins. She was also in a short-lived US television series called Glory Days in 2002.

In 2004, she appeared in Legend of Earthsea and played a serial killer in Ripper 2: Letter from Within. She earned a Leo nomination for her first season of Godiva's and a 2006 Gemini nomination for Best Performance by an Actress in a Continuing Leading Dramatic Role.

After Godiva's, Karpluk continued to work in television and short films. In 2007, she appeared in Bionic Woman, Flash Gordon, and The L Word. She had a leading role in a 2008 television movie, Smokejumpers, directed by John Terlesky.

Karpluk was offered the lead role of Erica Strange in the CBC Television series Being Erica when she was working in Los Angeles on The L Word. In 2009, Karpluk won the Gemini award for Best Performance by an Actress in a Continuing Leading Dramatic Role for her portrayal of the titular character.

She also had a recurring role as Alice the radio station manager during the first season of the CW's Life Unexpected. Her only appearance during the second season was in the series finale because of the scheduling conflict that resulted when Being Erica was picked up for a third year. Karpluk has also had recurring roles on Rookie Blue and Slasher, and starred in the web series Riftworld.

In 2017, she had a supporting role on the Hallmark Movies & Mysteries series Fixer Upper Mysteries.

== Filmography ==
=== Film ===
Year	Title	Role	Notes
2004	I Want to Marry Ryan Banks	Nikki	
2004	Ripper 2: Letter from Within	Molly Keller	
2006	Almost Heaven	Catherine	
2006	Love and Other Dilemmas	Lucy Ladro	
2011	Rise of the Damned	Mandy	
2013	Assault on Wall Street	Rosie Baxford	
2014	The Portal	Kim	Short film
2014	Reasonable Doubt	Rachel Brockden	
2017	Concrete Evidence: A Fixer Upper Mystery	Jennifer Hennessey	
2017	Framed for Murder: A Fixer Upper Mystery	Jennifer Hennessey	
2017	A Swingers Weekend	Lisa	
2018	Deadly Deed: A Fixer Upper Mystery	Jennifer Hennessey	

=== Television ===
Year	Title	Role	Notes
2000	Seven Days	LaSalle's wife	Episode: "The Devil and the Deep Blue Sea"
2002	Carrie	Madeline	Television film
2002	Dark Angel	Gem / X-5	Episode: "Freak Nation"
2002	Glory Days	Cal Henries	Recurring role
2002	Jeremiah	Sadie	Episode: "The Bag"
2002	Taken	Sarah	Episode: "Acid Tests"
2003	The Dead Zone	Maddy Powers	Episode: "Misbegotten"
2003	Maximum Surge	Zoey	Television film
2004	Earthsea	Diana	Miniseries
2004	Eve's Christmas	Mandy	Television film
2004	Family Sins	Carol Geck	Television film
2004	It Must Be Love	Tess Gazelle	Television film
2004	The Reality of Love	Nikki	Television film
2004	10.5	Rachel	Miniseries
2005	Killer Instinct	Robin	Episode: "Pilot"
2005–2006	Godiva's	Kate	Main role
2006	Men in Trees	Amanda	Episode: "New York Fiction: Part 1"
2006	Supernatural	Monica	Episode: "Salvation"
2007	Bionic Woman	Robin	Episodes: "Paradise Lost", "The Education of Jaime Sommers"
2007	Flash Gordon	Dr. Debra Peterson	Episode: "The Sorrow"
2007	Judicial Indiscretion	Jennifer	Television film
2007	Luna: Spirit of the Whale	Jill Mackay	Television film
2007	Snowglobe	Claire	Television film
2007	Termination Point	Allison Curran	Television film
2008	The Guard	Robyn	Episodes: "Zero Footprint", "Sounds of Loneliness"
2008	The L Word	Susan / Alysse	Episodes: "Lookin' at You, Kid", "Lunar Cycle", "Loyal and True"
2008	Trial by Fire	Chelsea	Television film
2009	Mrs. Miracle	Reba Maxwell	Television film
2009	Revolution	Connie	Television film
2009	Wyvern	Claire	Television film
2009–2011	Being Erica	Erica Strange	Main role
2010–2011	Life Unexpected	Alice	Recurring role
2011	Captain Starship	Candace	
2011	Christmas Lodge	Mary Tobin	Television film
2011	Flashpoint	Ava Logan	Episode: "Thicker Than Blood"
2012–2013	Delete	Jesse White	Episodes: "1.1", "1.2"
2013	Jack	Alison	Television film
2013	Layla & Jen	Jen	
2013	The Listener	Dr. Laura Gray	Episode: "Fatal Vision"
2013	Out of Reach	Lynn Conner	Television film
2013	Republic of Doyle	Dr. Wedgewood	Episode: "Blood Work"
2013	Saving Hope	Sonja Sullivan	Episodes: "I Watch Death", "Defense", "All Things Must Pass", "Vamonos", "Wide Awake"
2013	Suddenly	Ellen	Television film
2013	Supernatural	Robin	Episode: "Bad Boys"
2014	Killer Women	Sue Ellen Tucker	Episode: "Daughter of the Alamo"
2014–2015	Rookie Blue	Juliet	Recurring role
2015	Riftworld Chronicles	Kim	Web series
2016	Masters of Sex	Darleen Connolly	Recurring role
2016	Slasher	Heather Peterson	Recurring role
2017	Criminal Minds: Beyond Borders	Diane Curry	Episode: "Made in"
2018	The Black Widow Killer	Judy Dwyer	Television film
2018	Christmas Cupcakes	Kim Remo	Television film
2018–2022	Holly Hobbie	Katherine Hobbie	Main role
2019	All My Husband's Wives	Alison	Television film
2019	The Magical Christmas Shoes	Kayla Hummell	Television film
2019	New Year's Kiss	Kelly	Television film
2019	9-1-1	Pepper	Episode: "Christmas Spirit"
2019	Slasher: Solstice	Kaili Greenberg	Main role
2020	9-1-1: Lone Star	Pepper	Episode: "Bum Steer"
2021	Debris	Mariel Caldwell	Episodes: "Asalah", "A Message from Ground Control"
2021	Maid	Sharlene	Episodes: "Bear Hunt", "Thief"; miniseries
2021	A Million Little Things	Anna Benoit	Episode: "The Talk", "Trust Me", "Game Night", "Crystal Clear", "Stay", "The Things We Keep Inside"
2023	Upload	Magruder	Episode: "S3E6 - Memory Crackers"
2024	Three Wise Men and a Boy	Caroline	Television film
2024	Resident Alien	Dr. Wendy Beasley	Episode: "Avian Flu"
2025	Three Wisest Men	Caroline	Television film
2026	My Life with the Walter Boys	Hannah	Recurring role

== Awards ==
Year	Award	Category	Work nominated	Result	Ref.
2005	Leo Awards	Dramatic Series: Best Lead Performance by a Female	Godiva's	Nominated	
2006	Gemini Awards	Best Performance by an Actress in a Continuing Leading Dramatic Role	Godiva's	Nominated	
2006	Leo Awards	Best Lead Performance by a Female in a Dramatic Series	Godiva's	Nominated	
2007	Leo Awards	Best Supporting Performance by a Female in a Feature Length Drama	Love and Other Dilemmas	Nominated	
2008	Leo Awards	Best Guest Performance by a Female in a Dramatic Series	Flash Gordon	Nominated	
2008	Leo Awards	Best Supporting Performance by a Female in a Feature Length Drama	Luna: Spirit of the Whale	Nominated	
2009	Gemini Awards	Best Performance by an Actress in a Continuing Leading Dramatic Role	Being Erica	Won	
2010	Leo Awards	Best Lead Performance by a Female in a Dramatic Series	Being Erica	Won	
2011	Gemini Awards	Best Performance by an Actress in a Continuing Leading Dramatic Role	Being Erica	Nominated	
2011	Leo Awards	Best Lead Performance by a Female in a Dramatic Series	Being Erica	Nominated	
2012	Leo Awards	Best Lead Performance by a Female in a Dramatic Series	Being Erica	Nominated	
2014	Leo Awards	Best Lead Performance by a Female in a Television Movie	Delete	Nominated	
2016	Golden Maple Awards	Best actress in a TV series broadcast in the U.S.	The Riftworld Chronicles	Nominated	
