= The Dark Design =

1977 novel by Philip José Farmer

- First edition
- Author: Philip José Farmer
- Cover artist: Vincent Di Fate
- Language: English
- Series: Riverworld
- Genre: Science fiction
- Publisher: Berkley Books
- Publication date: 1977
- Publication place: United States
- Media type: Print (hardback & paperback)
- ISBN: 0-399-12031-9
- OCLC: 2910978
- Dewey Decimal: 813/.5/4
- LC Class: PZ4.F234 Dar3 PS3556.A72
- Preceded by: The Fabulous Riverboat
- Followed by: The Magic Labyrinth

The Dark Design (1977) is a science fiction novel by American writer Philip José Farmer (1918-2009), the third in his series of Riverworld books. The title is derived from lines in Sir Richard Francis Burton's poem The Kasîdah of Hâjî Abdû El-Yezdî:

And still the Weaver plies his loom, whose warp and woof is wretched Man
Weaving th' unpattern'd dark design, so dark we doubt it owns a plan.

The Dark Design was the author's first bestseller.

== Plot summary ==
The plot, set 30 years after humanity's resurrection, consists of three distinct plot lines, which come together towards the conclusion.

In the first plot line, Richard Burton and his friends continue their journey up river. On their journey, they encounter a group of ancient Egyptians who tell them of a mission which their Pharaoh had undertaken to reach the source of the River. Accompanied by the Titanthrop Joe Miller, who they believed to be an avatar of Thoth, they scaled the mountains at the River's headwaters and descended into a polar sea, with a large black tower in the center. On the shores, they found a cave with supplies and boat. One of their number died there, bringing the story back to the Valley. Burton also discovers that his group has been infiltrated by traitors. Through hypnosis, the Neanderthal Kaz identifies Monat and Pete Frigate as agents of the alien creators of the Riverworld. When Burton goes to confront them, he discovers that they have disappeared.

The second plot line deals with the real Peter Jairus Frigate, who is unaware that someone has been impersonating him (actually his deceased brother who died in infancy). One day, a ship docks near his home and Frigate recognizes its captains as two of his childhood heroes, Tom Mix and Jack London. He signs on to the crew, joining the Sufi mystic Nur-ed-Din and the African warrior Umslopogas. For years he travels with them without revealing that he knows Mix and London's identities. When he finally confronts the men, they reveal that they had been recruited by the Mysterious Stranger to find the source of the River. They eventually stumble upon the metal rich nation of New Bohemia and Frigate suggests they build a balloon to reach the pole faster. However, soon after launch, their balloon is destroyed during an encounter with another airship.

In the third plot line, the nation of Parolando, now under the rule of President Milton Firebrass, is building an airship, which will allow them to reach the pole faster than Clemens' steamboat. Cyrano de Bergerac has opted to stay behind to help with the project and proves to be a competent pilot. Training is overseen by new arrival Jill Gulbirra, an Australian dirigible pilot and strident feminist. The airship launches and rapidly makes the journey to the pole, where they discover the sea and the dark tower described by the Egyptians. Firebrass and several others abruptly board a helicopter to fly down to the tower, but it explodes, killing them. Engineer Barry Thorn is jailed after it is discovered that he planted a bomb on the helicopter. The crew find a doorway on the roof of the tower, but all attempts to enter it are stymied by an invisible force field. Japanese Sufi Piscator is able to make it further than anyone and disappears into the tower. After he does not return, Jill Gulbirra decides to cut their losses and head home. On the way back, they are persuaded by Clemens to mount an attack on King John's steamship. Cyrano leads the attack, which nearly succeeds in kidnapping John, but the king escapes. In the confusion, Barry Thorn escapes and parachutes from the airship, which explodes behind him.

- During the third plot line, it is revealed that Firebrass knew the alien from Arcturus and the death of most of humanity in the year 2003 AD.

== See also ==
- Riverworld
