= GURPS Riverworld =

- GURPS Riverworld cover
- Designers: J. M. Caparula
- Publishers: Steve Jackson Games
- Publication: 1989
- Systems: GURPS

GURPS Riverworld is a sourcebook for the GURPS role-playing game.

== Contents ==
GURPS Riverworld is a GURPS supplement and campaign setting that describes Riverworld, a planet where every person in human history is reincarnated along the banks of an incredibly long river, as drawn from the novels of Philip José Farmer. The book describes the technology of the River Valley, the famous characters who inhabit it, their aircraft and riverboats, and the alien Ethicals who created the place. The book includes rules for mass combat and guidelines for running a campaign, plus an introductory scenario, "Resurrection Day."

GURPS Riverworld describes, as a setting in which gamemasters and players can set their adventures, the fictional world described in the novels of the Riverworld series by Philip José Farmer. This setting is an artificial planet where everyone who lived before a set date in history seems to have been resurrected.

== Publication history ==
GURPS Riverworld was written by J.M. Caparula with Steve Jackson and Creede Lambard, with a cover by Alan Gutierrez and illustrations by Larry MacDougall, and was published by Steve Jackson Games in 1989 as a 128-page book.

== Reception ==
In the January 1990 edition of Games International (Issue 12), Ian Marsh thought that Riverworld was a good place to set a role-playing adventure, but pointed out that it would work best with people who had not read Riverworld, saying, "it would spoil the novelty of adventuring there if players who were new to it knew anything about the background." Although Marsh thought that the GURPS system was a good one for the Riverworld setting, he complained that the GURPS system didn't make the special character "heroic enough." He also found the organization of the book wanting, pointing out that even with an index, "there is still too much page-flipping to find information." He also had issue with the copy-editing, finding a large number of errors in the text. However, he concluded by giving the game an above average rating of 4 stars out of 5, although he warned players that "Riverworld's appeal is limited."

In the April 1990 edition of Dragon (Issue #156), Ken Rolston was generally impressed, saying, "For old-time fans of the Riverworld novels, this is a fun read just for the overview of the Riverworld setting, the motivations of its creators, and the mechanics of its maintenance. But much to my surprise, I found it an interesting and plausible setting for role-playing adventure, and the GURPS game is the perfect system to support it. The access to PC and NPC personalities and cultures from all the historical periods of Earth, the problem-solving challenges of adapting and improvising in the lower technological level of Riverworld society, the opportunities for empire-building in the style of Clemens and King John, and the epic upriver quest to the Tower of the Ethicals - there's some great stuff here for a role-playing campaign."
