= Riverworld =

Science fiction setting by Philip José Farmer

- First appearance: "The Day of the Great Shout" (1965 novelette)
- Last appearance: "Coda" (1993 short story)
- Created by: Philip José Farmer
- Genre: Planetary romance, Pocket universe, Philosophical fiction

In-universe information
- Type: Fictional planet

The Riverworld series consists of five science fiction novels (1971–1983) by American author Philip José Farmer (1918–2009). The Riverworld is an artificial, or heavily terraformed, planet where all humans (and pre-humans) who ever lived throughout history have been resurrected. The novels (and a few shorter works) explore interactions of resurrected individuals from many different cultures and time periods. The underlying theme is quasi-religious. The motivations and ethics of the unknown intelligences that created the Riverworld and its inhabitants are explored.

The series' cast of characters includes (among others) Cyrano de Bergerac, Richard Francis Burton, Hermann Göring, John, King of England, Alice Liddell, Jack London, Tom Mix, Wolfgang Amadeus Mozart, Odysseus, and Mark Twain.

== Works ==
=== Original, unpublished manuscript ===
Riverworld began when Farmer wrote a 150,000-word novel, calling it Owe for the Flesh, over six weeks in the fall of 1952 and submitted it at the last minute to the Shasta Science-Fiction Novel Prize Contest. He won the contest, with assurances of publication, but circumstances conspired to ensure that that would not happen for many years. The complete manuscript, now believed lost, consisted of four "books":

- Owe for the Flesh
  - "The Great Cry"
  - "A State of Honesty"
  - "The River of Eternity"
  - "The Paddle Wheeled Comet"

In about 1981, and in the wake of the success of the Riverworld novels, Farmer issued a general request to anyone who might have the original manuscript. An 80,000-word document entitled "River of Eternity" was then discovered in a garage and returned to Farmer. This turned out to be, not the original, but a version produced in the mid-1950s by Farmer (who had entirely forgotten about it) from the third "book" at the request of the publisher Melvin Korshak. This document was published unaltered in 1983 by Phantasia Press as River of Eternity and is generally considered to be of mostly academic interest.

=== Magazine publications ===
With no prospect of imminent publication, Farmer moved on to other projects. But in 1963 and '64, he rewrote the material into a second version and in late 1964 into a third, which he now called Owe for a River. This version was submitted to Ballantine Books, but it was rejected as being too much of an adventure story without sufficient deeper philosophical implications. Undaunted, he sent the manuscript to Frederik Pohl who at that time edited a number of prominent science fiction magazines. Pohl suggested that Farmer break the novel into several novelettes for serial publication in his periodicals. Farmer agreed, and thus the fourth version of what started out as Owe for the Flesh 13 years before finally saw publication as five novelettes:

- "The Day of the Great Shout" (Worlds of Tomorrow, January 1965)
- "Riverworld" (Worlds of Tomorrow, January 1966)
- "The Suicide Express" (Worlds of Tomorrow, March 1966)
- "The Felled Star" (Worlds of If, July 1967, August 1967)
- "The Fabulous Riverboat" (Worlds of If, June 1971, August 1971)

Of these five novelettes, four—all but "Riverworld"—were expanded and combined into the first two Riverworld novels as published by Putnam Publishing Group in 1971. Thus the fifth, and final, version of the Riverworld sequence comprises the four "mainstream" (Farmer's term) novels (1971-80) listed below, plus the extra "sidestream" book, Gods of Riverworld (1983).

As to the novelette that remained a "standalone"—"Riverworld"—it underwent a slight expansion and was included in Farmer's collection Down in the Black Gang in 1971. After one more (final) expansion and polishing, it was included in the collection Riverworld and Other Stories in 1979.

=== Published novels (and short stories) ===
The five novels in the Riverworld series are as follows:

- To Your Scattered Bodies Go (1971)—Hugo Award winner, Locus Award nominee
- The Fabulous Riverboat (1971)
- The Dark Design (1977)
- The Magic Labyrinth (1980)
- Gods of Riverworld (1983; later published as The Gods of Riverworld)

In the early 1990s, it was decided to turn Riverworld into a shared universe anthology series, with numerous authors being invited to participate. Two volumes were released:

- Tales of Riverworld (1992) (includes one story written by Farmer: "Crossing the Dark River". A second story, "A Hole In Hell", was written by Farmer under the pseudonym Dane Helstrom)
- Quest to Riverworld (1993) (includes two stories written by Farmer: "Up the Bright River" and "Coda")

== Story ==
=== Setting ===
On the Riverworld, every human who ever lived and died—from the earliest Neanderthals up to 1983—is resurrected on the banks of a seemingly endless river on an unknown planet. Along the river's almost 18 million twisting and turning miles, some 36.6 billion humans are miraculously provided with food, but with no clue to the possible meaning or purpose of this strange afterlife.

Some people set sail upon the great river to quest for the meaning of their resurrection, and to find and confront their mysterious "benefactors". Among the denizens of the Riverworld, we meet Sir Richard Francis Burton, Mark Twain, Odysseus, Cyrano de Bergerac, Hermann Göring, Tom Mix, and many others, including a modest alter ego of the author himself. Some characters collaborate and some embark upon solo journeys of their own in this landscape.

=== Overview ===
Starting in the "late twenty second century", the Riverworld has been engineered by an alien race to consist solely of a single long river-valley which snakes across its entire surface. The river's source is a small North Polar sea, from which it follows a course tightly zig-zagging across one hemisphere before flowing into another, along an equally labyrinthine path, to the same sea. The river has an average depth of 1.5 miles (2.4 km), and its width ranges from 6.8 miles (10.9 km) to 24.8 miles (39.9 km). It is shallow near the shore but plunges to enormous depths towards the channel. The banks are generally smooth and gentle, expanding into wide plains on either side, then assuming jagged hills before an impenetrable mountain range. The valley averages 9 miles (14 km) in width, but includes narrows and occasional widenings into lakes with islands. From source to mouth, the original supposition of the river's length is 20,000,000 miles, as said by Alice Hargreaves and attributed to Peter Frigate, shortly after the defeat of Hermann Goering. (Books I, II, and III later state the river is 10,000,000 miles (16,000,000 km) long). There are no seasons, and daily variations are metronomic. The only animal life consists of fish and soil worms. The vegetation is lush and of great variety, including trees, flowering vines, several kinds of fast-growing bamboo, and a resilient mat of grass which covers the plains. The Riverworld has no visible moon, but a great number of stellar objects in the sky, including gas sheets and stars close enough to show a visible disk.

The story of Riverworld begins when 36,006,009,637 humans, varying from the first Homo sapiens until the early 21st century, are simultaneously resurrected along the river. Of these, 20% are from the 20th century, due to the high population thereof. Originally the cutoff year was given as 2008 in To Your Scattered Bodies Go, but this later was modified to 1983 in The Dark Design. Purportedly, the cut-off indicated the point at which most of the human race had been purposefully annihilated by first contact with aliens visiting Earth. The protagonists later find this a creative fiction, produced by the masterminds of the resurrection. Undercover agents of these masters placed on the Riverworld would identify themselves as having died after 1983 so as to be recognized by fellow agents.

In each area are initially three groups of people: a large group from one time period and place, a smaller group from another time and place, and a very small group of people from random times and places (most of the 20th- and 21st-century humans are part of this last group).

=== Resurrectees ===
Most of the resurrected awaken in a body equivalent to that of their 25-year-old selves, in perfect health and free of any previous genetic or acquired defects. All heart disease, tooth decay, and blindness are gone, all amputated limbs are restored, and all scars, tattoos and other body modifications are removed; whereas certain neurological impulses (for instance, curiosity or chemical addiction) remain intact. These bodies do not age, and can regenerate nearly any non-fatal injury, including dismemberments and blindings. The new bodies are completely free of infection and seem resistant to it (albeit in the absence of hostile bacteria or viruses on the Riverworld). Initially hairless, the bodies grow cephalic hair and pubic hair at a normal rate. Men do not have foreskins or grow facial hair; whereas women have intact hymens. It is impossible to conceive children on the Riverworld; all food provided by grails (see below) contain contraceptive substances, and there is no wathan generator on the Riverworld so any babies born there would lack sapience (see below).

Anyone who died at an age younger than 25 assumes a body equivalent to that lesser age, which then ages at a normal rate before stopping at 25. Should an individual die, they are resurrected elsewhere along the banks of the river at random. Some people even use this process to travel, though there is a limit to the number of resurrections available to each person; one of the main protagonists is warned by the creators of the Riverworld that after 777 deliberate suicides he is in danger of failing to resurrect after his next death. No one who was less than five years old at death is resurrected on the Riverworld, nor are people deemed to be incurably insane (it is eventually revealed that these people were resurrected on another planet, Gardenworld). No hominids born before the approximate year 97,000 BCE were saved for the Riverworld project and thus were never resurrected anywhere.

One of the themes of the series is the way historical characters change as a result of this cosmopolitan setting. For example, one of the characters depicted in the first book of the Riverworld series, To Your Scattered Bodies Go, is a tormented, drug-addicted Hermann Göring who ends up as a missionary of the Church of the Second Chance, a peaceful religion. Apparently left to their own devices, the people re-create their Earthly societies.

==== Language ====
Because all human languages are initially in use on the Riverworld, the Ethicals are not able to explain clearly to the resurrected Humans what's happening. In order to explain without misunderstanding, they must first spread a common language. They choose Esperanto to be the common language and create a religion called the Church of the Second Chance to spread it via traveling priests.

==== Grails ====
The resurrected awaken with nearly-indestructible containers tied to their wrists, commonly called "grails", which produce food, drink, pieces of cloth, and luxury items, such as alcohol, tobacco, marijuana (and lighters for same), hair care utensils, makeup, and a hallucinogenic chewing gum known as "dreamgum". To operate, grails must be placed onto large, mushroom-shaped "grailstones", found at intervals along the riverbanks, which produce an electrical discharge three times per day (corresponding to the times of breakfast, lunch and dinner). As agriculture is absent, and indeed impossible on the Riverworld, the grails are vital to an individual's survival, and cannot be opened except by their individual owners. Nevertheless, "grail slavery" is not uncommon, in which a person is held captive and the contents of his or her grail, retrieved by the owner, are taken by force by the captor. The slaver will usually provide the slave with enough food to keep him or her alive, as once a person dies their grail becomes useless.

Of special value are "free grails", originally found atop each of the grailstones as a demonstration of their relationship. Free grails can be opened by any individual, and as such, are valued for an extra ration of goods at each interval. Throughout the series, several main characters lose their original grails and thus must seek free grails to survive.

==== Natural resources and travel ====
Though the grails provide for all needs and the climate is hospitable, further attempts to affect the environment are frustrated by the near-complete lack of metals and ores on the planet. The only building materials available are bamboo, wood, and human or fish bones and hides. Pockets of flint (eventually depleted) provide material for tools. With technology limited to the Paleolithic level, the surrounding mountains prove impassable.

Travel along the river is hindered by division of the Riverworld into thousands of empires, monarchies, republics, and other social systems which evolve, each only a few kilometers long and housing 90 people per square kilometer. Because the distribution of populations along the river seems random, the character of these nations can vary wildly within a very short span; one may enter dangerously unknown and potentially hostile territory in less than a day's journey.

=== Purpose ===
The reason for the existence of Riverworld is initially a complete mystery. In Farmer's books a number of historical figures — including Sir Richard Burton, Alice Hargreaves, Samuel Clemens, Baron de Marbot, John, King of England, Cyrano de Bergerac, Tom Mix, Mozart, Jack London, Lothar von Richthofen, and Hermann Göring — interact with fictional characters to discover the Riverworld's purpose. Another character, Peter Jairus Frigate, bears a striking resemblance to Farmer himself, and shares his initials. There are two versions of the character: one who appears early in the sequence, the third overall character to be introduced, and another, the "real" version, who concludes that the first was his brother who died as a baby, resurrected and used as a spy by the creators of the Riverworld.

The story gradually reveals that the Riverworld was created as a moral test for humanity. In the Riverworld universe sapience is the result of an artificially created soul, known as a wathan, created by a generator developed and distributed among various worlds by an unknown ancient alien race. Wathan generators create wathans which attach themselves to sufficiently advanced chordates. Wathans are indestructible but become detached from the body upon physical death and wander the universe without purpose.

The first race to create wathans were adept tool users, but lacked individual sapience. Self-awareness increased their capabilities by an order of magnitude, and as the creators of wathan technology, they were able to "catch" wathans released by their own deaths, resurrecting themselves until individual resurrections became impossible. As this happened only to the wisest and most ethically advanced wathans, the people supposed a process of "passing on", comparable to the Indian religious concept of Moksha. With this in mind, they traveled the universe, placing wathan generators on worlds that could host wathans, thereby creating other sentient species. Once they created a species they determined they could trust, they tasked them with creating more sapient species after the whole of their own species had "passed on". This cycle occurred several times until the creation of humanity.

Humanity's creators are a race of aliens known, among their human allies, as "the Ethicals", who brought wathan technology to Earth, installing both a generator to produce wathans and a collector to catch and store wathans—and the human personas and memories accumulated by them—for later retrieval. The only Ethical seen in the stories is Monat Graatut, who poses as an ally and friend of Richard Francis Burton. The reason given for the collector was that humans were both extraordinarily civilized (capable of "passing on" within a single lifetime, as did Gautama Buddha), and extraordinarily barbaric (capable of genocide, slavery etc.), and therefore might or might not be trusted with wathan technology; an ambiguity meant for resolution by the Riverworld. Children who died before age five are resurrected on a "Gardenworld": a physical paradise where the children were raised as Ethicals, who later created the Riverworld in hope of stimulating moral contemplation. The repetitive physical environment was to encourage a concern with inward rather than outward circumstances, while the poverty of natural resources was to prevent the development of a higher technology, and the food provided by the grails, the presence of abundant water and potential shelter, and the resurrections were to obviate economy. Alcohol, marijuana, and the LSD-like dreamgum were provided for recreational purposes and to assist contemplation.

=== Academic study ===
Three books of the Riverworld series are analyzed in Mary Turzillo's book Reader's Guide to Philip José Farmer.

Antoine Ruiz of the Université d'Avignon (France) wrote a master's degree memoir entitled Redemption in Philip José Farmer's Riverworld in 1995.

== Elaborations and adaptations ==
=== Role playing game (1989) ===
A licensed guidebook outlining the setting for use in the GURPS role-playing game, GURPS Riverworld was released in 1989 by Steve Jackson Games. Copies of this guidebook were provided to the authors of the stories published in Tales of Riverworld and Quest to Riverworld, as this book summarizes the chronology, characters, geography and technical details of the Riverworld universe.

=== "Shared Universe" stories (1992 and later) ===
Since the publication of the original books, several authors have been licensed to use the Riverworld setting for their own stories—see "Works" towards the top of this page.

=== Video game (1998) ===
A PC computer game version of Riverworld was released in October 1998 by Cryo Interactive.

=== Television series (2003) ===
A television series loosely based on the Riverworld saga went into production for the Sci-Fi channel in 2001 but only the feature-length pilot episode Riverworld was completed. It was first aired in 2003. It used elements from To Your Scattered Bodies Go and The Fabulous Riverboat, though it replaced the books' hero, Sir Richard Francis Burton, with an American astronaut, and John, King of England with Nero as the villain. At one point, the pilot was available online through the Joost software worldwide except in the United States and Canada. It can be found on the Alliance Atlantis Sci-Fi channel.

=== Television movie (2010) ===
In 2010, a three-hour TV film, Riverworld, was produced and released by Syfy (formerly The Sci-fi Channel) in the US and by Studio Universal elsewhere, written by Robert Hewitt Wolfe. The protagonist is Matt Ellman, an American war reporter, played by Tahmoh Penikett. The main villain is Richard Francis Burton, who ironically was one of the prime heroes in the novels.

=== Fan fiction ===
Some stories written by fans and taking place in the Riverworld universe have been published through the official Philip José Farmer website.
