= Riverworld (2003 film) =

- DVD cover
- Genre: Science fiction
- Directed by: Kari Skogland
- Starring: Brad Johnson; Karen Holness; Emily Lloyd; Jeremy Birchall; Kevin Smith
- Country of origin: Canada
- Original language: English
- No. of episodes: 1

Production
- Running time: 86 minutes

Original release
- Network: Sci-Fi Channel
- Release: March 22, 2003

Related
- Riverworld (2010)

Riverworld is a sci-fi/fantasy television film. A pilot episode for a series that was never produced, it aired on the Sci-Fi Channel in 2003. It was loosely based on the Hugo Award-winning "Riverworld" saga by Philip José Farmer. Production began in 2001.

It was rebooted in 2010 under the same title.

== Plot ==
In the year 2009, a meteor shower above Earth claims the life of American astronaut Jeff Hale (Brad Johnson). He awakens inside a jade-green bubble beneath the surface of a body of water filled with other such bubbles. A mysterious cloaked figure pierces his bubble with a staff, pressing it against his forehead, forcefully filling Hale's mind with images to come. Dazed and in pain, Hale finds himself crawling nude onto a beach littered with metal canisters containing unisex clothing. Dozens of people from different lands and historical eras emerge nude from the water and distribute the canisters. All understand each other's language, except a lone Neanderthal man, who lacks the capacity for speech.

Hale learns that the "known world" is the bank of a massive river. Anyone who has ever lived on Earth at any time in history is qualified to start life anew on Riverworld, reborn in his or her prime of life. Other cloaked figures are seen fleetingly, but their purpose is unknown. Food is provided, and the climate is clement. The need for shelter is easily provided by available resources and simple manual labor.

Hale becomes close friends with some of his fellow castaways, all of them from different time periods: Alice Liddell Hargreaves (Emily Lloyd); Mali (Karen Holness), a former slave of the pre–Civil War era; and Lev Ruach (Jeremy Birchall), a Jewish victim of the Nazi Holocaust. Hale and Alice slowly fall in love, as do Mali and Lev. The Neanderthal among the castaways is later killed by a man introducing himself as Lucius Domitus Ahenobarbus (Jonathan Cake), a citizen of Ancient Rome. When Hale argues with Lucius about the latter's ethics, Lucius attacks him for leadership. However, their fight is interrupted by slavers under the rule of Valdemar (Kevin Smith), who has erected his own empire and plans to expand it.

While in captivity, Hale and the others meet two more prisoners: Monat (Brian Moore), an extraterrestrial who died—along with the rest of mankind—in a cataclysm in the year 2039; and a young girl named Gwenafra (Nikita Kearsley), the only human in Riverworld reborn as a child. During the night, Hale is freed by the hooded stranger he saw upon his reawakening in Riverworld. Hale hides from Valdemar's men and follows his fellow resurrectees to Valdemar's fortress. While freeing his friends, he witnesses Valdemar holding gladiatorial games, in which the despot is challenged and killed by Lucius, who identifies himself as Nero and subsequently takes over Valdemar's forces.

Monat leads his fellow captives to a community of fugitives led by Samuel Clemens (Cameron Daddo), who has built a riverboat christened the Go For Broke, augmented by Monat's technological expertise, to explore the river. Nero intends to use Sam's riverboat to extend his dominion downriver. With the aid of a traitor in Sam's ranks, he invades the fugitives' camp, imprisons Hale and his comrades, and forces Sam and Monat to show him how to operate it. Nero orders Hale left tied up in the river to drown and attempts to seduce Alice. After Gwenafra frees him, Hale and the others overcome Nero and his men, reclaiming the riverboat. Hale kills Nero in combat.

Following their liberation, the band travels upstream to explore the Riverworld. Sam gives command to Hale but remains the pilot. Nero is subsequently shown resurrected in a new body somewhere else underneath the river.

== Differences from the Riverworld books ==
A number of liberties are taken in the film with regard to the source material. The original hero and villain are replaced by other characters, the timeline of events is compressed (including the learning of languages which is eliminated entirely), and the nature of the resurrection process and food and clothing production are altered. Instead of a single meteor of iron, a "valley of meteors" with a constant stream of small falling objects provides the metals used by the characters. The Riverboat is powered by fusion rather than being recharged by Grailstones. The character Loghu is apparently replaced with another female warrior named Mali, and the alien Monat is radically different in appearance and behavior from that described in the books.

== Production ==
Riverworld was shot in New Zealand, at Studio West in West Auckland.
