= Riverworld (2010 miniseries) =

- Written by: Robert Hewitt Wolfe; Randall M. Badat
- Directed by: Stuart Gillard
- Starring: Tahmoh Penikett; Laura Vandervoort; Alan Cumming
- Theme music composer: Jim Guttridge
- Countries of origin: Canada; United States
- Original language: English

Production
- Producer: Michael O'Connor
- Cinematography: Thomas Burstyn
- Editor: James R. Symons
- Running time: 189 minutes
- Production company: Reunion Pictures

Original release
- Network: Syfy
- Release: April 18, 2010

Related
- Riverworld (2003)

Riverworld is a television film that had been intended to be a four-hour television miniseries released on the Syfy channel on April 18, 2010. Based on the Riverworld books by Philip José Farmer, this miniseries is a reboot of the cancelled Sci-Fi Channel Riverworld television series, of which only the pilot episode was produced.

Riverworld stars Tahmoh Penikett, Laura Vandervoort, Jeananne Goossen, Alan Cumming, Mark Deklin, and Peter Wingfield. It is produced by Reunion Pictures, a Canadian-based production company. It is written by Robert Hewitt Wolfe and directed by Stuart Gillard.

== Plot ==
The story centers on Matt Ellman, a war reporter, and his beloved Jessie, as they embark on a trip to Singapore, with Matt intending to propose marriage. Tragically, their lives are cut short in a devastating terrorist attack carried out by a suicide bomber.

Their journey, however, does not end with death. Instead, they awaken in an enigmatic realm called Riverworld, a vast and extraordinary planet where every soul that has ever lived on Earth has been reborn along the banks of an endless river. Riverworld serves as a sort of purgatory, offering its inhabitants a second chance at life.

In this world, Matt reunites with several of his deceased friends and encounters famous historical figures, some of whom become his allies, while others emerge as antagonists. Among the antagonists are the explorer Richard Francis Burton and the formidable Francisco Pizarro, the Conquistador who conquered the Incas. On the other hand, Matt finds solace in the company of friendly individuals such as the renowned American author Samuel Clemens, also known as Mark Twain, and Tomoe Gozen, a 12th-century Japanese warrior from the time of the Genpei War who is wedded to Minamoto no Yoshinaka.

Along with the other heroes, Matt soon discovers that Riverworld is not a mere afterlife and is controlled by otherworldly caretakers who are engaged in a civil war.

== Cast ==
- Tahmoh Penikett as Matt Ellman
- Laura Vandervoort as Jessie Machalan
- Mark Deklin as Samuel Clemens
- Bruce Ramsay as Francisco Pizarro
- Peter Wingfield as Richard Burton
- Jeananne Goossen as Tomoe Gozen
- Matthew MacCaull as Hal
- Matty Finochio as Antonio
- Romina D'Ugo as Allegra Braccioforte de Venezia
- Kwesi Ameyaw as Youseff
- Meg Roe as Amalie Faberge
- Thea Gill as Female Caretaker
- Alan Cumming as Traitor Caretaker
- Arnold Pinnock as Simon Moody
- Michael Adamthwaite as Evgeny
- Terry Chen as Eddie
- Alessandro Juliani as Daniel
- Panou as Male Caretaker
- Alex Zahara as Ludwig Dürr
- Chiara Zanni as Deb
- Aleks Paunovic as Bernardo
- Peter Shinkoda as Yoshinaka
- Anakin Adams as Garren
- Sharmaine Yeoh as Waitress
- Potjana Khong-Jaroen as Girl

=== Caretakers ===
Riverworld's Caretakers, beings depicted as blue-skinned and cloaked in robes, assume the role of overseers. They are attributed with the creation of Riverworld, at times referred to as "demons". The Caretakers exist in two distinct factions: the Salvationists, driven by the desire to dismantle Riverworld and advance to grander pursuits, and the Second Chancers, who strive to safeguard Riverworld. This division has sparked a civil war, with each faction led by resolute figures.

The leader of the Salvationists perceives their opponent as lacking vision of the broader implications, whereas the leader of the Second Chancers views their adversary as a self-serving betrayer seeking personal gain. In pursuit of their respective objectives, both factions clandestinely enlist champions, despite their laws strictly forbidding direct interference with humans.

== Nature of the river ==
Riverworld is a fictional setting characterized by an endless or seemingly infinite river. Within this world, a unique trait grants every human being effective immortality, preserving their perpetual youth and robust health, irrespective of their age at the time of their demise on Earth. These inhabitants exhibit remarkable resilience in recovering swiftly from injuries and display a heightened resistance to various diseases. While they can experience death, the remarkable aspect of Riverworld is the phenomenon of resurrection, wherein deceased individuals are continuously reborn at different locations along the river.

A notable aspect of this peculiar realm is the existence of a phenomenon known as the "suicide express," where some individuals deliberately seek death to be reborn at various points along the river, thus utilizing the river's resurrection mechanism as a means of transportation.

Each individual in Riverworld is bestowed with a solid metal bracelet called a "grail band." This device serves as a means for obtaining sustenance, as it provides access to food and beverages. However, champions within Riverworld are an exception; they are deliberately sent into the realm without these grail bands, symbolizing their liberation from the constraints of Riverworld. It is later unveiled that this exclusion from the grail bands not only grants them freedom but also acts as a mechanism to evade the vigilant surveillance of the caretakers of Riverworld. This enables those involved in the ongoing civil war to maintain greater mobility and remain inconspicuous to their opposing forces.

The source of the river, known as the "Dark Tower," holds profound significance in Riverworld. It serves as both the origin of the river itself and the core essence of the entire realm, signifying its central importance. The name "Dark Tower" draws a parallel with one of the novels in the Riverworld series, The Dark Design.

== Transportation ==
The two main forms of transportation are the riverboat and the zeppelin. The riverboat Not-for-Hire was built by Samuel Clemens, while the zeppelin was built by the man who built the Hindenburg and is called Herumfurzen (which means in German to fart around). Both use what is suspected by one of the characters to be a fusion power source.
