= Maxine Bahns =

American actress, model

- Occupations: Actress, triathlete, model
- Years active: 1995–present
- Website: www.maxinebahns.net

Maxine Bahns is an American actress, triathlete, and model. She is best known for roles in the films The Brothers McMullen and She's the One, appearing in both as the love interest of Edward Burns, who directed both films. She also appeared, uncredited, as the murdered wife of the protagonist of the television show The Mentalist.

== Career ==
Bahns's big break came when Edward Burns asked her to star in his low-budget film The Brothers McMullen. In 1996, she co-starred in She's the One opposite Burns, marking the couple's last collaboration before their split. In 1997, she made her television debut on the HBO science-fiction/horror series Perversions of Science, guest-starring in the episode "People's Choice". She starred in the 1998 film Chick Flick.

In 2000, she co-starred in the made-for-television movie Cutaway opposite actor Tom Berenger, and in three films: the crime/thriller Dangerous Curves opposite actors Robert Carradine and David Carradine; the comedy/drama Vice opposite Bo Hopkins; and the comedy Spin Cycle opposite actress Sarah Chalke. The following year, she co-starred in the film The Elite opposite actor Jurgen Prochnow. In 2005, she was in the direct-to-video horror film Scarred, and guest-starred on an episode of CBS's mystery/drama series CSI: NY episode "Dancing with the Fishes".

In 2007, she co-starred in the drama film Steam opposite actresses Ruby Dee, Ally Sheedy, and Kate Siegel; she also made two guest appearances on television: FOX's legal drama Justice episode "False Confession", and NBC's comedy/drama series Studio 60 on the Sunset Strip for two episode. In 2008, Bahns co-starred in the horror/thriller film Conjurer opposite actor Andrew Bowen. That same year, she made an uncredited appearance as Simon Baker's murdered wife Angela Ruskin-Jane on CBS's The Mentalist.

Bahns returned to the silver screen in 2009, in the drama Stellina Blue, opposite actress Christina Mauro; the crime/drama-thriller The Hitmen Diaries: Charlie Valentine, starring Raymond J. Barry; and in the adventure/horror-thriller The Lost Tribe starring Emily Baldoni. In 2010, she co-starred in the film What Would Jesus Do? opposite John Schneider, and made a guest appearance in the "Money for Nothing" episode of TNT's police procedural/crime-drama series Rizzoli & Isles.

In 2011, she appeared in the comedy film Naked Run starring actor Charles Durning, and made an uncredited guest appearance on the NBC police procedural/legal drama Law & Order: LA episode "Silver Lake". In 2012, she co-starred in the comedy/drama romance film Driving Me Crazy opposite actor Keith Black. She did not return to acting until 2017, when she appeared in the drama film Web Cam Girls starring actress Arianne Zucker. In 2018, she made a guest appearance on the Amazon Video crime/drama-thriller series Too Old to Die Young.

Bahns has also been involved in modelling, working for the Elite Model Management. During her time as a model, she appeared in numerous magazines including FHM, Sports Illustrated for Women, Self, Glamour, and Maxim.

== Filmography ==
=== Film ===
Year	Title	Role	Notes
1995	The Brothers McMullen	Audrey	film debut
1996	She's the One	Hope Davis	
1998	Chick Flick		
2000	Dangerous Curves	Stella Crosby	
2000	Vice	Savannah Logan	
2000	Spin Cycle	Vicky Taylor	
2001	The Elite	Lena	
2005	Scarred	Heather Hanson	Direct-to-Video
2007	Steam	Susan	
2008	Conjurer	Helen Burnett	
2009	Stellina Blue	Kathy	
2009	The Hitmen Diaries: Charlie Valentine	Jenny	also known as "Charlie Valentine"
2009	The Lost Tribe	Maya	
2010	What Would Jesus Do?	Virginia	
2011	Naked Run	Jill	
2012	A Glimpse Inside the Mind of Charles Swan III	Mom	uncredited
2012	Driving Me Crazy	Kelly Petterson	
2017	Web Cam Girls	Detective Sarzo	

=== Television ===
Year	Title	Role	Notes
1997	Perversions of Science	Betty Sorensen	Episode: "People's Choice"
2000	Cutaway	Star	Television Movie
2005	CSI: NY	Elementary School Representative	Episode: "Dancing with the Fishes"
2007	Justice	Deborah Rose	Episode: "False Confession"
2007	Studio 60 on the Sunset Strip	Lena	2 episodes
2008, 2010	The Mentalist	Angela Ruskin Jane	3 episodes (uncredited)
2010	Rizzoli & Isles	Jocelyn Fairfield	Episode: "Money for Nothing"
2011	Law & Order: LA	Kathy Alvin	Episode: "Silver Lake" (uncredited)
2019	Too Old To Die Young	Rebecca Gilkins	Episode: "#1.3"
