= Black Pearl (Pirates of the Caribbean) =

Fictional ship in the Pirates of the Caribbean film series

- Pirates of the Caribbean vehicle
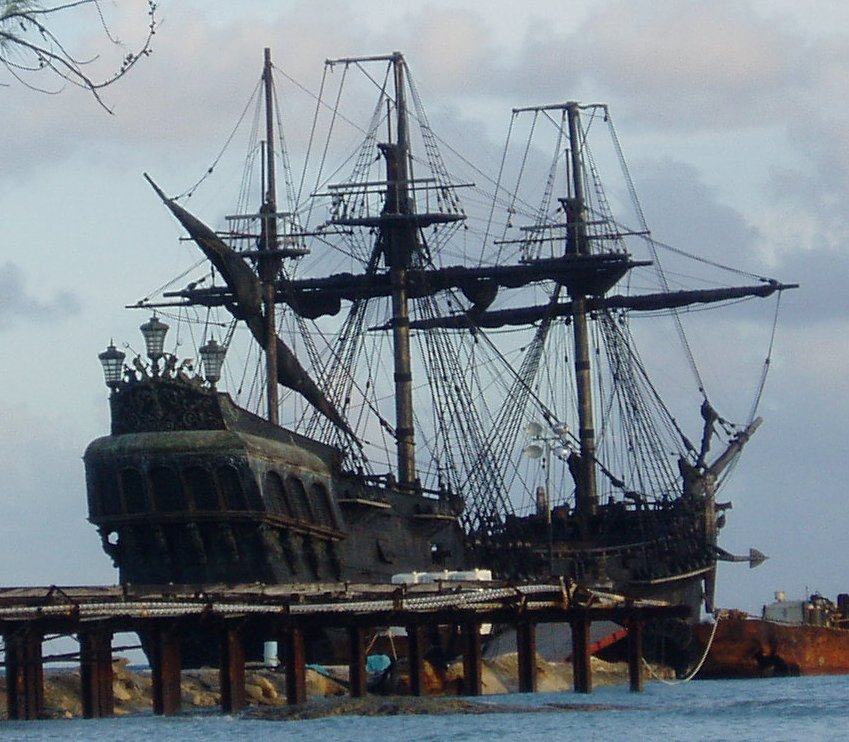
- The Black Pearl on location
- First appearance: The Curse of the Black Pearl
- Captain: Jack Sparrow; Hector Barbossa (temporarily)

General characteristics
- Type: East Indiaman; Galleon
- Armaments: 12-pound cannons x32
- Length: 165 ft (50.292 m)

The Black Pearl (formerly known as the merchant ship Wicked Wench) is a fictional ship in the Pirates of the Caribbean film series. In the screenplay, the ship is easily recognized by her distinctive black hull and sails. Captained by Captain Jack Sparrow and Hector Barbossa, the Black Pearl is said to be "nigh uncatchable". In the first three films, she either overtakes or flees all other ships, including both the Interceptor, which is regarded as the fastest ship in the Caribbean, and the Flying Dutchman, which is faster than the wind. Her speed is derived from several factors such as the large number of sails she carries and being partly supernatural. As stated in Dead Man's Chest and At World's End, the Black Pearl is "the only ship that can outrun the Dutchman" and this is evidenced in the maelstrom battle between the two ships in the movies.

== Background ==
The Black Pearl is the titular pirate ship that appears in Pirates of the Caribbean: The Curse of the Black Pearl. Similar to how Jack Sparrow was compared to Han Solo from the Star Wars franchise, the Black Pearl was compared to the Millennium Falcon at least once by James Ward Byrkit, a creative consultant of Gore Verbinski's Pirates trilogy, in the Disney+ series Prop Culture. "It's Jack Sparrow's Millennium Falcon. You know? It's his ship that he loves so much. So you have to not hate it, you actually have to think it's kind of beautiful." As hinted in the films' backstory, the Black Pearl was once a merchant ship named Wicked Wench while Jack Sparrow was a merchant sailor for the East India Trading Company. The name Wicked Wench originates from the Pirates of the Caribbean attraction at Disneyland Park, which is shown shelling a fort.

The backstory for the merchant ship Wicked Wench is further detailed by A.C. Crispin in the 2011 Disney Publishing novel, Pirates of the Caribbean: The Price of Freedom, due to Crispin reading the screenplay for Pirates of the Caribbean: At World's End, though the scenes were deleted from the final cut of the film. The Wicked Wench was registered to the East India Trading Company and owned by Cutler Beckett, the EITC Director for West Africa. At the time, Jack Sparrow was in the employ of the East India Trading Company and regained captaincy of the Wicked Wench (this fits in with reality as history notes that pirates did not build ships specifically to commit piracy. Instead, they either bought or stole small, fast vessels and then retrofitted them with heavy armaments). Jack Sparrow captained the Wicked Wench for Cutler Beckett for about a year, hauling various cargoes, but he refused to haul slaves. Hoping to recruit Sparrow as one of his many "operatives", Beckett indulged what he regarded as an odd peccadillo of Sparrow's until he and the captain came to part ways. Beckett had dispatched Sparrow on a mission to find the lost island of Kerma and the treasure at the heart of its underground labyrinth, but Sparrow double-crossed the EITC official and claimed he couldn't locate the island. Suspicious that Sparrow had indeed found the island and the treasure, but had not given him its accurate location, Beckett determined to browbeat the captain into obedience and demanded that the young captain transport a cargo of slaves to the New World. Initially, Sparrow agreed, but when he realized that he was betraying the Wicked Wench, as well as himself, he rebelled and freed the slaves by taking them to Kerma for safe asylum. Furious that Sparrow had flouted his orders and stolen the "cargo" of "black gold", Beckett had Sparrow thrown into jail. After allowing him to languish for a couple of months, Beckett had Sparrow transported to the Wicked Wench's anchorage, about a mile from the coast of West Africa, near Calabar on the Bight of Benin. After personally branding Sparrow with the "P" brand (so he'd be forever identifiable as a pirate), Cutler Beckett gave the order to fire incendiary carcass charges at the Wicked Wench, to demoralize her captain. Sparrow fought his way free from his guards, dove overboard, and attempted to rescue his burning, foundering ship, but he was too late. The Wicked Wench turned into an inferno, then sank, taking Jack with her. But, while dying, Sparrow called upon Davy Jones, and struck a bargain with him: his soul and one hundred years of service aboard the Flying Dutchman, in return for continued human existence of thirteen years as captain, plus saving the Wicked Wench and transforming her into the fastest, most dangerous pirate ship on the seven seas. Jones agreed and raised the ship from the sea floor, now a charred vessel with an angel figurehead. In keeping with her scorched appearance, Jack painted his ship black and added black sails, rechristening her "the Black Pearl".

In the 2017 film Pirates of the Caribbean: Dead Men Tell No Tales, a ship named the Wicked Wench makes its appearance during a flashback sequence, although it was never stated that whether or not it was an older version of the Black Pearl or if the two ships were the same vessel. In the flashback, as reminisced upon by Spanish Royal Navy Captain Armando Salazar, the Silent Mary attacked pirate ships in battle until Captain Morgan died aboard the Wicked Wench, giving captaincy to young "Jack the Sparrow". Sparrow outmaneuvers Salazar while being chased into the Devil's Triangle, in which the pirate crew of the Wicked Wench throws ropes around nearby reefs off the port side and uses the rigging to slingshot the ship in the opposite direction. Jack steers the ship through the reef, saving the crew and the ship by changing the ship's course at the last second. Afterward, on the deck of the Wicked Wench, the crew rewards Sparrow with "tribute" and bestows Jack with his famous hat and other personal effects.

== Appearances ==
=== Before the films ===
Jack Sparrow's Jolly Roger, originally associated with Henry Every.

In Dead Man's Chest, it was revealed that Davy Jones raised the Black Pearl from the depths and allowed Jack Sparrow to captain the ship for thirteen years in exchange for his soul and servitude aboard the Flying Dutchman. According to Jack, he was only captain for two years until he was viciously mutinied upon, despite introducing himself as Captain Jack Sparrow all those years. The mutiny occurred two years after the deal with Davy Jones, when Jack sailed the Black Pearl and had his magical compass in search of the mysterious Isla de Muerta, where the legendary Treasure of Cortés was hidden. By this point, Hector Barbossa was Jack's first mate and Bootstrap Bill Turner had joined the crew. However, the other crew members, Pintel and Ragetti, were recruited in Tortuga. Captain and crew agreed to equal shares of the treasure, but devious Barbossa persuaded Jack that equal shares included knowing the treasure's location. Jack complied, and soon after Barbossa led a mutiny and marooned Jack on an island with nothing but a pistol containing one shot.

Barbossa's crew sailed the Black Pearl to Isla de Muerta and found the Aztec gold, which was spent very quickly, not believing in the curse placed on it: that anyone who stole the coins would become an undead being, unable to feel anything but insatiable hunger, and that only moonlight would reveal their proper form. This curse being real, the pirates were soon hideous living skeletons with tattered flesh and clothing clinging to their bones, unable to eat or drink, though still suffering hunger and thirst. Even the Black Pearl was affected by the curse upon its crew, becoming constantly shrouded in an eerie mist and operating with tattered sails ripped in many places.

=== The Curse of the Black Pearl ===
Barbossa's Jolly Roger which has been erroneously attributed to John Rackham

The curse could only be lifted when all eight hundred and eighty-two coins were returned to the chest along with a trace of blood from each pirate who stole one. William "Bootstrap Bill" Turner Sr., the only crew member who defended Jack Sparrow during the mutiny, sent a coin to his young son Will Turner in England, believing the crew "deserved to be cursed, and remain cursed". In retaliation, Barbossa (as Pintel put it), "strapped a cannon to old Bootstrap's bootstraps. The last we saw of old Bill Turner... he was sinking to the crushing black oblivion of Davy Jones' locker". Only then did Barbossa's crew learn that they also needed Bootstrap's blood to break the curse, and by throwing him overboard, they had doomed themselves to continued damnation.

Over the next decade, the Black Pearl menaced the Caribbean as the pirates searched tirelessly for the Aztec gold until all but one piece was found. As a boy, William "Will" Turner Jr. brought the gold medallion with him on his journey to the Caribbean. However, Elizabeth Swann, Governor Weatherby Swann's daughter, came into possession of it and kept it hidden for eight years. The Pearl later attacked Port Royal and abducted Elizabeth, believing she was Bootstrap's child and thus their only remaining source of Turner's blood.

The Pearl was eventually commandeered by Sparrow with a new crew. While most of Barbossa's crew were battling the Royal Navy aboard HMS Dauntless, Barbossa, Monk, and Jacoby fight Elizabeth, Will, and a now-cursed Jack Sparrow at Isla de Muerta. After Will and Jack put their blood on their respective pieces and returned them to the chest of Cortés, the Aztec curse was lifted. With the crew no longer immortal, Jack used his single shot, which he had carried for ten years, to kill Barbossa. During the battle, Jack's crew commandeer the Pearl, leaving Jack behind at Isla de Muerta. However, they later rescue him after he escapes execution in Port Royal, and he again takes command of the ship.

=== Between the first and second installments ===
The Black Pearl was pursued by Commodore James Norrington and the Royal Navy. Off of Tripoli, a large hurricane battered the Pearl (though it survived), and HMS Dauntless sank, along with most of its crew. Norrington survived and later resigned from the Navy.

=== Dead Man's Chest ===
One year later, the Black Pearl is still being captained by Jack Sparrow, although his crew is not content with him; it's been months since they did "a speck of honest pirating", and they are upset about the Royal Navy's pursuit, the Isla de Muerta being flooded and the hurricane. Davy Jones sends Bootstrap Bill Turner to remind Jack that he still owes his soul and one hundred years of service aboard the Flying Dutchman to Jones; Jack's thirteen years of captaincy have now passed. Jack is marked with the black spot, which means that the Kraken is now hunting to drag both Sparrow and his ship down to the Locker.

Jack has the ship sailed to the nearest land - Pelegosto, an island inhabited by a cannibal tribe. Jack and the surviving crew escape the cannibals with Will Turner, Pintel, and Ragetti, and visit the voodoo priestess Tia Dalma for advice. Dalma details how Davy Jones cut out his own heart and locked it in the hidden "Dead Man's Chest". The crew learns that if Jones' heart is stabbed, he will die, so whoever controls Jones' heart can command Jones himself. Dalma then helps the crew of the Pearl track down the Flying Dutchman. When Jack sends Will over to the Dutchman, the Pearl is boarded by Jones' cursed crew. Jack makes a deal with Davy Jones; he will deliver Jones 100 souls in three days in exchange for his own. Jones agrees, temporarily removing the Black Spot from Jack's palm. Jones and his crew then depart aboard the Dutchman with Will (who is "a good-faith payment"), while the Pearl travels to Tortuga to "recruit" the remaining 99 souls.

In Tortuga, Jack runs into Elizabeth and a drunk, washed-up James Norrington. Owing to her desire to find Will, Elizabeth can provide Jack with a heading to the dead man's chest, which is buried on Isla Cruces. With each desiring control of Jones for his ends, a triple-threat sword fight ensues between Jack, Norrington, and Will (who has escaped from the Dutchman with the help of his father). After Jack manages to obtain the heart of Davy Jones from the chest (which is secretly stolen from him by Norrington), the Black Pearl is attacked by the Flying Dutchman. However, the Pearl can outrun the Dutchman owing to a favorable wind (the Pearl being faster with the wind). Davy Jones then unleashes the Kraken on the Pearl. Despite successfully fighting the Kraken off twice, the ship still sustains heavy damage and most of her crew are killed. Jack orders the surviving crew to abandon the ship. After figuring out that the Kraken is only after Jack and not the Pearl, Elizabeth distracts Jack by suggesting she might let her kiss him, but he turns her down, unaware, until it is too late, that she has shackled him to the ship's mast. She leaves him to his fate, but not before being informed by Jack that she has abandoned her refined and noble upbringing and is, indeed, a pirate. Embracing his fate, Jack bravely charges the maw of the Kraken and the Pearl is dragged down to Davy Jones' Locker as the surviving crew watches. Mourning the loss of Sparrow, the crew returns to Tia Dalma's shack. There, Dalma asks them if they would "sail to the ends of the Earth and beyond, to fetch back 'witty Jack' and him precious Pearl". Gibbs, Pintel, Ragetti, Cotton's parrot (who speaks for both itself and its master), Elizabeth, and Will all agree. Tia Dalma then announces their new captain, Hector Barbossa, who asks what's become of "his" ship.

=== At World's End ===
Led by the newly resurrected Captain Barbossa, Tia Dalma and the crew of the Black Pearl vow to rescue Jack Sparrow and his ship from Davy Jones' Locker. Using Chinese navigational charts from the Pirate Lord of Singapore, Sao Feng, they find themselves in the Locker. Jack and the Pearl are stranded in a seemingly-endless desert, but Tia Dalma can use the Locker's mysterious crustaceans (crabs that look like rocks) to transport Jack and the Pearl to the nearby shore. Jack deciphers a clue from the navigational charts, and the crew capsizes the ship at sunset. The Black Pearl then returns to the living world at sunrise.

Back in the realm of the living, the Black Pearl resupplies at an island, but is ambushed by Sao Feng (aboard his vessel Empress) and Jack's old enemy Cutler Beckett (aboard his flagship HMS Endeavour). Disputes mean that the Pearl is now desired by multiple characters. Captain Sparrow claims that it is his ship; Captain Barbossa is that it was his ship; Will needs the Pearl to free his father from Davy Jones; Sao Feng covets the fastest ship in the Caribbean, and Cutler Beckett won't "give up the only ship that can outrun the Dutchman". After Elizabeth joins Sao Feng on the Empress, the Pearl and the Empress launch a surprise attack on the Endeavour and flee. In response, Beckett sends the Flying Dutchman to track down the Empress. Sao Feng is mortally wounded in the ensuing attack and dies after naming Elizabeth his successor as captain. Meanwhile, the Black Pearl escapes to "Shipwreck Cove", a secret pirate rendezvous, where the fourth meeting of the Brethren Court is then convened. After Captain Elizabeth Swann arrives, the Pearl becomes the flagship of the Pirate Armada, led by the elected Pirate King, Elizabeth Swann.

Captain Sparrow, Captain Barbossa, and Captain Swann take a parley with Lord Beckett, Davy Jones, and Will Turner (who was pushed overboard by Sparrow for his attempted mutiny on the crew of the Pearl). After Beckett reveals that Jack purposefully used Will's betrayal to try to save himself from Jones' wrath, Captains Swann and Barbossa trade Jack for Will; Jack is then imprisoned in the brig of the Dutchman. Helmed by Captain Barbossa, the Black Pearl then engages in a sea battle around a maelstrom against the Flying Dutchman. The two ships are evenly matched, and both are damaged by the other's cannons and later boarded. On the Dutchman, Jack escapes the brig and engages Davy Jones in a sword fight. Stealing the key to the dead man's chest from Jones, Jack threatens his foe by stabbing Jones' heart. However, Jones fatally stabs a downed Will Turner, and Jack instead helps Will to stab Jones' heart, killing Jones. As both ships near the bottom of the maelstrom, the topmasts become entangled. The Dutchman begins to pull down both ships, so Pintel and Ragetti fire a chain shot at the entangled masts. Jack and Elizabeth escape the Dutchman using a makeshift parasail, and Pearl escapes the maelstrom while the Dutchman sinks. Once the storm subsides, the Pearl is still afloat but substantially damaged, and no match for the Endeavour which is advancing on it. However, the Dutchman resurfaces with Captain Will Turner in command. The Black Pearl and the Flying Dutchman sail alongside each other and destroy the Endeavor, killing Lord Cutler Beckett and forcing the now-leaderless EITC armada to flee.

In Tortuga, Jack again loses the Black Pearl to Barbossa, leaving only him and Gibbs on Tortuga, Gibbs decides to stay and they part ways with Jack saying "Take What You Can" and Gibbs replying "Give Nothing Back", though the crew of the Pearl (including Pintel, Ragetti, Marty, Murtogg, and Mullroy), "are unsettled about leaving Captain Jack behind - again", indeed they all leave the Black Pearl and Barbossa recruits a new crew. However, Sparrow has secretly stolen the critical portion of Barbossa's navigational charts, and so goes back to searching for the Pearl and the Fountain of Youth so he can gain immortality.

=== Between the third and fourth installments ===
One night, sometime after leaving Tortuga, the Black Pearl was attacked by the pirate ship Queen Anne's Revenge, captained by the infamous Blackbeard. Using the supernatural powers embedded within the Sword of Triton, Blackbeard brought the rigging of the Pearl to life, wrapping around Barbossa's crew "like snakes" and were swiftly defeated. To survive the attack, Barbossa was forced to cut off his leg to escape the doomed Pearl. Believing the Black Pearl to be sunk, Barbossa had revenge as a goal and pursued Blackbeard ever since, with an obsessive passion. However, unbeknownst to Barbossa, (Note: Screenwriter Terry Rossio released his unproduced screenplay for Pirates of the Caribbean: Dead Men Tell No Tales (2017), which includes additional information in extensive footnotes. Pertaining to On Stranger Tides, Rossio notes that Jack and Barbossa were each conning the other, while not knowing they were at the same time being conned. Barbossa does not know that the Black Pearl in a bottle, and Jack does not know the importance of Blackbeard's sword.) Blackbeard captured the Black Pearl, magicked the ship into a bottle for good measure, then added it to a collection of other conquered ships inside a cabinet found in the captain's quarters of the Queen Anne's Revenge.

=== On Stranger Tides ===
During the quest for the Fountain of Youth, Jack Sparrow met Hector Barbossa, now a privateer serving King George II's expedition for the Fountain, who insisted that his beloved Pearl was sunk, though Jack told Barbossa he should've been sunk with it. However, after being shanghaied aboard the Queen Anne's Revenge, Jack was shown the current state of the Black Pearl by Blackbeard's daughter, Angelica, who revealed Blackbeard kept each ship in a bottle as a prize. Angelica also told that Blackbeard was after the Fountain of Youth to save himself from getting killed by a "one-leg man" "At fortnight, Blackbeard will meet his death...". While Jack learned about the ships in bottles, Barbossa still believed the Pearl to be sunk as his true agenda for revenge against Blackbeard was revealed. As Barbossa mortally wounded Blackbeard with a poisoned sword, he says, "For the Pearl."

Before Blackbeard's death at the Fountain, Sparrow sent Gibbs to retrieve the Pearl, though Gibbs fills a large sack with the bottles of other fallen ships from Queen Anne's Revenge. As the film concludes, Jack suggests a way of getting the Pearl out of the bottle and back to full size, but it will require "a crossbow, an hourglass, three goats, one of [them] must learn to play the trumpet, whilst the other one goes like this" to which Gibbs says he knows someone who owns a goat and Sparrow replies "good and I can go like this" ("this" being a wiggling of the fingers). Meanwhile, Barbossa was made captain of the Queen Anne's Revenge and holds the Sword of Triton.

=== Dead Men Tell No Tales (Also called Salazar's Revenge) ===
The Black Pearl appears once again in the fifth installment of the movie franchise, which takes place over 20 years after At World's End and about one year after On Stranger Tides. It is first seen as a ship in a bottle, still kept in Captain Jack Sparrow's possession. According to Hector Barbossa, who still believes the Pearl to be sunk, Blackbeard's attack on the Black Pearl was revealed to have happened "five winters ago."

A flashback sequence features a pirate ship with the name Wicked Wench on the stern, although it was never made clear whether or not the pirate ship was an older version of the Black Pearl or if the two ships were one and the same vessel. In the flashback, as reminisced upon by Spanish Royal Navy Captain Armando Salazar, the Silent Mary attacked pirate ships in battle, during which Captain Morgan died aboard the Wicked Wench, giving captaincy to young "Jack the Sparrow". Sparrow outmaneuvers Salazar while being chased into the Devil's Triangle, in which the crew of the Wicked Wench throw ropes around nearby reefs off the port side and use the rigging to slingshot the ship in the opposite direction. Jack steers the ship through the reef, saving the crew and the ship by changing the ship's course at the last second. Afterward, on the deck of the Wicked Wench, the crew rewards Sparrow with "tribute" and bestows Jack with his famous hat and other personal effects. But unbeknownst to Jack, Salazar and the crew of the Silent Mary became undead ghosts waiting to be freed to seek revenge.

In the present day, Jack keeps the Black Pearl in a bottle in his pocket even as he is forced to use a smaller ship known as the Dying Gull to go to sea. Meanwhile, after Salazar's return, Captain Hector Barbossa sees Shansa, a sea witch, who tells Barbossa that Jack will sail for the Trident of Poseidon with a pearl. Later in the film, through unconfirmed means, Barbossa is shown to be aware of the Black Pearl as a ship in a bottle and restores the Pearl to its former glory; stabbing the bottle with Blackbeard's sword cracks it, the bottle subsequently breaking as the Pearl grows to the size of a larger model, only regaining its full size when it returns to the sea.

Barbossa then claims the Black Pearl for himself to battle the undead Captain Salazar, tying Jack to the rear of the ship; however, Jack managed to escape thanks to the help of Henry Turner, son of Will Turner and Elizabeth Swann, who has allied with him to find the Trident of Poseidon. After tracking down the island where the Trident is located, triggering a mystical convergence that opens a trench in the ocean, Salazar claims the Trident for himself, but Henry and Carina Smyth destroy the Trident when Salazar attempts to use it to kill Jack. The destruction of the Trident restores Salazar and his men to a full life but also causes the sea trench to collapse, with the Pearl's crew lowering its anchor to pull Jack, Henry, and Carina to safety. Salazar attempts to climb up the anchor to attack Jack, but Barbossa sacrifices himself to stab Salazar and save the others (Carina having been identified as Barbossa's daughter). At the film's conclusion, Carina and Henry watch Will Turner's reunion with Elizabeth Swan due to the destruction of the Trident, also freeing Will from his role as captain of the Flying Dutchman. Jack departs as he is restored to his traditional role as the captain of the Black Pearl with both his crew from the Dying Gull and Barbossa's crew from the Queen Anne's Revenge joining him.

== Armament ==
The Black Pearl is moderately armed and carries 32 twelve-pound cannons: 18 on the gun deck and 14 on the upper deck. Its full broadside contains 16 cannonballs that weigh 192 lb (192 pounds (87 kg)). Extremely unusual for a pirate ship, the Pearl has no chase guns (cannons used while being chased or chasing, as a regular broadside volley cannot be used in this situation) in her bow or stern, giving her a grave tactical disadvantage during a chase as the Pearl cannot shoot a ship it is chasing or return fire at a pursuer; her high speed only partially negates this handicap. In Dead Man's Chest another advantage the Black Pearl has over her enemies is her ability to hide in the sea at night, since if all the ship's lamps are blown out, the ship is no longer visible, thanks to her black hull and sails. This is also seen in Curse of the Black Pearl where she can sneak unhindered into Port Royal under the cover of darkness.

== Filming ==
In the first movie, the Black Pearl was a steel barge with wooden structures built on top to resemble a real ship. In addition, a soundstage set was used to achieve better control over fog machines. For the second and third movies, a floating sailing ship was built in the shipyards at Bayou La Batre in Alabama on the hull of the cargo ship Sunset to serve as the set, though it is not an authentic tall ship. Another version, mounted on a gimbal, was built for filming the Maelstrom battle. In 2010, the Sunset, which played the Black Pearl in most of the films, was reconstructed to portray the Queen Anne's Revenge in Pirates of the Caribbean: On Stranger Tides.
