= Pirates of the Caribbean: Dead Man's Chest =

2006 film by Gore Verbinski

- Theatrical release poster
- Directed by: Gore Verbinski
- Written by: Ted Elliott; Terry Rossio
- Based on: Characters by; Ted Elliott; Terry Rossio; Stuart Beattie; Jay Wolpert; Walt Disney's Pirates of the Caribbean
- Produced by: Jerry Bruckheimer
- Starring: Johnny Depp; Orlando Bloom; Keira Knightley; Stellan Skarsgård; Bill Nighy; Jack Davenport; Kevin R. McNally; Jonathan Pryce
- Cinematography: Dariusz Wolski
- Edited by: Craig Wood; Stephen Rivkin
- Music by: Hans Zimmer
- Production companies: Walt Disney Pictures; Jerry Bruckheimer Films
- Distributed by: Buena Vista Pictures Distribution
- Release dates: June 24, 2006 (Disneyland Resort); July 7, 2006 (United States)
- Running time: 150 minutes
- Country: United States
- Language: English
- Budget: $225 million
- Box office: $1.066 billion

Pirates of the Caribbean: Dead Man's Chest is a 2006 American swashbuckler film directed by Gore Verbinski, written by Ted Elliott and Terry Rossio, and produced by Jerry Bruckheimer. The sequel to Pirates of the Caribbean: The Curse of the Black Pearl (2003), it is the second installment in the Pirates of the Caribbean film series. It is set a year after the first film and follows Captain Jack Sparrow who owes a debt to Davy Jones (Bill Nighy), the ghastly captain of the Flying Dutchman, and being marked for death and pursued by the Kraken. Meanwhile, the wedding of Will Turner (Orlando Bloom) and Elizabeth Swann (Keira Knightley) is interrupted by Lord Cutler Beckett (Tom Hollander), who wants Turner to acquire Jack's magic compass in a bid to find the Dead Man's Chest.

Two sequels to Pirates of the Caribbean: The Curse of the Black Pearl were conceived in 2004, with Elliott and Rossio developing a story arc that would span both films. Filming took place from February to September 2005 in Palos Verdes, Saint Vincent and the Grenadines, Dominica, and The Bahamas, as well as on sets constructed at Walt Disney Studios. It was shot back-to-back with the third film of the series, At World's End (2007). With a production budget of $225 million, it was the most expensive film ever made at the time of its release.

Dead Man's Chest premiered at the Disneyland Resort on June 24, 2006, and was released in the United States on July 7, to mixed reviews from critics. The film broke several records at the time, including the opening-weekend record in the United States with $136 million and the fastest film to gross over $1 billion at the worldwide box office (63 days), and became the highest-grossing film of 2006, the third highest-grossing film of all time at the time of its release, and the highest-grossing film in the series. It was also the highest-grossing film released by Disney until it was surpassed by Toy Story 3 in 2010. The film received four nominations at the 79th Academy Awards (winning Best Visual Effects). The sequel, At World's End, was released in 2007.

== Plot ==
About one year after Will Turner and Elizabeth Swann helped Captain Jack Sparrow escape from Port Royal, (Note: As depicted in Pirates of the Caribbean: The Curse of the Black Pearl) their wedding is interrupted by Lord Cutler Beckett of the East India Trading Company, who arrives with arrest warrants. Commodore James Norrington, who has since resigned from the British Navy after losing his ship, HMS Dauntless, in a hurricane while pursuing Jack, also has a warrant. Later, revealing Letters of Marque signed by King George, Beckett offers to free Will and Elizabeth in exchange for recovering Sparrow's compass.

Meanwhile, aboard the Black Pearl, Jack is visited by Will's father, Bootstrap Bill Turner, now a cursed crewman of the Flying Dutchman, captained by Davy Jones. Jack made a deal with Jones to raise the Pearl from the depths and 13 years as captain, a debt Jack must repay by now serving aboard the Dutchman or he will be dragged into Davy Jones' Locker by the Kraken, after which Bootstrap marks Jack with the Black Spot.

Will finds Jack's crew on an island, helps them escape from a tribe of cannibals, and makes a deal with Jack to find the key to the Dead Man's Chest in return for Jack's compass. Afterward, Jack visits Tia Dalma, a voodoo priestess who helps in finding the chest, which holds Jones' still-beating heart; whoever has it can control Jones. Will is tricked into servitude with Jones' cursed crew aboard the Dutchman in Jack's stead, while Jones agrees to free Jack if he can provide 99 more souls in three days. Will reunites with Bootstrap Bill aboard the Dutchman, and learns that Jones himself possesses the key through a game of Liar's Dice. After Will escapes with the key by climbing aboard the Edinburgh Trader, Jones summons the Kraken to attack the ship, but Will manages to escape.

Meanwhile, Elizabeth is broken out of prison by her father, Governor Swann, who is then captured himself. Elizabeth steals the Letters of Marque from Beckett and makes her way to Tortuga, where she finds both a drunken Norrington and Jack, who tricks Elizabeth into using his compass to find Jones' chest. All parties arrive on Isla Cruces, where the chest is buried. A three-way sword fight breaks out between Jack, Will, and Norrington, who all want the heart for their respective goals: Jack to negate his debt to Jones and call off the Kraken; Will to free his father from the Dutchman; and Norrington to regain his life as a Navy officer. Norrington secretly steals the heart and the Letters of Marque in the chaos before running off, drawing Jones' crew long enough for the others to escape. However, Jones sends the Kraken to attack the Pearl, killing most of Jack's crew and destroying all but one of the lifeboats, which Jack briefly uses to flee before returning to help wound the Kraken with a net full of gunpowder and rum.

As Jack orders the survivors to abandon ship, Elizabeth realizes the Kraken only wants Jack and chains him to the mast so the crew can escape while the Kraken drags Jack and the Pearl to the depths. Seemingly satisfied that Jack’s debt is settled, Jones opens the chest and is enraged to find his heart missing. Norrington gives Beckett the Letters and Jones's heart, thereby reinstating Norrington in the Navy and allowing Beckett to gain control of Jones, the Dutchman, and the Kraken. Jack's crew return to Tia Dalma, and agree about the possibility of rescuing him at "world's end". Tia Dalma introduces their guide: Hector Barbossa, who has been resurrected.

== Cast ==
- Johnny Depp as Captain Jack Sparrow: The eccentric pirate captain of the Black Pearl. He is hunted by the Kraken because of his unpaid debt to Davy Jones. He is also searching for the Dead Man's Chest to free himself from Jones' servitude.
- Orlando Bloom as William Turner: A blacksmith-turned-pirate who strikes a deal with Cutler Beckett to find Jack Sparrow and his compass so he can save both himself and his fiancée Elizabeth from execution. Later he is reunited with, and seeks to free, his father, who eventually owes a lifetime of servitude to Davy Jones.
- Keira Knightley as Elizabeth Swann: Governor Swann's daughter and Will's fiancée, who is arrested on her wedding day for helping Captain Jack Sparrow escape. Escaping jail with help from her father, she meets up with Jack in Tortuga and joins his crew to search for both Will and the chest.
- Stellan Skarsgård as William "Bootstrap Bill" Turner: Will Turner's father and a crewman aboard the Flying Dutchman. Following the mutiny against Jack led by Hector Barbossa, Bootstrap Bill joined Barbossa's crew in finding the cursed Aztec gold on Isla de Muerta, which rendered them immortal as the undead. Tied to a cannon and thrown overboard by Barbossa, Bootstrap was trapped somewhere at the bottom of the ocean before he sold his soul to Davy Jones to alleviate his eternal suffering.
- Bill Nighy as Davy Jones: Captain of the Flying Dutchman. Davy Jones was once a human being. Unable to bear the pain of losing his true love, he carved out his heart and put it into the Dead Man's Chest, then buried it in a secret location. He has become a bizarre creature – part octopus, part crab, part man – and collects the souls of dead or dying sailors to serve aboard his ship for one hundred years. Prior to officially casting Nighy, producers also met Jim Broadbent, Iain Glen and Richard E. Grant for the role. Other actors considered for the role included Christopher Walken and Ian McShane, with the latter being cast later as Blackbeard in Pirates of the Caribbean: On Stranger Tides.
- Jack Davenport as James Norrington: He resigned his commission as Commodore in the Royal Navy after losing his ship and crew in a hurricane off the coast of Tripoli in the pursuit of Jack Sparrow and his crew. Fallen on hard times, he joins the Black Pearl's crew and seeks to regain his honor and career.
- Kevin McNally as Joshamee Gibbs: The Black Pearl's first mate and Jack's loyal friend, he once served in the Royal Navy under Lieutenant James Norrington.
- Jonathan Pryce as Governor Weatherby Swann: Elizabeth's father and governor of Port Royal. He adores his daughter but puts little faith in Will - not considering him the best match for Elizabeth.
- Lee Arenberg as Pintel: Ragetti's inseparable crewmate.
- Mackenzie Crook as Ragetti: A pirate and former Black Pearl crewmember under Captain Barbossa, he was imprisoned after the Aztec curse was broken, but escaped to rejoin Captain Jack Sparrow's Black Pearl crew. He has a wooden eye, and despite being illiterate, has begun "reading" the Bible, with the excuse that "you get credit for trying".
- Tom Hollander as Lord Cutler Beckett: Chairman of the East India Trading Company, he travels to Port Royal to capture and recruit Jack Sparrow as a privateer. What he really desires is Davy Jones' heart, with which he can rule the seas with Jones' commanded servitude. Ricky Gervais was offered the role but turned it down.
- Naomie Harris as Tia Dalma: An obeah priestess with whom Jack bartered for his magic compass. She explains the legend of Davy Jones, in addition to owning a similar locket to his.
- Alex Norton as Captain Bellamy, the pirate captain of the Edinburgh Trader.
- David Bailie as Cotton, a mute member of the Black Pearl's crew.
- Martin Klebba as Marty, a dwarf member of the Black Pearl's crew.
- David Schofield as Ian Mercer, Lord Beckett's second in command
- John Boswall as Wyvern, an ancient member of Davy Jones’ crew who has fused with the ship.
- Derrick O'Connor as Very Old Man, an inexperienced sailor in Jack Sparrow's crew.
- Geoffrey Rush as Hector Barbossa, the former captain of the Black Pearl and Jack Sparrow's former first mate. An uncredited role, having originally met his demise in the previous installment, Barbossa is revealed to have been resurrected by Tia Dalma in the final scene of this film.

== Production ==
=== Development ===
Following the success of Pirates of the Caribbean: The Curse of the Black Pearl (2003), the cast and crew signed on for two more sequels to be shot back-to-back, a practical decision on Disney's part to allow more time with the same cast and crew. Writer Ted Elliott and Terry Rossio decided not to make the sequels new adventures featuring the same characters, as with the Indiana Jones and James Bond series, but to retroactively turn The Curse of the Black Pearl into the first of a trilogy. They wanted to explore the reality of what would happen after Will Turner and Elizabeth Swann's embrace at the end of the first film, and initially considered the Fountain of Youth as the plot device. They settled on introducing Davy Jones, the Flying Dutchman and the Kraken. They also introduced the historical East India Trading Company, who for them represented a counterpoint to the themes of personal freedom represented by pirates.

Planning began in June 2004, and production was much larger than The Curse of the Black Pearl, which was only shot on location in St. Vincent. This time, the sequels would require fully working ships, with a seaworthy Black Pearl built over the body of the Sunset, an unglamorous craft which once serviced oil derricks in the Gulf of Mexico constructed in Bayou La Batre, Alabama. By November, the script was still unfinished as the writers did not want director Gore Verbinski and producer Jerry Bruckheimer to compromise what they had written, so Verbinski worked with James Ward Byrkit to storyboard major sequences without need of a script, while Elliott and Rossio wrote a "preparatory" script for the crew to use before they finished the script they were happy with. By January 2005, with rising costs and no script, Disney executives threatened to cancel the film, but changed their minds. The writers would accompany the crew on location, feeling that the lateness of their rewrites would improve the spontaneity of the cast's performances.

=== Filming ===
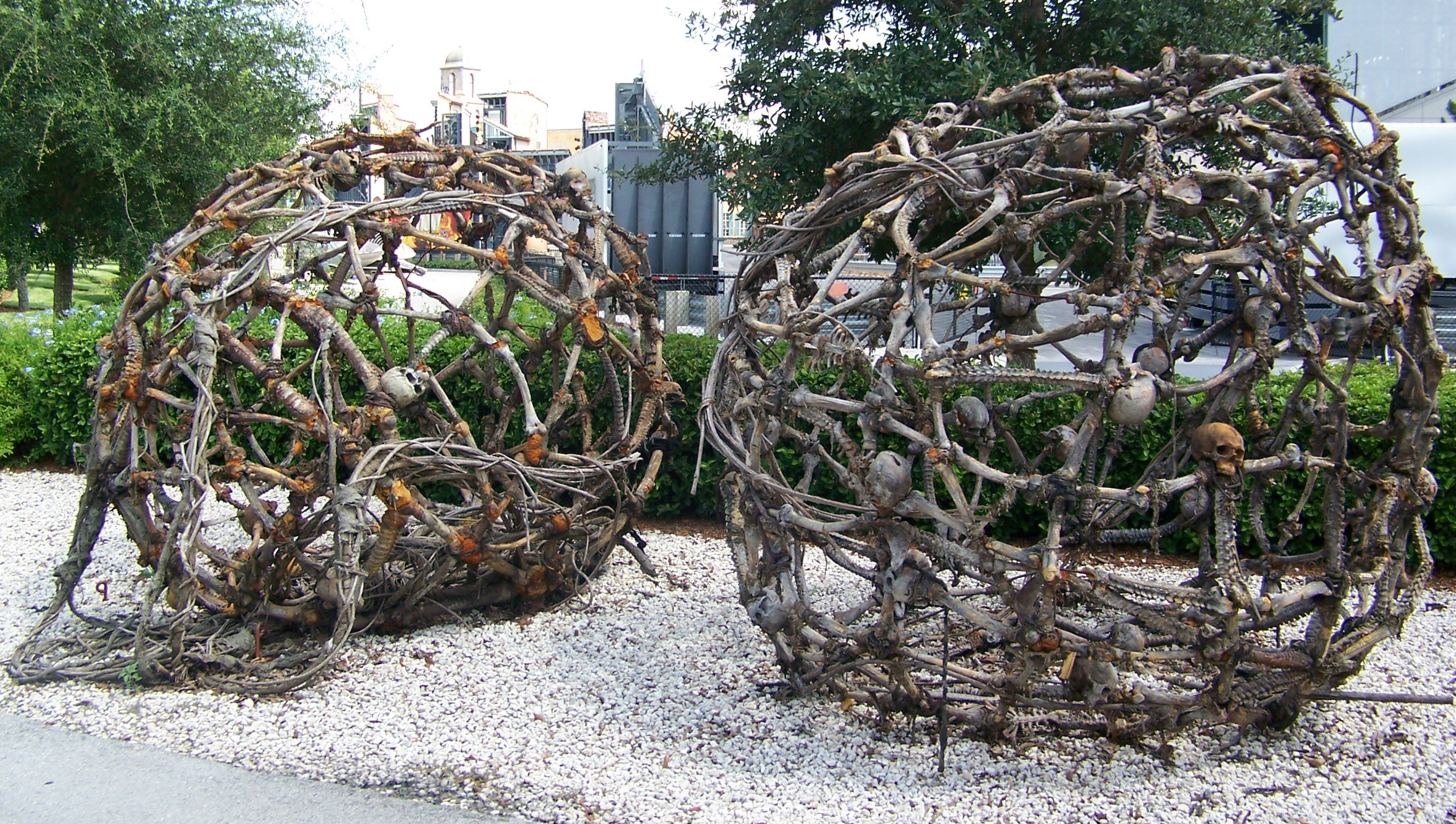
The two bone cages used in one of the early scenes of the film. The cages were on display on the Studio Backlot Tour at Disney's Hollywood Studios until it shut down in 2014.

Principal photography began on February 28, 2005, in Palos Verdes, beginning with Elizabeth's ruined wedding day. For Cutler Beckett's introduction, Rossio and Elliott had him arrive on shore in a boat while sitting on a horse standing in the boat; the duo had originally planned to use this introduction for Don Rafael Montero in The Mask of Zorro (1998), but the scene was cut for being deemed too expensive. Similarly, the Pirates crew wanted to cut the idea for budget reasons, in addition to feel that it would be unbelievable or, as the film's historian dismissed, suicidal. However, Verbinski promised Rossio and Elliott to use the idea and the scene was filmed in one day after weeks of planning and training. The crew spent the first shooting days at Walt Disney Studios in Los Angeles, including the interiors of the Black Pearl and the Edinburgh Trader which Elizabeth stows away on, before moving to St. Vincent to shoot the scenes in Port Royal and Tortuga. Sets from the previous film were reused, having survived three hurricanes, although the main pier had to be rebuilt as it had collapsed in November. The crew had four tall ships at their disposal to populate the backgrounds, which were painted differently on each side for economy. One of the ships used was the replica of HMS Bounty used in Mutiny on the Bounty (1962).

On April 18, 2005, the crew began shooting in Dominica, a location Verbinski had selected as he felt it fitted the sense of remoteness he was looking for. However, this was also a problem; the Dominican government were completely unprepared for the scale of a Hollywood production, and the 500-strong crew occupying around 90% of the roads on the island had trouble moving around on the underdeveloped surfaces. The weather also alternated between torrential rainstorms and hot temperatures, the latter of which was made worse for the cast who had to wear period clothing. In Dominica, the sequences involving Pelegosto (Cannibal Island) and the forest segment of the battle on Isla Cruces were shot. Verbinski preferred to use practical props for the giant wheel and bone cage sequences, feeling long close-up shots would help further suspend the audience's disbelief. Dominica was also used for Tia Dalma's shack. Filming on the island concluded on May 26, 2005.

The crew moved to a small island in the Bahamas called White Cay for the beginning and end of the Isla Cruces battle, before production took a break until August, where in Los Angeles the interiors of the Flying Dutchman were shot. After cutting her hair short for her role in Domino (2005), Keira Knightley had to wear hair extensions while filming. Naomie Harris filmed all of her scenes over the weekends, which happened during her simultaneous Miami Vice (2006) schedule. On September 18, 2005, the crew moved to Grand Bahama Island to shoot ship exteriors, including the working Black Pearl and Flying Dutchman. Filming there was a tumultuous period, starting with the fact that the tank had not actually been finished. The hurricane season caused many pauses in shooting, and Hurricane Wilma damaged many of the accessways and pumps, though no one was hurt nor were any of the ships destroyed. Principal photography was reportedly completed on September 10, 2005. According to Ted Elliott, production wrapped on February 7, 2006, with the last shot made was the raven pecking on Jack Sparrow's coffin. This was after two weeks of filming night scenes, from sunset to sunrise.

The look of the Flying Dutchman was partially inspired by old Dutch "fluyts"—17th-century vessels which resembled galleons—and more specifically, the Vasa, a massive Swedish warship which sank in Stockholm's harbor upon its maiden voyage in 1628 (the ship was salvaged in 1961 and housed in a special museum in the Swedish capital). With its high, heavily ornamented stern, the ship provided a rich foundation for Rick Heinrichs' wilder and more fantastical designs.

One of the stuntmen, Johnny Depp's stunt double Tony Angelotti, was injured on set while filming a "human yo-yo" stunt in July 2005. He was rushed to hospital, suffering internal bleeding after "nicking" a branch off his femoral artery. He lost six units of blood, had an ACL reconstruction and spent a year in recovery, before having to have the surgery all over again when a plate in his pelvis broke. He also suffered from PTSD. Despite this, he did continue filming for the following sequel, At World's End, albeit doing "lighter stunts" like sword choreography or working as a stunt coordinator. However, in 2007, Angelotti did sue Disney and Bruckheimer for the injury.

=== Visual effects ===
Davy Jones and the Flying Dutchman's crew members were originally conceived by Elliott and Rossio as ghosts, but Verbinski disliked this and designed them as physical creatures. Their hierarchy is reflected by how mutated they were: newcomers had low level infections which resemble rosacea, while veterans had full-blown undersea creature attributes. Verbinski wanted to keep them realistic, rejecting a character with a turtle shell, and the animators watched various David Attenborough documentaries to study the movement of sea anemones and mussels. All of the crew are computer-generated, with the exception of Stellan Skarsgård, who played "Bootstrap" Bill Turner. Initially his prosthetics would be augmented with CGI but that was abandoned. Skarsgård spent four hours in the make-up chair and was dubbed "Bouillabaisse" on set.

Davy Jones had originally been designed with chin growths, before the designers made the move to full-blown tentacles; the skin of the character incorporates the texture of a coffee-stained Styrofoam cup among other elements. To portray Jones on set, Bill Nighy wore a motion capture tracksuit that meant the animators at Industrial Light & Magic did not have to reshoot the scene in the studio without him or on the motion capture stage. Nighy wore make-up around his eyes and mouth to splice into the computer-generated shots, but the images of his eyes and mouth were not used. Nighy only wore a prosthetic once, with blue-colored tentacles for when Will Turner (Orlando Bloom) steals the key to the Dead Man's Chest from under his "beard" as he sleeps. To create the CGI version of the character, the model was closely based on a full-body scan of Nighy, with Jones reflecting his high cheekbones. Animators studied every frame of Nighy's performance: the actor himself had blessed them by making his performance more quirky than expected, providing endless fun for them. His performance also meant new controls had to be stored. Finally, Jones' tentacles are mostly a simulation, though at times they were hand-animated when they act as limbs for the character.

The Kraken was difficult to animate as it had no real-life reference, until animation director Hal Hickel instructed the crew to watch King Kong vs. Godzilla (1962) which featured a live octopus crawling over miniatures. On the set, two pipes filled with 30,000 pounds (14,000 kg) of cement were used to crash and split the Edinburgh Trader: Completing the illusion are miniature masts and falling stuntmen shot on a bluescreen stage. The scene where the Kraken spits at Jack Sparrow does not use computer-generated spit: it was real slime thrown at Depp.

== Marketing ==
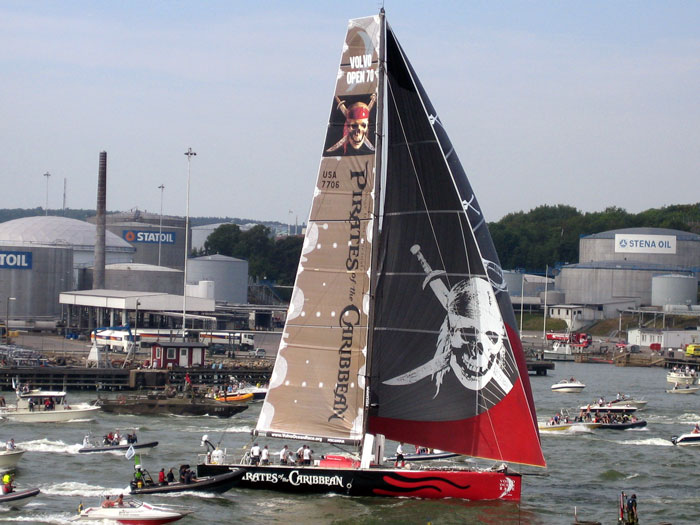
Pirates wins the final leg

The first trailer was released in December 2005, being attached to The Chronicles of Narnia: The Lion, the Witch and the Wardrobe. Disney produced a comic book adaption in their Junior Graphic Novels: Pirates of the Caribbean: Dead Man's Chest (2007). Disney sponsored a racing yacht in the 2005 event of the Volvo Ocean Race. The boat, aptly named Black Pearl, raced under the team name "Pirates of the Caribbean" for the United States. The boat itself was a Volvo Open 70 class yacht designed by Farr Yacht Design. She was skippered to a 2nd-place finish by American Paul Cayard after 31,000 nm (57,000 km), divided into 9 legs, taking 8 months to complete.

== Release ==
=== Theatrical ===
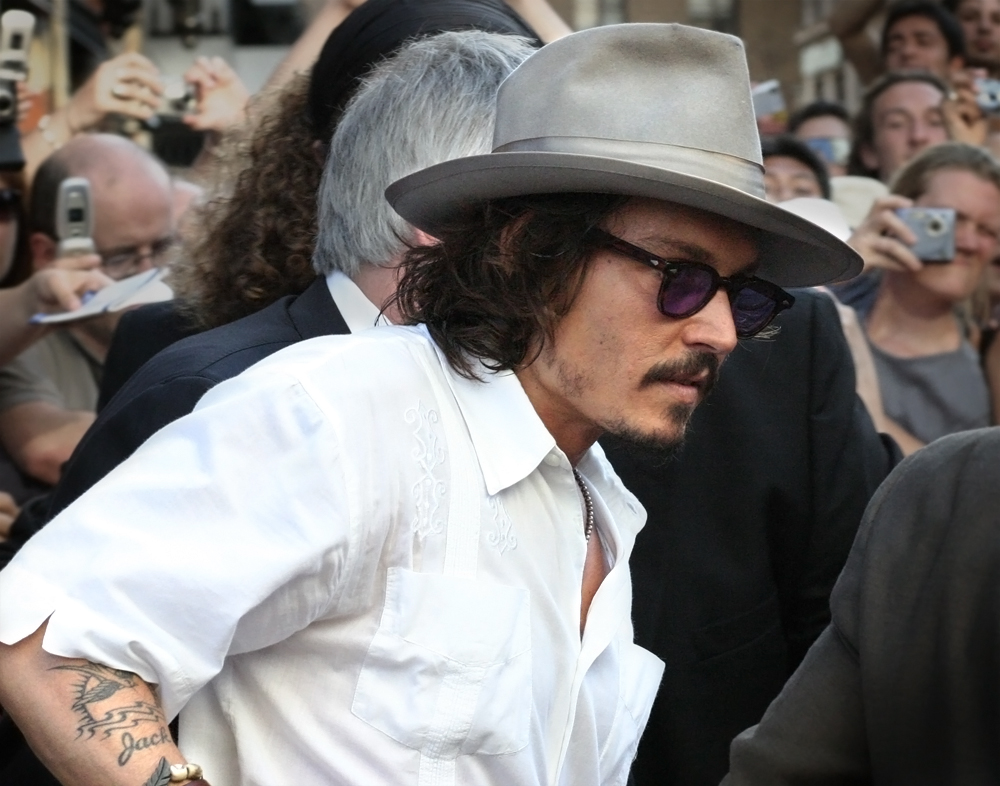
Johnny Depp at the London premiere for the film in June 2006

Pirates of the Caribbean: Dead Man's Chest premiered at Disneyland in California on June 24, 2006. The film had the third-highest number of theaters upon its release, after Shrek 2 and Spider-Man 2, playing at 4,133 locations. It became the fourth film of the year to open in 4,000 theaters, following Mission: Impossible III, Over the Hedge and Superman Returns. It was the first Disney film to use the computer-generated Walt Disney Pictures logo from 2006 to 2022, which took a year for the studio to design. Wētā FX and yU+co were responsible for the logo's final animated rendering and Mark Mancina was hired to score a new composition and arrangement of "When You Wish Upon a Star". The new fanfare was co-arranged and orchestrated by David Metzger. The main people responsible for the logo's rendering are Cyrese Parrish and Cameron Smith.

=== Home media ===
The film became available on DVD on November 20, 2006, in the UK and December 5, 2006, in the US. It sold 9,498,304 units in its first week of sales (equivalent to $174,039,324). In total, it sold 16,694,937 units, earning $320,871,909. It was the best-selling DVD of 2006 in terms of units sold and second in terms of sales revenue behind The Chronicles of Narnia: The Lion, the Witch and the Wardrobe.

The DVD contained a commentary track with the screenwriters and a gag reel, with the double-disc featuring a video of the film premiere and a number of documentaries, including a full-length documentary entitled "According to the Plan" and eight featurettes. The film was released on Blu-ray Disc on May 22, 2007. The film had its UK Television premiere on Boxing Day 2008 on BBC One at 20:30. It was seen by 6.8 million viewers according to overnight figures.

== Reception ==
=== Box office ===
Dead Man's Chest earned $423,315,812 in North America and $642,863,913 in other territories, for a worldwide total of $1,066,179,725. Worldwide, it ranks as the 15th highest-grossing film distributed by Disney, the highest-grossing film of 2006, and the highest-grossing film in the Pirates of the Caribbean series. It was the third film in history after Titanic and The Lord of the Rings: The Return of the King to reach the $1 billion mark worldwide and the first Disney film to reach $1 billion worldwide, and it reached the mark in record time (63 days), a record that has since been surpassed by many films, of which the first was Avatar (in January 2010).

In North America, the film broke many records, including the largest opening- and single-day gross ($55.8 million), surpassing Star Wars: Episode III – Revenge of the Sith, the highest Friday gross, beating out X-Men: The Last Stand and the biggest opening-weekend gross ($135.6 million), dethroning Spider-Man. It also surpassed Spider-Man 2 to have the highest July opening-weekend of any film. Furthermore, it achieved the least time to reach the $100, $200 and $300 million marks, in addition to the highest ten-day gross. However, most of them were broken by Spider-Man 3 in May 2007 and The Dark Knight in July 2008. During its first weekend, Dead Man's Chest reached the top of the box office, beating Superman Returns and The Devil Wears Prada. The film was in first place at the box office for three consecutive weekends, making it one of the only two films of the year to achieve this feat, with the other being Happy Feet. By late August 2006, it would go on to break Finding Nemo's record for becoming Disney's highest-grossing film at the time. It closed in theaters on December 7, 2006, with a $423.3 million haul. Thus, in North America, it is the seventeenth-highest-grossing film, although, adjusted for inflation, the film ranks forty-eight. It is also the highest-grossing 2006 film, the highest-grossing Pirates of the Caribbean film, and the seventh-highest-grossing Disney film. The film sold an estimated 64,628,400 tickets in the US.

Outside North America, it is the twenty-first-highest-grossing film, the third-highest-grossing Pirates film, the eighth-highest-grossing Disney film and the highest-grossing film of 2006. In the UK, Dead Man's Chest collected $18.4 million in its opening-weekend, the biggest of the year, replacing Ice Age: The Meltdown. It set opening-weekend records in Russia and the CIS, Ukraine, Finland, Malaysia, Singapore, Greece and Italy. It was on top of the box office outside North America for 9 consecutive weekends and 10 in total. It was the highest-grossing film of 2006 in Australia, Bulgaria, Germany, Japan, the Netherlands, New Zealand, Spain, Sweden and Thailand.

=== Critical response ===
On Rotten Tomatoes, Pirates of the Caribbean: Dead Man's Chest has an approval rating of 53% based on 229 reviews, with an average rating of 6.00/10. The site's critical consensus reads, "Gone is Depp's unpredictability and much of the humor and originality of the first movie." At Metacritic, which assigns a weighted average rating to reviews, the film received an average score of 53 out of 100, based on 37 critics, indicating "mixed or average" reviews. Audiences polled by CinemaScore gave the film an average grade of "A−" on an A+ to F scale.

Michael Booth of The Denver Post gave the film three-and-a-half stars out of four, calling it "two hours and 20 minutes of escapism that once again makes the movies safe for guilt-free fun." Drew McWeeny compared the film to The Empire Strikes Back, and also acclaimed its darkness in its depiction of the crew of the Flying Dutchman and its cliffhanger. The completely computer-generated Davy Jones turned out to be so realistic that some reviewers mistakenly identified Nighy as wearing prosthetic makeup.

Christy Lemire of Associated Press described it as, "Even more cartoonish than the original film from 2003 -- a difficult feat to achieve -- this second installment in the Pirates of the Caribbean franchise, often feels like a live-action version of a Road Runner-Wile E. Coyote extravaganza." A. O. Scott of The New York Times said, "You put down your money – still less than $10 in most cities – and in return you get two and a half hours of spirited swashbuckling, and Gore Verbinski has an appropriate sense of mischief, as a well as a gift, nearly equaling those of Peter Jackson and Steven Spielberg, for integrating CGI seamlessly into his cinematic compositions." Empire gave the film three out of five stars, stating, "Depp is once again an unmitigated joy as Captain Sparrow, delivering another eye-darting, word-slurring turn with some wonderful slapstick flourishes. Indeed, Rossio and Elliot smartly exploit these in some wonderful action set-pieces." "We don't get the predictable 'all friends together on the same quest' structure, and there's a surfeit of surprises, crosses and double-crosses and cheeky character beats which stay true to the original's anti-heroic sense of fun. After all, Jack Sparrow is a pirate, a bad guy in a hero's hat, a man driven by self-gain over concern for the greater good, who will run away from a fight and cheat his 'friends' without a second's thought."

Paul Arendt of the BBC compared it to The Matrix Reloaded (2003), as a complex film that merely led onto the next film. Richard George felt a "better construct of Dead Man's Chest and At World's End would have been to take 90 minutes of Chest, mix it with all of End and then cut that film in two." Alex Billington felt the third film "almost makes the second film in the series obsolete or dulls it down enough that we can accept it in our trilogy DVD collections without ever watching it." Mark Kermode of The Observer accused the film of "lumpen direction, lousy writing and pouting performances", but wrote that "the worst thing about Dead Man's Chest is its interminable length [...] The entire Pirates of the Caribbean franchise may be a horrible indicator of the decline of narrative cinema."

=== Accolades ===
At the 79th Academy Awards, visual effects supervisors John Knoll, Hal Hickel, Charles Gibson, and Allen Hall won an Academy Award for Best Visual Effects which was also the first time since 1994's Forrest Gump that Industrial Light & Magic had received that particular Academy Award. The film was also nominated for Best Art Direction, Sound Editing, and Sound Mixing.

The film also won a BAFTA and Satellite award for Best Visual Effects, and six awards from the Visual Effects Society.

Other awards won by the film include Choice Movie: Action, Choice Movie Actor: Action for Johnny Depp at the Favorite Movie, Movie Drama, Male Actor for Depp and On-Screen Couple for Depp and Keira Knightley at the 33rd People's Choice Awards; Best Movie and Performance for Depp at the 2007 MTV Movie Awards and Best Special Effects at the Saturn Awards, and Favorite Movie at the 2007 Kids' Choice Awards.

== Video game ==
A video game adaptation of the film was developed by Griptonite Games and Amaze Entertainment and released by Buena Vista Games in June–August 2006 for the PlayStation Portable, Nintendo DS and Game Boy Advance.
