= Black (2024 film) =

2024 Indian Tamil-language film

- Theatrical release poster
- Directed by: KG Balasubramani
- Written by: KG Balasubramani; AJ Suren
- Based on: Coherence (English) by James Ward Byrkit
- Produced by: S. R. Prakash Babu; S. R. Prabhu; P Gopinath; Thanga Prabaharan R
- Starring: Jiiva; Priya Bhavani Shankar; Vivek Prasanna; Yog Japee
- Cinematography: Gokul Benoy
- Edited by: Philomin Raj
- Music by: Sam C. S.
- Production company: Potential Studios LLP
- Release date: 11 October 2024
- Running time: 117 minutes
- Country: India
- Language: Tamil

Black is a 2024 Indian Tamil-language science fiction horror thriller film directed by KG Balasubramani in his directoral debut and it is produced by Potential Studios. The film stars Jiiva and Priya Bhavani Shankar in the lead roles, alongside Vivek Prasanna, Yog Japee and Swayam Siddha. It is an adaptation of the 2013 American film Coherence, directed by James Ward Byrkit. The film follows newlyweds Vasanth and Aranya who go on a vacation but realize they are stuck in a wormhole which changes timeline each time they pass it.

The film was officially announced in August 2024 under the official title, Black. Principal photography commenced and wrapped before the film's announcement. The film has music composed by Sam C. S., cinematography handled by Gokul Benoy and editing by Philomin Raj.

== Plot ==
In 1964, under the glow of a supermoon on a rainy night, three people—Ganesh and Lalitha, a couple who have eloped to marry and their friend, Manohar—travel together by car. Manohar appears to support their union, but in reality, he harbors sinister intentions and is secretly in love with Lalitha. Along the way, they encounter a mud-stuck cart, blocking their path carrying a heavy angel statue, far too heavy for a single person to move. After maneuvering past it, they reach Manohar's beach house and settle in for the night. Later, Manohar gets drunk and gets his pistol from his car. As he tries to creep toward the couple's room from his car, intending to kill them, he witnesses the lights in his beach house and the street flickering. But before he can act, an impulsive noise startles him, and he walks toward the street, away from his beach house. A gunshot rings out from the house, and when he bursts into the room where his friends are sleeping, he finds them dead. Horrified, he tries asking a barely alive Ganesh about the killer, only to realize the terrifying truth of who it is.

60 years later, in the present day, Vasanth and Aaranya, a married couple often at odds, try to navigate their relationship's rocky terrain. One night at a pub, Vasanth gets into a fight, leaving Aaranya deeply disappointed. To make amends, he proposes a vacation but Aaranya suggests a weekend trip to their new apartment in a quiet township. As they drive, they pass a statue from 1964 prominently erected along their route. Being the first residents in the apartment complex, they are alone for that night and they intend to stay with a single security guard on duty. According to the township promoters, the angel statue, rooted since 1964, remains in place due to a history of mysterious events thwarting relocation attempts, leading the church to deem it divinely intended to stay. They buy some supplies from a nearby store and settle in for the night. Their first abnormal encounters are mysterious painting gifted by a mysterious person and the absence of a security guard to open the main gateway. Vasanth and Aaranya retire for the day and when start to make love, the power goes off and the same impulse noise sounds again. With no one to switch on the power backup, they go to the parking area alone to turn it on. Aaranya sees some stranger in the nick of time but she cannot see anyone. She is however sure that someone is there. The events startle them further with the ringing of the doorbell. To their surprise, it is Vasanth's friend, annoyed at what he says is a late-night call from them about some issue. Vasanth and Aaranya, who have made no such call, are baffled but bid him goodbye saying that they have no problems.

Later, Aaranya notices lights in the opposite apartment, surprising her since they were told they were the only occupants in the entire township. Then, strange occurrences begin to unfold. They spot a mirror image of their apartment across from theirs, complete with identical furniture, drinks, and decor. Alarmed, they watch as a curtain in their apartment suddenly catches fire; yet, once they put it out, it looks as if nothing happened. They receive a mysterious painting from an anonymous sender, only for it to shatter on its own and then reappear whole. Panicked, Aaranya calls friends and emergency services for help. Vasanth, hoping to communicate with the neighbors across, throws a note through the door only to have it returned to their apartment. Suddenly, an intruder breaks in and attacks Vasanth; it is another version of himself. Vasanth wrestles with this doppelgänger until Aaranya intervenes, driving the attacking Vasanth away.

Gradually, Vasanth realizes that these strange events occur whenever they cross a pitch-black area between the two apartments. Though he does not fully understand it, he senses that this darkness is key to their troubles. Each time they pass through it, they shift to a different timeline. In one timeline, they observe themselves calling their friend for help in one timeline but the friend arrives in another timeline before they make the call. In one timeline, the curtains catch fire and they extinguish them and in another timeline, the curtain remains intact. In one timeline, they had put off all the candles once the power backup was turned on but in another timeline, all those candles are in lit state. Determined to figure it out, Vasanth and Aaranya cross the darkness again. This time, both Vasanth and Aaranya see Vasanth in a secretive conversation with Aaranya's friend, discussing some incident at the pub sounding like something happened between them and they should forget about it and about the mysterious painting, which, Aaranya realizes, was sent as a gift from her friend. Misinterpreting this conversation, she suspects an affair between Vasanth and her friend. Vasanth tries to explain that her friend was the one who has made unwanted advances towards him, but Aaranya, unconvinced, storms off across the darkness alone. Vasanth chases after her, only to realize he is too late and she has entered a different timeline.

Now alone, Vasanth is detained by the police, who have arrived in response to Aaranya's distress call. Unable to explain her sudden disappearance, he escapes custody, attacks the officers, and returns to the township. En route, he spots an old car, and a strange instinct drives him to follow it. The car leads him to the home of Manohar, now an elderly man. Manohar reveals the secret behind the strange events: the pitch-black area is a wormhole connecting parallel timelines, activated by the supermoon. He arrived at the same place upon hearing the impulsive noise again, the township is the place where his beach house previously was and he lost it in a property dispute, thereafter, understanding that the wormhole has opened once again. The same wormhole had opened on that fateful night in 1964, allowing him to witness his alternate-self murdering Ganesh and Lalitha. He theorizes that Vasanth and Aaranya's parallel versions might continue to meet them across timelines, even though each person can only exist in one timeline at a time and that is their reality. Manohar warns Vasanth that he must either reunite with the original Aaranya before the supermoon fades or eliminate his parallel self to secure his place in the reality he is in now.

With renewed determination, Vasanth returns to the township, crossing the darkness over and over, searching for the timeline in which Aaranya is still angry but unreachable. Exhausted and nearly defeated, he finally encounters a police patrol, just as Aaranya arrives with a friend. Relieved, Vasanth embraces her, certain he has found the right timeline and is reunited with his wife. As they drive home, Aaranya expresses concern over his prolonged absence since the power went off and he left to switch the power backup. Shocked, Vasanth realizes she is not aware of the night's strange occurrences, and he is not in his intended timeline implying that he has lost the original Aaranya forever and that yet another parallel version of himself is still active in this reality.

Moments later, Vasanth excuses himself to use the restroom at a gas station. He suddenly comes across his alternate-self standing behind him in one of the stalls. He joins Aaranya back in their car, with a mysterious smile on his face, leaving the audience unsure of the fate of the original Vasanth.

== Cast ==
- Jiiva as Vasanth
- Priya Bhavani Shankar as Aaranya Vasanth
- Vivek Prasanna as Manohar
- Yog Japee as Inspector Sivaraj
- Shah Ra as Suresh, Vasanth's friend
- Swayam Siddha as Prabha, Aaranya's friend
- Sindhoori as Lalitha
- Raja Rudrakodi as Ganesh
- Bharath Sivarajan as Vasanth's friend
- Sam as Vasanth's friend
- Mahimai Raj as a Villa security
- Dharma Raj Ganesh as a Villa Manager
- GV Krishna as a pub fight person
- Pop Suresh as a pub fight person

== Production ==
On 29 August 2024, Potential Studios announced their next thriller project titled Black directed by debutant director KG Balasubramani through a first-look poster starring Jiiva and Priya Bhavani Shankar. The film marks the second collaboration of the lead actors together after Kalathil Santhippom (2021). The first look revealed the film to release in September having Jiiva who was last seen in his romantic comedy-drama film Varalaru Mukkiyam (2022) making his comeback after two years. The films also features Shah Ra, Vivek Prasanna, Yog Japee and Swayam Siddha in supporting roles. Principal photography took place in Chennai.

Music composer Sam C.S, editor Philomin Raj, cinematographer Gokul Benoy, art director Sathees Kumar, and stunt choreographer Metro Mahesh were chosen for the technical crew. Lyrics were handled by Madhan Karky and Chandru while Sherif handled the choreography.

== Music ==
Black

Soundtrack album by Sam C. S.
- Genre: Film soundtrack
- Language: Tamil
- Producer: Sam C. S.

Sam C. S. chronology
| Thekku Vadakku (2024) | Black (2024) | KA (2024) |

Singles from Black
- 1. "En Chella Kedi" Released: 7 October 2024; 2. "Majili Majili" Released: 17 October 2024

The background and soundtrack is composed by Sam C. S. On 7 October, the first single "En Chella Kedi" was released, with lyrics penned by Sam C. S and sung by Kapil Kapilan and Ranina Reddy. The second single "Majili Majili" was released on 17 October.

Track listing
| No. | Title | Writer(s) | Singer(s) | Length |
|---|---|---|---|---|
| 1. | "En Chella Kedi" | Sam C. S. | Kapil Kapilan, Ranina Reddy | 4:28 |
| 2. | "Majili Majili" | Madhan Karky | Sam C. S, Sameera Bharadwaj | 3:22 |

== Release ==
=== Theatrical ===
Black released on 11 October 2024, coinciding with Ayudha Puja. The film was granted a U/A certificate from the Central Board of Film Certification (CBFC) with an official runtime of 118 minutes.

=== Home media ===
The digital streaming rights of the film were acquired by Amazon Prime Video, while the satellite rights of the film were sold to Star Vijay. It began streaming on Amazon Prime Video from 1 November 2024, coinciding with Diwali.

=== Marketing ===
At a pre-release event, the makers confirmed that the film is an official remake of a Hollywood sci-fi thriller film, without revealing the name, but the netizens found some similarities of Black with the 2013 psychological thriller film Coherence directed by James Ward Byrkit, which was confirmed post-release.

== Reception ==
Avinash Ramachandran of The Indian Express gave 3.5/5 stars and wrote "Director KG Balasubramani presents to us a very knotty affair in Black, and tries to neatly unravel it all by the time the end credits pop up [...] Black manages to be all of this, and yet always has something up its sleeve to keep us on the edge of our seats." Gopinath Rajendran of The Hindu wrote, "Black does justice to the genre without taking its viewers for granted and spoon-feeding information" and further opined that "Black manages to keep us at the edge of our seats for the most part."

Prashanth Vallavan of Cinema Express gave 2.5/5 stars and wrote "Black once again proves to us that no matter the execution, the heart of a story (or its lack thereof) will always decide how much we connect with a film." Abhinav Subramanian of The Times of India gave 2.5/5 stars and wrote "It (Black) is the kind of film that can leave some viewers confused, while others familiar with the multiverse theory would understand the director's intentions."

Anusha Sundar of OTT Play gave 2.5/5 stars and wrote "[...] had the film explored the scientific aspect in greater depth coupled with abled writing, Black would have become a appreciable new attempt in Tamil cinema." Janani K of India Today gave 2.5/5 stars and wrote "Black is an ambitious attempt and a decent addition to the sci-fi Tamil films.[...] Black would have been much more effective if it had simplified the scientific explanation than it intended to." Ananda Vikatan rated the film 43 out of 100.
