= Terry Notary =

American actor (born 1968)

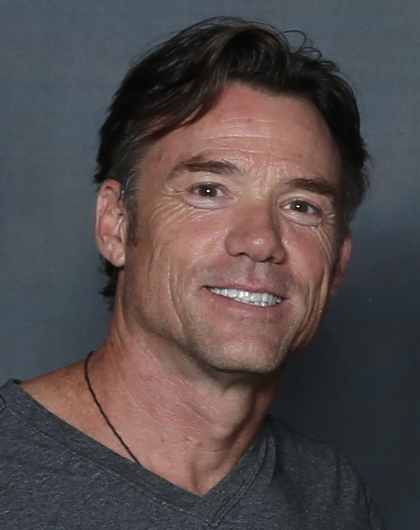
- Notary in 2018
- Born: August 14, 1968 (age 57); San Rafael, California, U.S.
- Occupations: Actor; stunt co-ordinator/double; movement coach

Terry Notary (born August 14, 1968) is an American actor, stunt coordinator/double and movement coach. Notary mainly portrays creatures and animals for the film and television industry, and is known for his motion capture performances in films, including Avatar, The Adventures of Tintin: Secrets of the Unicorn, the Planet of the Apes reboot series, The Hobbit trilogy, and Kong: Skull Island. In 2018, Notary played Cull Obsidian in the Marvel Studios films Avengers: Infinity War and Avengers: Endgame.

== Early life ==
Born in San Rafael, California, Notary was diagnosed as being severely hyperactive at age 7. His parents enrolled him in gymnastics class to burn off excess energy. He won a gymnastics scholarship at the University of California, where he graduated with a major in theatre.

== Career ==
Notary's first career was as a performer with Cirque du Soleil. His first job as a stunt movement coach was on Dr. Seuss' How the Grinch Stole Christmas. Director Ron Howard was hiring Cirque gymnasts for the film, and after sufficiently impressing Howard, Notary was offered the job of teaching all the actors how to move. Notary followed this new career path to Tim Burton's Planet of the Apes, for which he prepared by studying ape movements at the Los Angeles Zoo. Notary's first motion capture film was Avatar, where he was the movement coach for the Na'vi.

Swedish director Ruben Östlund hired Notary when casting his Palme d'Or-winning 2017 film The Square. For Oleg, a character who acts like an ape, Östlund discovered Notary after running a Google search for "actor imitating monkey" and viewing one of Notary's performances (which was for an audition for Planet of the Apes). His performance in that single scene, in which a performance artist acts like a hostile ape at a fancy dinner, was widely praised, The Independent calling it "the most tense, uncomfortable scene of the year."

== Filmography ==
Year	Title	Stunt work	Role
2000	Dr. Seuss' How the Grinch Stole Christmas	Stunt performer / movement coach	—N/a
2001	The Animal	Stunt performer	—N/a
2001	Planet of the Apes	Stunt performer / Tim Roth's stunt double (uncredited) / movement coach	Various ape extras
2001	The Hot Chick	Stunt performer	—N/a
2003	X2	Stunt performer / movement coach	—N/a
2003	Tarzan	Animal movement coach	—N/a
2004	The Village	Movement coach	—N/a
2005	Me and You and Everyone We Know	Stunt coordinator	—N/a
2006	Superman Returns	Stunt performer / movement coach	—N/a
2007	If I Had Known I Was A Genius	Stunt coordinator	—N/a
2007	Slipstream	Stunt coordinator (uncredited)	—N/a
2007	Next	Stunt double (uncredited) / movement coach (uncredited)	—N/a
2007	Fantastic Four: Rise of the Silver Surfer	Stunt performer / Silver Surfer MoCap performer / movement coach	—N/a
2008	The Incredible Hulk	Movement coach / Tim Roth's stunt double (uncredited) / Hulk and Abomination MoCap performers	Soldier (uncredited)
2009	The Forgotten Ones	Stunt coordinator	Alpha Creature
2009	Transformers: Revenge of the Fallen	Movement coach	—N/a
2009	Avatar	Stunts / MoCap performer / movement coach	Banshee (uncredited)
2010	The Lost Tribe	Executive producer / stunt coordinator / movement coach	Alpha Male
2010	Primal	Stunt coordinator	—N/a
2011	Attack the Block	Movement coach	Head Alien
2011	Rise of the Planet of the Apes	Stunt coordinator / Andy Serkis and Richard Ridings's stunt double / movement coach	Rocket / Bright Eyes
2011	The Adventures of Tintin	Stunt coordinator / stunt performer / MoCap performer / movement coach	—N/a
2011	The Cabin in the Woods	Stunt performer / movement coach	Clown
2012	The Hobbit: An Unexpected Journey	MoCap performer / movement coach	Goblin
2013	The Hobbit: The Desolation of Smaug	Stunt performer / movement coach	Goblin / Yazneg (pick-up shots)
2014	Dawn of the Planet of the Apes	Stunt coordinator / movement coach	Rocket
2014	The Hobbit: The Battle of the Five Armies	Movement coach	Laketown Refugee
2016	Warcraft	Stunt coordinator / movement coach	Grommash Hellscream
2017	Kong: Skull Island	MoCap performer	Kong
2017	War for the Planet of the Apes	Stunt coordinator / movement coach	Rocket
2017	The Square	Actor	Oleg
2018	Avengers: Infinity War	Groot MoCap performer	Cull Obsidian (motion capture and voice)
2019	Avengers: Endgame	Groot MoCap performer	Cull Obsidian (motion capture and voice)
2019	The Lion King	MoCap performer	—N/a
2019	Doctor Sleep	Stunt performer / movement coach	—N/a
2020	The Call of the Wild	MoCap performer	Rail Worker / Buck
2022	Nope	MoCap performer	Gordy / The Hiker
2022	Thor: Love and Thunder	Groot MoCap performer	—N/a
2025	The Electric State	MoCap performer	Motion-capture for Mr. Peanut, Pop Fly, Sentre Drones, Ice Cream Bot, Skeeve Bot
2026	Ramayana: Part 1	Action Director / MoCap performer	—N/a
2026	Avengers: Doomsday	Movement coach	—N/a
2027	Ramayana: Part 2	Action Director / MoCap performer	—N/a
