= The Lost Tribe (2010 film) =

- DVD cover
- Directed by: Roel Reiné
- Written by: Mark E. Davidson
- Produced by: Mohit Ramchandani
- Starring: Emily Foxler; Nick Mennell; Marc Bacher; Brianna Brown; Hadley Fraser; Maxine Bahns; Lance Henriksen; Ryan Alosio
- Cinematography: Roel Reiné
- Edited by: Ed Marx; Bayard Stryker
- Music by: Bennett Salvay
- Distributed by: Image Entertainment
- Release date: May 2010
- Running time: 100 minutes
- Country: United States
- Language: English

The Lost Tribe is a 2010 American horror film directed by Roel Reiné, and starring Emily Foxler, Nick Mennell, Brianna Brown, Ryan Alosio and Marc Bacher.

== Plot ==
While on their way to Asia to close a business deal, five friends (Anna, Tom, Joe, Alexis, and Chris) rescue a man that's been left to drift at sea. Injured and in shock, the stranger overrides the yacht's autopilot and attempts to change the vessel's course, but instead wrecks the boat on a rock and the vessel sinks. The castaways wash ashore on the beach of an uncharted island and attempt to contact the Coast Guard over the yacht's radio. Before the Coast Guard can arrive, the body of the stranger vanishes from the grave the other survivors had laid him to rest in. Needing some time to himself, Tom wanders into the jungle and is attacked by an unseen assailant. During the attempt to find Tom the next day Alexis is killed by the jungle's inhabitants and Chris is taken. Joe and Anna discover a nefarious plot by the Vatican to cover up a research team's discoveries on the island before Joe is murdered by an assassin sent by the Catholic Church. Anna is then left by herself to survive on the island and uncover its secrets before assassin is killed by creature.

== Cast ==
- Emily Foxler as Anna
- Nick Mennell as Tom
- Marc Bacher as Joe
- Brianna Brown as Alexis
- Hadley Fraser as Chris
- Maxine Bahns as Maya
- Ryan Alosio as Marcus
- Lance Henriksen as Gallo
- Terry Notary as Alpha Male
- Peter David Parasiliti as Alpha Male (voice)
- Mohit Ramchandani as Man In Church

== Production ==
The Lost Tribe was preceded by an earlier 2009 filmed version of the story, originally produced as The Tribe, that was directed by Jorg Ihle, and which starred Jewel Staite, Justin Baldoni, and Kellan Lutz. After the completion of filming The Tribe, the producers did not like the initial edited cut, and could not get the original cast back to do further reshoots. As a result, the production crew concluded that they had produced a movie that did not live up to their original expectations, and that it would not do well. Thus, they decided to remake the movie under the name The Lost Tribe, but with an entirely new director, script and cast.

== Release ==
Ultimately, The Lost Tribe was not theatrically released either, and was instead released straight to DVD by "Image Entertainment" in 2010. The movie was rated R by the MPAA for "some violence/gore".

== Reception ==
Critical reception for The Lost Tribe has been mostly negative. Dread Central awarded the film a score of 2 out of 5, criticizing the film's daytime setting, and decision to show more of the film's monsters which they called a poor choice. The reviewer also criticized the film's finale as being too simplistic. HorrorNews.net gave the film a positive review, writing, "Lost Tribe has all the quality elements you need from a horror film in that it’s shot well, directed well, flows nicely and has great sound and scoring to it. In fact the sound in this respect brings a lot to the table with really elevating those “jump” moments to a level of respectable inclusion... While there is no denying the derivatives here, its still is an exciting ride of a horror film that goes those extra taboos that a big budget film like Predators wouldn't risk."
