= Coherence (film) =

2013 film by James Ward Byrkit

- Theatrical release poster
- Directed by: James Ward Byrkit
- Screenplay by: James Ward Byrkit
- Story by: James Ward Byrkit; Alex Manugian
- Starring: Hugo Armstrong; Nicholas Brendon; Emily Foxler; Elizabeth Gracen; Lauren Maher; Alex Manugian; Lorene Scafaria; Maury Sterling
- Cinematography: Nic Sadler
- Edited by: Lance Pereira
- Music by: Kristin Øhrn Dyrud
- Production companies: Bellanova Films; Ugly Duckling Films
- Distributed by: Oscilloscope Laboratories
- Release dates: September 19, 2013 (Austin Fantastic Fest); June 20, 2014 (United States)
- Running time: 89 minutes
- Country: United States
- Language: English
- Budget: $50,000
- Box office: $139,745

Coherence is a 2013 American science fiction psychological thriller film written and directed by James Ward Byrkit in his directorial debut. The film had its world debut on September 19, 2013, at Fantastic Fest and stars Emily Foxler as a woman who must deal with strange occurrences following the close passing of a comet.

== Plot ==
On the night that Miller's Comet passes Earth, eight friends gather for a dinner party at the home of couple Mike and Lee. Emily is hesitant to accompany her boyfriend Kevin on an extended business trip abroad. Amir has brought Kevin's ex-girlfriend Laurie, who flirts inappropriately with Kevin.

A power outage occurs. Mike and Lee get out candles and colored glow sticks. The friends each take a blue glow stick and venture outside, where the neighborhood is dark except for one house that has lights. Back inside, they notice a broken glass no one remembers damaging. Amir and Hugh decide to ask to use the phone at the lit-up house, as Hugh's physicist brother had insisted Hugh call him if "anything strange" were to happen during the comet's passing and as no one's mobile phone has a signal.

Hugh and Amir return. Hugh has a cut forehead and Amir has brought back a box he found at the other house containing a ping-pong paddle and photographs of everyone with numbers written on the backs. Hugh says he looked through the window of the other house and saw a table set for eight. They surmise the other house might be an alternate version of theirs.

Hugh writes a note to leave at the other house, only to find an exact copy of the note pinned to their own door. Emily, Kevin, Mike, and Laurie decide to go to the other house. On the way, they encounter another group of four people who look like them, carrying red glow sticks rather than blue. Each group flees back to their houses.

Hugh retrieves his brother's book from his car, which deals with quantum decoherence. They speculate that the comet has created mirror realities, one of which will collapse after the comet has passed. They surmise that anyone passing through a particularly dark area outside will emerge into a different reality. Mike drinks heavily and considers killing their doubles before the doubles can kill them. He decides to write a blackmail note to the other Mike to keep him from the book.

The group realizes Hugh and Amir, in their midst, came from the other house. The two take the box and leave, then return carrying blue glow sticks. They had found two notes at the other house, showing that the split created more than just two alternate realities. Beth sees Laurie kissing Kevin in the hallway. Someone outside smashes Hugh's car window. Emily retrieves the ring Kevin gave her from her car. Talking to Kevin, Emily realizes she is from a different reality.

The group creates their own box to validate they are all from the same reality. In addition to numbering the photographs by rolling dice, they include a randomly chosen object. Emily deduces that only Lee and Beth, who never left the house, originate from that house; she herself, Kevin, and Laurie are from a different house; Hugh and Amir are from a third house; and Mike is from a fourth. The blackmail note arrives under the door, revealing an adulterous liaison between Mike and Beth. Another Mike breaks in, attacks his double and leaves.

Emily goes out and looks into several alternate houses until she finds one in which no one seems aware of the split. She lures everyone out of the house by smashing Hugh's car window, then ambushes the alternate Emily, sedating her with ketamine when she gets a ring out of her car and locking her in the trunk. She takes her other self's place while Miller's Comet breaks apart overhead, but must subdue and hide another Emily who crawls into the bathroom. She takes the ring from her defeated self after losing her own in the altercation, then returns to the living room, where she passes out.

Emily wakes in daylight on the sofa with the rest of the party apparently none the wiser. Kevin returns her ring, which he found in the bathroom. His cell phone rings; bizarrely, Emily is calling. Emily looks at the two rings as Kevin answers the phone and then turns to look at her.

== Cast ==
- Emily Foxler as Emily
- Maury Sterling as Kevin
- Nicholas Brendon as Mike
- Lorene Scafaria as Lee
- Hugo Armstrong as Hugh
- Elizabeth Gracen as Beth
- Alex Manugian as Amir
- Lauren Maher as Laurie
- Aqueela Zoll played one copy of Emily when there were two of them in one scene
- Kelly Donovan, the real-life identical twin brother of Nicholas Brendon, played one copy of Mike when there were two of them in one scene

== Production ==
=== Development ===
Byrkit came up with the idea for Coherence after deciding that he wanted to test the idea of shooting a film "without a crew and without a script." He chose to shoot in his own home and developed the film's science fiction aspect out of necessity, as he wanted to "make a living room feel bigger than just a living room." While Byrkit did have a specific idea for how the film would unfold, he selected improvisational actors and gave them the basic outline of their characters, motivations, and major plot points.

Byrkit told an interviewer, "For about a year, all I did was make charts and maps and drew diagrams of houses, arrows pointing where everyone was going, trying to keep track of different iterations. Months and months of tracking fractured realities, looking up what actual scientists believe about the nature of reality—Schrödinger's cat and all that. I think our whole idea was that it has to be character-based. We want the logic of our internal rules to be sound, and we wanted it to be something people could watch 12 times and still discover a new layer."

=== Casting ===
Byrkit intentionally chose actors who did not know each other. He told an interviewer that, after working on blockbuster films (such as Pirates of the Caribbean: The Curse of the Black Pearl), "I come from theater where I was trained to really just concentrate on story and character on a stage with actors and so I was craving getting rid of everything, getting rid of the crew; getting rid of script, no special effects...just getting back to the purity of that, of a camera in your hand and some actress that you trust and an idea."

When asked whether the actors were people whom Byrkit knew pretty well, he answered, "They were just friends that I knew I could just call up and say, 'Show up at my house in a couple days. I can't really tell you what we're doing. It should be fun!' I had to pick people that seemed to be like they could be couples, seemed like they could be best friends and that I knew were up to the task of jumping into it."

Interviewer Nell Minow confessed her reaction to the actors' relationships: "I just assumed that they all knew each other very well because they fell into the kinds of rhythms that old friends have." Byrkit replied, "That's just casting great people that could do that. Just five minutes after they arrived at my house they had to pretend to be married and lovers and best friends."

Reviewer Matt Prigge praised the choice of casting and their actions: "Byrkit ... focuses not on brainiacs, as in Primer, but on smart but mostly under-informed NPR types, who know enough to slowly piece all this together but not enough that they don't usually descend into blabbering, shouting and drinking. Coherence is largely improvised, with a game cast first believably under-reacting to some weird business with laughter and disbelief, then maintaining a degree of levity even when stuff has gotten real."

=== Writing ===
Ryan Lattanzio wrote, "Byrkit brought eight unwitting actors to his home, threw them a few red herrings and set them loose for five days knowing that the film could evolve organically, like great jazz, if he kept his players in the dark. But he and co-storywriter Alex Manugian weren't just making it up as they went along."

Byrkit has explained that instead of a script he had his own 12-page treatment that he spent about a year working on. It outlined all of the twists and reveals, and character arcs and pieces of the puzzle that needed to happen scene-by-scene. Each day, instead of getting a script, the actors would get a page of notes for their individual character, whether it was a backstory or information about their motivations. They would come prepared for their character only, and had no idea what the other characters received. The result was completely real reactions, and surprises and responses.

Nicholas Brendon, an actor in the film, when discussing the improvisational style of the dialogue with Mandatory journalist Fred Topel, remarked, "Since there was no script, I had no idea how it ended. ... When I saw the movie, I'm like, 'Oh shit, this is awesome!' ... To be quite honest with you, I never really knew what was going on fully until I saw the movie done."

=== Filming ===
Principal photography took place over the course of five nights in Byrkit's house.

As for unforeseen problems in filming, Byrkit admitted, "... you're constantly dealing with unexpected things. One night we tried to shoot outside and we had to make the whole thing look completely desolate and the power being off; that was the one night that we had another movie shooting on our street. So the whole street is completely ablaze with lights and hundreds of extras." Another team was shooting a Snickers commercial. "We would be right in the middle of the dramatic scenes and there would be another knock on the door that would just scare the hell out of everybody..."

=== Music ===
The original score was composed by Kristin Øhrn Dyrud. The song in the closing credits is "Galaxies", from the album Year of Meteors by Laura Veirs.

== Inspirations and themes ==
Byrkit told an interviewer for Spinning Platters, "We came up with the premise in my living room, where the movie is shot. A couple of years ago we were trying to think about what a good low budget, or no budget, movie would be. And, since we didn't have any resources, I had to think of what we actually had. We had a camera. We had some actors who were pretty good, and we had a living room. So we had to find out how to make a living room feel like more than just a living room. And, that led to a whole Twilight Zone type story ... I was craving a more naturalistic type of dialogue, where people overlap and it's very messy, where people talk more like real humans talk. And so, we planned the story for a year, including the twists and turns and reversals and betrayals so that we had a really tight puzzle – almost like a funhouse that we knew we could lead the actors through."

Some reviewers have suggested that Byrkit was influenced by the eeriness of The Twilight Zone and/or the mind-challenging complexities of the science fiction film Primer.

Byrkit answered one interviewer: "Twilight Zone, for sure. Primer wasn't really an influence so much as it was a sign to us that maybe there was an audience for this kind of movie. The actual movie itself is so different than ours that it wasn't as much of an influence as, say, Carnage by Roman Polanski, or other non-sci-fi movies."

== Reception ==
On Rotten Tomatoes, the film has a rating of 89% based on 96 reviews. The site consensus says: "A case study in less-is-more filmmaking, Coherence serves as a compelling low-budget calling card for debuting writer-director James Ward Byrkit." On Metacritic it has a score of 65 based on reviews from 23 critics, indicating "generally favorable" reviews.

Much of the film's praise centered upon its cast, which Bloody Disgusting and Fangoria cited as a highlight. Film School Rejects gave Coherence a positive review, stating that the film's cast was "remarkably grounded for how complicated and bizarre the story is."

Dread Central commented on the film's themes and wrote, "What's frightening about the story is how willing the characters are to abandon the reality they know in favor of one that may be a little more appealing. Whether that's a byproduct of the comet and the rift it creates or caused by the characters undermining everyone else around them to get the life they really want is the fundamental idea of Coherence and what makes it so unsettling."

Clark Collis of Entertainment Weekly praised the film, granting it a B+ rating: "In an impressive big-screen debut from James Ward Byrkit, eight friends discover metaphysics on their menu when a passing comet creates a set of doppelgängers down the road, enjoying their own identical soiree. Byrkit makes the most of the claustrophobic one-house setting, ratcheting up the dread and paranoia as his characters make a string of seemingly reasonable but ultimately wrongheaded decisions. The star-free cast is great too, with Buffy the Vampire Slayer vet Nicholas Brendon poking fun at himself by playing an actor who used to be on a TV show ... Coherence is a satisfying and chilling addition to the ever-growing pal-ocalypse subgenre. And really, you have to love a film that not only explains the concept of Schrödinger's cat but also includes a joke about it ("I'm allergic!").

Stephen Dalton of The Hollywood Reporter also enjoyed the film: "An ingenious micro-budget science-fiction nerve-jangler which takes place entirely at a suburban dinner party, Coherence is a testament to the power of smart ideas and strong ensemble acting over expensive visual pyrotechnics ... A group of eight friends gather for dinner ... Marital tensions and sexual secrets sizzle just below the surface, but relationship drama is soon overshadowed by metaphysical weirdness when a comet passes close to Earth, shutting down power supplies and phone connections ... It slowly becomes clear that the fabric of reality has been radically remixed by the comet's arrival. We are definitely not in Kansas any more ... Byrkit only gave his cast limited information about the narrative loops and swerves ahead, encouraging a semi-improvised naturalism that feels authentically tense."

Matt Zoller Seitz, editor-in-chief of Roger Ebert's website, gave the movie three stars out of four and wrote that the film "is proof that inventive filmmakers can do a lot with a little ... [but] none of the movie's technical or artistic shortcomings prove to be deal-breakers. Once Coherence delves into its premise, the viewer is bound to come down with a bad case of the creeps. This is a less-is-more science fiction-horror tale ... And it's genuinely more of a horror film than a suspense or "terror" film because, while there's some violence, the source of unease is philosophical."

Ryan Lattanzio of Indiewire praised the film's originality: "Coherence is not just smart science fiction: it's a triumph of crafty independent filmmaking, made with few resources and big ambition. Gotham-nominated debut director James Ward Byrkit stripped his vision down to the barest of bones to achieve a mind-shifting, metaphysical freakout about a dinner party gone cosmically awry. This film explodes with ideas, and it has that thing we always hope for at the movies: the element of surprise."

The reviewer for Salon was ambivalent: "After the fundamental problem of Coherence has become clear, or clear-ish – there's another dinner party, at that other house, that looks an awful lot like this one – the movie becomes slightly too much like an unfolding mathematical puzzle, although an ingenious one that reaches a chilling conclusion. Notes appear before they are written, the significance of those numbered photographs comes into focus through a series of neat twists, and while the characters are half-aware that their actions are being shaped by a space-time continuum whose cause-and-effect relationship has gone awry, that's not enough to stop them."

=== Accolades ===
- Next Wave Best Screenplay at the Austin Fantastic Fest (2013, won)
- Maria Award for Best Screenplay at the Sitges Film Festival (2013, won)
- Carnet Jove Jury Award for best In Competition at the Sitges Film Festival (2013, won)
- Black Tulip Award for Best Feature Debut at the Imagine Film Festival (2014, won)
- Imagine Movie Zone Award, Special Mention at the Imagine Film Festival (2014, won)

== Indian adaptation ==
Black, a 2024 Indian Tamil language film written and directed by KG Balasubramani starring Jiiva and Priya Bhavani Shankar, is an adaptation of Coherence.

== See also ==
- Many-minds interpretation
- Many-worlds interpretation
- Multiverse
- Everything Everywhere All at Once
- "The Garden of Forking Paths", a 1941 short story by Argentine writer and poet Jorge Luis Borges
- Dark Matter (2024 TV series)
