= After Dusk They Come =

- Directed by: Jorg Ihle
- Written by: Jorg Ihle; Mohit Ramchandani
- Produced by: Joel Soisson; Jo Bamford
- Starring: Jewel Staite; Justin Baldoni; Marc Bacher; Nikki Griffin; Kellan Lutz
- Edited by: Ed Marx; Bayard Stryker; Jessica Kehrhahn
- Distributed by: After Dark Films
- Release date: June 10, 2009
- Running time: 87 minutes
- Country: United States
- Language: English
- Budget: $20 million

After Dusk They Come (also known as The Tribe and The Forgotten Ones) is a 2009 American horror/thriller film written and directed by Jorg Ihle and starring Jewel Staite.

== Plot ==
A group of friends are marooned on an uncharted island after their sailboat crashes. They quickly become aware they are not alone, as they find themselves being killed off by a group of ancient humanoid creatures resembling humans and baboons. Liz, the sole survivor after having been captured, flees and is covered in multiple plants' sap as she barrels through the jungle, so when cornered by the Alpha of the pack she realizes the creatures are blind, hunting by smell and sound, which allows her to elude him by standing perfectly still while the plant sap obscures her scent. Later discovering that the creatures raided her friends' camp and stole their only life raft, she covers her entire body in the sap and sneaks into their lair. Setting off all her remaining flares when unable to remain hidden, she makes her escape and is caught by the Alpha in a clearing. Finding a machete left behind by one of the victims from a previous generation, she beheads the Alpha and is allowed to leave by the other creatures who acknowledge her as the new Alpha.

== Cast ==
- Jewel Staite as Liz
- Justin Baldoni as Peter
- Marc Bacher as Ira
- Nikki Griffin as Lauren
- Kellan Lutz as Jake
- Helena Barrett as Maya
- Mohit Ramchandani as Mo
- Rhianna Vigrass as Flashback Voiceover (voice)
- Terry Notary as Alpha Creature

== Remake ==
After the completion of filming, the production crew decided the movie they had produced (then titled The Tribe) did not live up to their original expectations and concluded that it would not do well. The producers proceeded to remake the movie with a new director, script, and cast, under the title The Lost Tribe which was released straight to DVD by Image Entertainment in 2010.
