= Black Spot (Treasure Island) =

Literary device

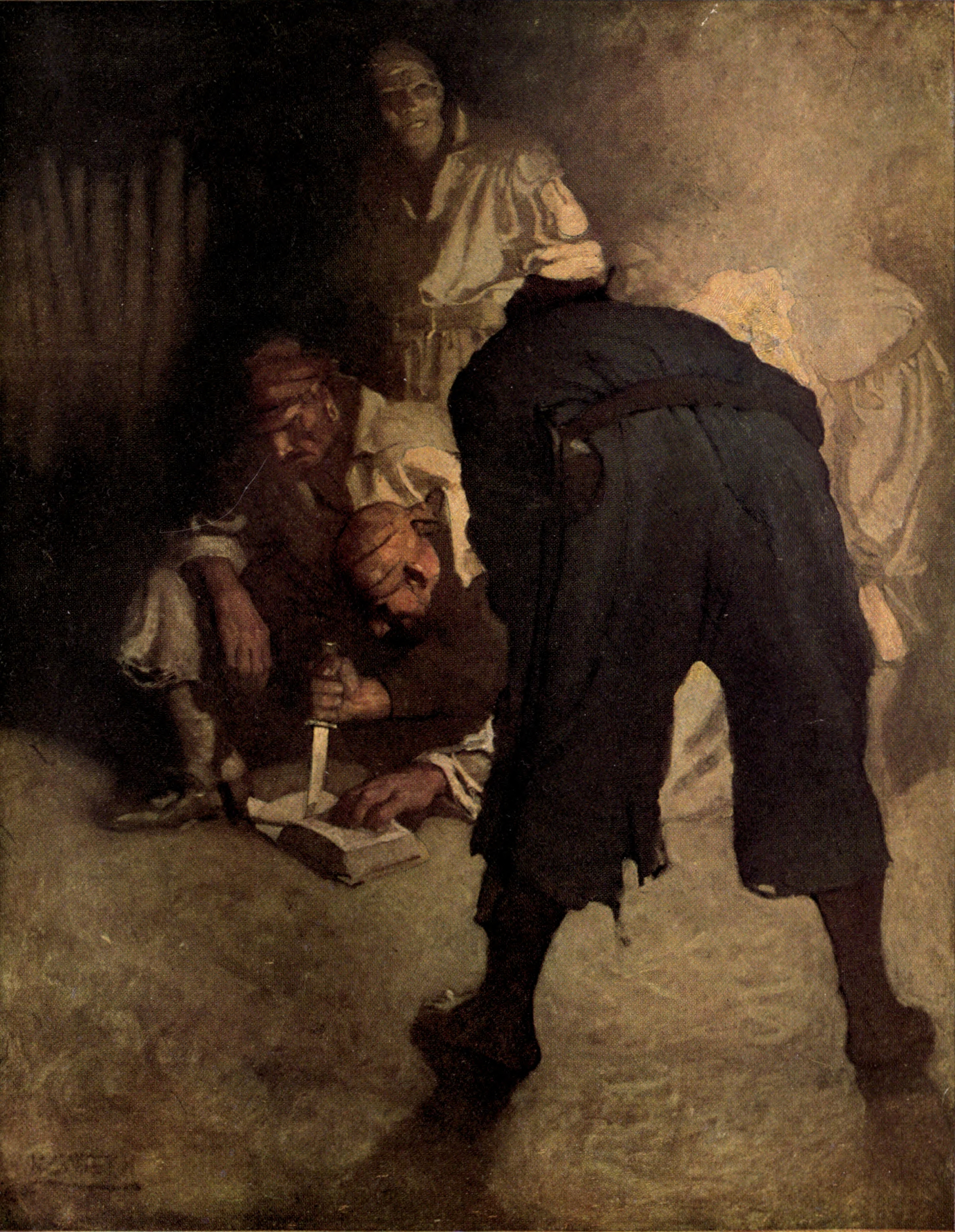
The pirates prepare the Black Spot; N. C. Wyeth, 1911

The Black Spot is a literary device created by Robert Louis Stevenson for his novel Treasure Island (serialized 1881–82, published as a book in 1883). It is a message written on paper or card, signifying the verdict of accused pirates. Depending on the context, it signifies either the recipient’s removal from leadership or a sentence of death at the hands of fellow pirates.

== In Treasure Island ==
In the book, pirates are presented with a "black spot" to officially pronounce a verdict of guilt or judgment. It consists of a circular piece of paper or card, with one side blackened while the other side bears a message and is placed in the hand of the accused. (Note: The fullest description is in chapter 29 of the book, where the narrator describes still having Silver's Black Spot in his possession.) It was a source of much fear because it meant the pirate was to be deposed as leader, by force if necessary—or else killed outright. In Treasure Island, Billy Bones is much frightened by it, yet remains determined to outwit his enemies; however, he suffers a stroke caused by the overconsumption of liquor and dies. Later Long John Silver receives the spot, but is calm enough to notice that the paper bearing the spot has been torn out from a Bible, and warns his associates of the bad luck this will bring upon them.

The words on the back of that black spot were taken from the Biblical Book of Revelation, like an allusion to the mark of the beast and the last judgement, i.e. Chapter 29:

It was around about the size of a crown piece. One side was blank, for it had been the last leaf; the other contained a verse or two of Revelation—these words among the rest, which struck sharply home upon my mind: "Without are dogs and murderers." The printed side had been blackened with wood ash, which already began to come off and soil my fingers; on the blank side had been written with the same material the one word "Depposed".

== Origins ==
The origin of Stevenson's Black Spot might be in the historical tradition of Caribbean pirates of showing an ace of spades to a person condemned as traitor or informer. The card was putting the person dangerously "on the spot", as the ace bears a single pip.

== In other works ==
The Black Spot appears in other works of popular culture, chronologically:

- 1911: In the story "Casting the Runes," by M.R. James, the runes of the title are likened to the black spot because they bring death to the bearer.
- 1930: In the novel Swallows and Amazons the pirate captain Uncle Jim (James Turner, also known as Captain Flint) receives the Black Spot from Nancy, a member of his crew.
- 1933: In the film Gabriel Over the White House displeased racketeer Nick Diamond draws a Black Spot on some notepaper during a meeting with John Bronson, an activist for the unemployed. Bronson says, "I get you, Diamond. But you can't put a million men on the spot."
- 1938: In the film Algiers Regis draws the ace of spades when forced to cut the deck. Carlos calls this drawing of the black spot "very bad luck".
- 1946: In the P. G. Wodehouse novel Joy in the Morning the character Boko Fittleworth commiserates about Stilton Cheesewright, stating "I did think that the black spot had finally passed into Stilton's possession."
- 1948: The Shirley Jackson short story "The Lottery" describes the use of the black spot to select the annual victim of ritual human sacrifice.
- 1964: In the Harlan Ellison short story "Lonelyache" the protagonist Paul has a recurring nightmare in which a different young, good-looking man comes to kill him or "tip him the black spot".
- 1969: In the novel A Pirate Utopia the pirate lord Olaf is given the black spot by Leonard as he had tortured some people without permission.
- 1986: In the Stephen King novel It the doomed "Negro nightclub" is named "The Black Spot".
- 1990: "The Black Spot" is mentioned by a convict at the end of an episode of "The Bill" (series 6, episode 71, "Where There's a Will". in reference to another convict who has been marked to be killed no matter where he is.
- 1996: In the feature film Muppet Treasure Island the black spot is marked on a piece of paper handed to Billy Bones, who calls it "a pirate's death sentence". When Long John Silver is later given a black spot on a Bible page, he swiftly turns the situation to his advantage.
- 2000: The video game Skies of Arcadia presented players with a black spot, a message from a bounty hunter that they would soon be hunted down and killed.
- 2002: Puzzle Pirates, an MMORPG created by Three Rings Design, uses the term "Black Spot" to refer to a temporary way to silence rude and disruptive players.
- 2002: In the animated film Treasure Planet the Black Spot is metaphorically depicted as a black hole that the crew of the R.L.S. Legacy encountered, Mr. Arrow was consumed by it when Scroop cut out his lifeline.
- 2006: In the feature film Pirates of the Caribbean: Dead Man's Chest, Captain Jack Sparrow is presented with a "Black Spot" by Davy Jones as a marker that the Kraken can track; in the film, the black spot appears as a large black boil-like swelling on the palm of his hand.
- 2006: In the Asylum adaptation Pirates of Treasure Island the Black Spot appears as it did in the original novel.
- 2007: In the CBS reality television show Pirate Master the black spot is given by the captain to the three contestants that he nominates to be voted off.
- 2008: The album Red of Tooth and Claw by indie-Americana band Murder By Death includes the song "The Black Spot", with the lyric: "The black spot, I never thought I'd be the one givin' it to you."
- 2009: The pirate-themed power/folk metal band Alestorm featured the Black Spot in their song "Chronicles of Vengeance" on their second album Black Sails at Midnight.
- 2011: "The Curse of the Black Spot", the third episode of Series 6 (Season 32) of Doctor Who, takes place on a pirate ship, and the black spot appears on the palm of anyone sick or injured, causing a supernatural seductress known as The Siren to hunt them down.
- 2011: The Kate Beaton comic collection Hark! A Vagrant has a pirate receive a black spot from another before he is shot for pointing out that Stevenson invented the practice.
- 2012: In "Idiots Are People Three", season 6 episode 3 of the TV series 30 Rock, Jack Donaghy hands Criss (Liz Lemon's new boyfriend) a black spot while telling Liz he is Officially Disapproving of Criss (with no "H" and two "S"). He later presents Criss with a gold star following his marriage to Liz Lemon.
- 2016: In "Chapter XXVIII", 10th episode of the season 3 of the television series Black Sails, Billy Bones uses a black spot to intimidate traitors in Nassau.
- 2016: The naval-themed Tempest expansion to the 4X video game Endless Legend introduces a mechanic that rewards the player for attacking the armies of an empire marked by a Black Spot.
- 2017: In the WIB Optimist Project Akshay Mathur the Black Spot is given to his team to indicate work to be done.
- 2018: The 21st episode of the animated television series Pirates Next Door is titled "The Black Spot", with the plot of the episode being focused on the meaning of the symbol in piracy after Jim got scared when he received a black spot.
- 2018: The JT Music channel of Rooster Teeth released the Sea of Thieves themed rap Booty Bound that refers to a black spot being given to any pirate who fails to find the treasure being searched for.
- 2020: The Journey's End update for the video game Terraria adds an item called The Black Spot, which when used grants the player a rideable flying pirate ship mount.
- 2021: The IPS-N Kidd mech frame (named after famous privateer William Kidd) from the TTRPG Lancer has access to the Blackspot Targeting Laser, a weapon which makes allies more likely to hit any enemy damaged by it. Its flavor text is a Treasure Island quote.
