= Emily Baldoni =

American actress (born 1984)

- Born: Emily Fuxler; 3 August 1984 (age 41); Uppsala, Sweden
- Occupation: Actress
- Years active: 2005–present
- Spouse: Justin Baldoni (m. 2013)
- Children: 2

Emily Baldoni (née Fuxler; born 3 August 1984) is a Swedish actress. She was initially credited as Emily Foxler, a variant spelling of her birth name, before getting married and taking on her husband's surname professionally. She is best known for starring in the 2013 film Coherence.

== Personal life ==
She is married to American actor and director Justin Baldoni, with whom she lives in Nashville, Tennessee. They have a daughter and a son.

== Filmography ==
=== Film ===
| Year | Title | Role | Notes |
|---|---|---|---|
| 2005 | The Elephant's Room | The Girl | Short |
| 2008 | Killer Pad | Lucy | |
| 2008 | Grizzly Park | Bebe | |
| 2009 | Ghosts of Girlfriends Past | Nadja | |
| 2009 | 16 to Life | Tatiana | |
| 2010 | The Lost Tribe | Anna | Straight-to-video |
| 2011 | Identical | Shelly Worth | |
| 2012 | Hidden Moon | Susan | |
| 2013 | Automotive | Lonely | |
| 2013 | Coherence | Emily | |
| 2016 | Criticsized | Clare Donaldson | |
| 2018 | Snapshots | Allison | |
| 2019 | Five Feet Apart | Julie | |
| 2020 | Clouds | CNN Reporter | |
| 2024 | It Ends with Us | Dr. Julie | |

=== Television ===
| Year | Title | Role | Notes |
|---|---|---|---|
| 2007 | CSI: NY | Emma Blackstone | Episode: "One Wedding and a Funeral" |
| 2008 | Burn Notice | Katya | Episode: "Comrades" |
| 2008 | How I Met Your Mother | Claudette | Episode: "Intervention" |
| 2008 | Crash | Kathy | Episode: "One" |
| 2009 | NCIS | Desk Clerk | Episode: "Bounce" |
| 2009 | CSI: Miami | Cynthia Lang | Episode: "Wolfe in Sheep's Clothing" |
| 2009 | Without a Trace | Monica Swall | Episode: "Daylight" |
| 2009 | Hallo Hollywood | Charlotte Westerlund | TV series |
| 2009 | Bones | Lena Brodsky | Episode: "The Bond in the Boot" |
| 2009 | CSI: Crime Scene Investigation | Pam Harris | Episodes: "Coup de Grace", "Death and the Maiden" |
| 2010 | Deadly Honeymoon | Kim | TV film |
| 2010 | Legend of the Seeker | Sister Nicci | Episodes: "Princess", "Bound", "Tears" |
| 2010 | Three Rivers | Jill Hollis | Episode: "Case Histories" |
| 2010 | The Mentalist | Heather Rade | Episode: "Cackle-Bladder Blood" |
| 2011 | Human Target | Julia | Episode: "Marshall Pucci" |
| 2011 | Chaos | Masha Dratchev | Episode: "Love and Rockets" |
| 2011 | Rizzoli & Isles | Sage Molette | Episode: "Bloodlines" |
| 2012 | Rules of Engagement | Stephanie | Episode: "A Big Bust" |
| 2012 | Mad Men | Emily | Episode: "The Phantom" |
| 2012 | Left to Die | Shannon | TV film |
| 2013 | The Glades | Lily Truster (Inna Szabo) | Episode: "Gypsies, Tramps & Thieves" |
| 2013 | Castle | Svetlana Renkov | Episode: "Need to Know" |
| 2013 | Mob City | Claire Harmony | Episode: "His Banana Majesty" |
| 2014 | Agents of S.H.I.E.L.D. | Sofia | Episode: "T.R.A.C.K.S." |
| 2014 | NCIS: Los Angeles | Olivia Brunson | Episode: "Three Hearts" |
| 2014 | Major Crimes | Cynthia | Episode: "Flight Risk" |
| 2014 | Reckless | Nancy Davis | Episodes: "Stand Your Ground", "Blind Sides", "Bloodstone", "51%" |
| 2015, 2019 | Jane the Virgin | Classmate, Runner Friend | Episodes: "Chapter 23", "Chapter 100" |
| 2016 | JustBoobs Sketch | Herself | Episode: "How to Be a Feminist" |
| 2024 | Shatter Belt | Callie | Episode: "The Hard Problem of Carl" |
