= Scarred (film) =

- Directed by: Rosemarie Turko
- Written by: Rose Marie Turko
- Produced by: Rose Marie Turko; Mark Borde; Dan Halperin
- Starring: Jennifer Mayo, Jackie Berryman, David Dean, Rico L. Richardson
- Cinematography: Michael Miner
- Edited by: Miller Drake; Rose Marie Turko
- Release date: July 1984
- Running time: 85 minutes
- Country: United States
- Language: English

Scarred is a 1984 independent film directed by Rose Marie Turko and starring Jennifer Mayo, Jackie Berryman, David Dean, and Rico L. Richardson.

== Plot ==
Shot in a cinéma vérité style, perhaps because this film about teenage prostitution began as a project while director Rose-Marie Turko was a student at UCLA, the format tends to hit home better than a more artificial approach. Although starting out as a story about how young Ruby Star (Jennifer Mayo) was forced into prostitution in order to support herself and her baby, the film quickly dips into the seamier side of life after Ruby meets a pimp nicknamed Easy (David Dean) and gets involved with a demi-monde of degenerates.

== Cast and crew ==
Directed by: Rose Marie Turko

Starring: Jennifer Mayo, Jackie Berryman, David Dean, Rico L. Richardson

== Soundtrack ==
Audio Producers - Ed Stasium, Liam Sterngberg, Mark Goldenberg, Fred Mollin, Dennis Peters.
Recorded in Los Angeles, California at Westlake Studios, Soundcatsle Studio, Davlen Studios, and The Wilcox Studio.

1. "World We Live In" (Freddy Moore) - Boy
2. "Can't Keep a Bad Boy Down" (Freddy Moore) - Boy
3. "Street Life" (Freddy Moore) - The Nu Kats
4. "Money Speaks Japanese" (Freddy Moore) - Boy
5. "Clam Up" (Loretta Grikavicius, Sharon Coker) - The Signals
6. "Message of the Heart" Kim Fields) - Kim Fields
7. "Sign of the Times" (Webb - Read) - The Difference
8. "Adolescent" (The Plugz) - The Plugz
9. "Don't Let Go" (Merlind - Manciouso - Strum - DePompies) - Modern Design
10. "Oasis Of Love" (Kim Fields) - Kim Fields
11. "No Tomorrow Today" (Tim Timmermans ) - Tim Timmermans
12. "World Outside My Window" (Jacobson) - Second Language
