= James Ward Byrkit =

American film director and writer

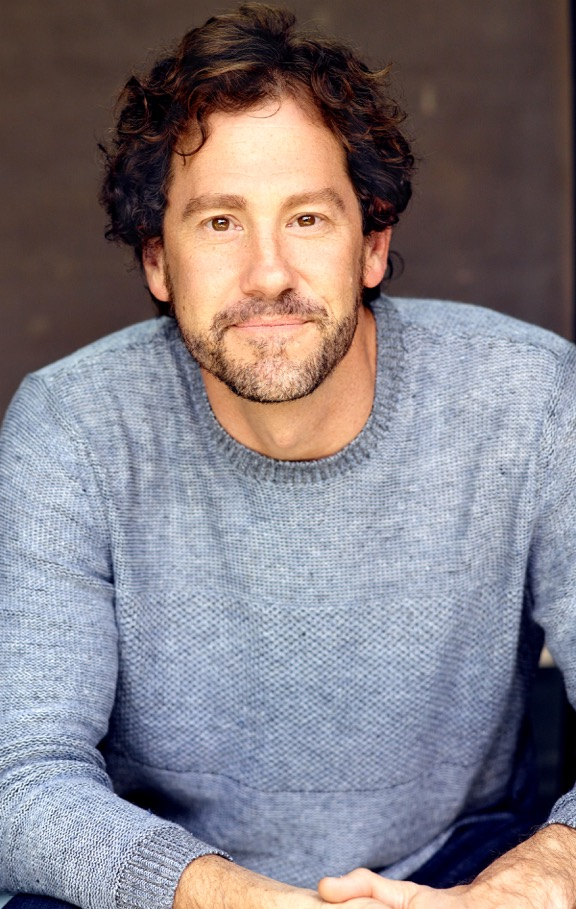
Byrkit in 2016

James Ward Byrkit (also known as James Byrkit or Jim Byrkit) is an American filmmaker. Byrkit is best known for writing and directing the cult science fiction thriller Coherence (2014) and the reality-bending episodic series Shatter Belt (2023). His début feature Coherence earned critical and audience praise and garnered attention for his unconventional approach in the making of the film as "proof that inventive filmmakers can do a lot with a little," identifying him as a groundbreaking talent. Since its release, Coherence consistently appears on "Best of" lists and has been noted for influencing a generation of filmmakers.

== Education ==
Byrkit studied art at Northern Arizona University and earned a Master of Fine Arts in Theatre from California Institute of the Arts. Upon graduating, he designed sets for famed theatre director Jessica Kubzansky while cultivating his storyboarding skills. He won a Garland award in 1998 for his stage design of Kubzansky's production of "The House of Blue Leaves" by John Guare.

== Career ==
Byrkit started his film career as a storyboard artist, working with numerous notable filmmakers, such as Gore Verbinski, Michael Bay, Ben Stiller, Reggie Hudlin, Sacha Baron Cohen, Marc Webb, Edgar Wright, and Zhang Yimou. At the height of this period, Byrkit was one of the most sought-after storyboard artists in Hollywood, working on projects such as the original Pirates of the Caribbean trilogy (2003-2007), The Amazing Spider-Man (2012), Tropic Thunder (2008), and Baby Driver (2017).

Byrkit has a long-time creative collaboration with Verbinski, beginning with Mouse Hunt (1997), The Mexican (2001), and The Ring (2002).

Byrkit was directing commercials when Verbinski called him about Jerry Bruckheimer making a $100 million version of Pirates of the Caribbean ride, which became the first three Pirates of the Caribbean films, where Byrkit's end roll title is art consultant and storyboard artist for Pirates of the Caribbean: The Curse of the Black Pearl (2003) and later expanded his role for Dead Man's Chest (2006) and At World's End (2007), creating props and creature designs. On the very first location scout to the Caribbean, he and Verbinski conceived Jack Sparrow stepping off the sinking boat, the musical introduction to Hector Barbossa's skeleton pirates, and other key moments. Byrkit drew the very first drawing of the Black Pearl and other ships, and inspired the idea for the "sea changed" pirate of Davy Jones and his crew.

In addition to the more than 3,000 storyboards that Byrkit created for the films, he also bounced back and forth between departments, such as production design, props and the pre-visualization team, helping with simplified animatics of the overwhelmingly complex action sequences, and later, for Industrial Light & Magic's visual effects. Byrkit also directed Tales of the Code: Wedlocked (2011), a short film and an immediate prequel to The Curse of the Black Pearl.In the Disney+ series Prop Culture, Byrkit was featured to discuss his work on Pirates of the Caribbean: The Curse of the Black Pearl.

For the Academy Award-winning animated feature Rango (2011), Byrkit designed the lead character of Rango and other main characters, co-wrote the script with Verbinski and John Logan, co-wrote music, and oversaw the storyboard department, in addition to providing the voice of the horned lizard Waffles and six other characters.

Other notable projects continued, including getting tapped to write a draft of the as-yet unproduced remake of When Worlds Collide for Steven Spielberg, and co-producing with David Goyer the horror film The Forest (2016), starring Natalie Dormer.

In stark contrast to these mega-budget projects, Byrkit developed the concept of an ultra-independent metaphysical thriller to be shot on a micro budget over the course of five nights in his own house, without a script or a crew. Coherence went on to win accolades at film festivals all over the world,with remakes produced in China and India. In China, Coherence is included on the Douban list of 250 Top Movies.

In 2024, Byrkit announced plans for a sequel, in partnership with Kate Andrews, producer of It's What's Inside (2024 Sundance Film Festival).

The global popularity of Coherence prompted an interest in creating a live version of the script to be performed on stage. Byrkit's adaptation for the stage was completed in 2026 and it has been produced in theaters in the U.S. and worldwide.

Byrkit's four-part episodic series Shatter Belt was completed in 2022. In the tradition of Twilight Zone and Black Mirror, Shatter Belt is a metaphysical mind bender that premiered at the 2023 South by Southwest Film & TV Festival.

Byrkit is a frequent speaker on the art of movie storytelling at festivals, universities, and corporate events, and teaches his own intensive filmmaking course, ByrkitFilm, over three days in Sedona, Arizona.

Byrkit was a credited concept artist on Verbinski's Good Luck, Have Fun, Don't Die (2025). He executive produced Jenna Kanell's first feature film, De Novo (2026).

== Awards ==
- Director's Award at the 49th Boston Science Fiction Festival for Shatter Belt (2024)
- Audience Favorite Award at Film Club's Lost Weekend for Coherence (2023)
- Best First Feature (nominated) by Indiewire Critics' Poll for Coherence (2014)
- Best Film and Most Innovative Direction at the FANT Bilbao Film Festival (2014)
- Breakthrough Director (nominated) at the Gotham Independent Film Awards 2014
- Next Wave Best Screenplay at the Austin Fantastic Fest for Coherence (2013)
- Maria Award for Best Screenplay at the Sitges Film Festival for Coherence (2013)
- Carnet Jove Jury Award for Best In Competition at the Sitges Film Festival for Coherence (2013)
- Black Tulip Award for Best Feature Debut at the Imagine Film Festival for Coherence (2014)
- Imagine Movie Zone Award, Special Mention at the Imagine Film Festival for Coherence (2014)
- Annie Award for Writing in a Feature Production for Rango (2011, won, shared with John Logan and Gore Verbinski)

== Filmography ==
=== Feature film ===
Year	Title	Director	Writer	Executive Producer	Notes
2011	Rango	No	Story	No	Also voiced "Waffles"
2013	Coherence	Yes	Yes	Yes	

Other credits

Year	Title	Role	Notes
2003	Pirates of the Caribbean: The Curse of the Black Pearl	Consultant	Credited as "Jim Byrkit"
2006	Pirates of the Caribbean: Dead Man's Chest	Conceptual Consultant	
2007	Pirates of the Caribbean: At World's End	Conceptual Consultant	
2011	Pirates of the Caribbean: On Stranger Tides	Uncredited work on the Map	
2016	The Forest	Co-producer	

=== Short film ===
Year	Title	Director	Writer	Producer	Notes
2005	Yes, and...	Yes	Yes	No	
2005	Fractalus	Yes	Yes	Yes	
2011	Pirates of the Caribbean: Tales of the Code: Wedlocked	Yes	No	No	Filmed in late 2006

=== Television ===
Year	Title	Director	Writer	Notes
2001	Stop at Nothing	Yes	No	TV movie
2001	Special Unit 2	Yes	No	Episode "The Rocks"
2023	Shatter Belt	Yes	Yes	4 episodes

As himself

- Prop Culture (2020) (Episode "Pirates of the Caribbean: The Curse of the Black Pearl")

=== Video game ===
Year	Title	Director	Writer	Role	Note
2011	Rango	Yes	Yes	Waffles	
