= National Treasure (franchise) =

Film franchise

- Official franchise logo
- Created by: Jim Kouf; Oren Aviv; Charles Segars
- Original work: National Treasure (2004)
- Owner: The Walt Disney Company
- Years: 2004–present

Print publications
- Books: A Gates Family Mystery: Changing Tides; A Gates Family Mystery: Midnight Ride; A Gates Family Mystery: Uncharted; A Gates Family Mystery: Westward Bound

Films and television
- Films: National Treasure (2004); National Treasure: Book of Secrets (2007)
- Television series: National Treasure: Edge of History (2022–2023)

The National Treasure franchise consists of American historical fiction adventures, including two released theatrical films, a prequel book series, and a television series set 20 years after the films. Future installments, notably a third film, have been under consideration for many years. The plot of the films and books centers around the Gates family – treasure hunters who search for and preserve lost valuables from the history of the United States of America – while the TV series references this background and features some common characters.

The first film was a financial success at the box office. While it was met with mixed reviews by critics, who compared the movie unfavorably to Indiana Jones and The Da Vinci Code, audience response was positive, and the film has gained a positive legacy. The second film was also met with mixed critical reception, and had specific criticism directed at its use of similar plot devices, believability, and pacing. The film was met with positive response from audiences and made significant ticket revenue at the box office, and profit then and from further distribution for The Walt Disney Company.

The television series for Disney+ was developed in the 2020s, releasing globally in mid-December 2022, while a third film has been under discussion for more than ten years.

== Films ==
=== National Treasure (2004) ===
Benjamin "Ben" Franklin Gates is a member of a family of treasure hunters. At a young age, his grandfather tells him the legend of the hidden treasures of the Founding Fathers of the USA. His grandfather teaches him that the men and women of American history buried the treasure somewhere within the country and have hidden highly cryptic clues throughout various lands within the nation's borders.

Years later, after a dead-end in the family's momentum of discovery and generations of failed attempts to progress the research, the Gates family has publicly acquired a reputation of conspiracy theorists who profess myth. Ben, however, believes he has found a new lead to solve the mystery of the treasure, which will allow him to prove that his family's legacy isn't a joke. One of the clues lead him to believe a map is on the back of the Declaration of Independence. In a race to find the historical discovery and to preserve it in a national museum, Ben must outpace the villainous plans of his former associate-turned-enemy named Ian Howe. Meanwhile, the FBI grows suspicious of his actions. Upon learning that Ian intends to take the document and find the treasure for personal gain, Ben decides to steal the file himself in order to preserve it, as well as the national treasure.

In this head-to-head to save history, Ben is accompanied by his close friend Riley Poole and Dr. Abigail Chase.

=== National Treasure: Book of Secrets (2007) ===
Several years since Benjamin "Ben" Franklin Gates found the Knight's Templar national treasure and gained fame and wealth from a self-imposed minimal 1% finder's fee, the Gates family finds themselves once again defending their family name.

Competing scavenger Mitch Wilkinson claims that he has learned from a fragment of a missing page of John Wilkes Booth's diary, that the Gates family ancestor was a conspirator to the assassination of President Abraham Lincoln in 1865. Together the Gates family contends with Wilkinson, who also states that hints to the whereabouts of the Lost City of Gold were found in the journal. Outraged by his familial claims Ben, his ex-girlfriend Abigail, and his best friend Riley (who has become a famous writer), travel the globe to France, England, and Washington, D.C., where their plans escalate. Along the way the team collect clues to redeem the family name, and to prove his honor.

In D.C., Ben must kidnap the President in order to keep him safe from Wilkinson, and to look within the fabled President's Secret Book to solve the mystery.

=== Future ===
In May 2008, director and producer Jon Turteltaub stated that the filmmakers involved with the series will take their time in developing another National Treasure sequel. By September 2008, producer Jerry Bruckheimer officially confirmed that a third film is under development, with a script being written that November. In May 2010, Bruckheimer stated that the first draft of the screenplay was completed. In May 2016, Nicolas Cage confirmed the film was still undergoing rewrites and fact-checking their historical accuracy during the process of being developed. In September 2017, Bruckheimer revealed that a script was completed, but Disney was not satisfied with the story. By July 2018, Turtletaub reiterated that a script was "close", but that Disney was still not on board with the story.

In January 2020, after years of being in development hell, a third film was officially in development with Chris Bremner hired to write a new script. In May, Bruckheimer stated that the intent is for all of the original cast from the previous films reprise their respective roles. By March 2022, Nicolas Cage stated that he has not yet seen the script, casting doubt on the realization of a third film. In April of the same year, the actor indicated that the film had been delayed with The Walt Disney Company favoring the television series instead. In August 2022, Bruckheimer stated that the script had been finished and was being sent to Cage for approval.

In March 2024, following the release of the Disney+ TV series National Treasure: Edge of History, Cage stated he had no interest in returning for a third film. However, in an interview with National Treasure Hunt podcast (May 29), director Jon Turteltaub stated the movie was "100% going ahead with the original cast, with potential for previous adversaries to return". By May of the same year, Jerry Bruckheimer confirmed that Ted Elliott, who was previously writing a Pirates of the Caribbean 6 script, was the writer of National Treasure 3. Ted Elliot later revealed to the National Treasure Hunt podcast that he has been working on the project, completed his first draft of the script with "familiar faces" in the story, and that the TV series National Treasure: Edge of History is also being treated as canon.

In October 2025, Bruckheimer stated that the script was nearing completion while acknowledging that Cage is slated to reprise his role.

In August 2026, Turtletaub announced National Treasure 3 would be happening, at a live event taping of the National Treasure Hunt podcast.

Film	U.S. release date	Director	Screenwriter(s)	Story by	Producer(s)
National Treasure	November 19, 2004	Jon Turteltaub	Jim Kouf, Cormac & Marianne Wibberley	Jim Kouf, Oren Aviv & Charles Segars	Jon Turteltaub & Jerry Bruckheimer
National Treasure: Book of Secrets	December 21, 2007	Jon Turteltaub	Cormac & Marianne Wibberley	Ted Elliott, Terry Rossio, Gregory Poirier, Cormac & Marianne Wibberley	Jon Turteltaub & Jerry Bruckheimer

== Television ==
Series	Season	Episodes	Originally released			Showrunner(s)
Series	Season	Episodes	First released	Last released	Network	Showrunner(s)
National Treasure: Edge of History	1	10	December 14, 2022	February 8, 2023	Disney+	Cormac Wibberley & Marianne Wibberley

=== National Treasure: Edge of History (2022–2023) ===
In May 2020, Jerry Bruckheimer announced that a Disney+ exclusive streaming services television series was in development. The series would feature a younger cast, with the pilot episode scripted and the additional episodes outlined. By March 2021, the series was green-lit with a 10-episode order from The Walt Disney Company. Co-written by Marianne and Cormac Wibberley, the pilot episode would be directed by Mira Nair.

The series follows a Hispanic Latina-American lead character named Jess Valenzuela, who is a 20-year-old DREAMer who sets off on an exploration to discover the mystery of her family history, and with the help of her friends seeks to recover historical lost treasure. The co-writers additionally serve as creators, and executive producers, on the series, while Jerry Bruckheimer also serves as a producer. The project is a joint-venture production between Jerry Bruckheimer Television and ABC Signature.

In October 2021, Lisette Olivera was cast to play Jess (Morales in original notes, Valenzuela in released material) in the show. In January 2022, Lyndon Smith, Zuri Reed, Jake Austin Walker, Antonio Cipriano, and Jordan Rodrigues were announced to have been cast as FBI Agent Ross, Tasha, Liam, Oren, and Ethan, respectively. In February 2022, Catherine Zeta-Jones was announced to have been cast as antagonist Billie Pearce. In April 2022, it was announced that Justin Bartha would reprise his role of Riley Poole as a recurring guest star. In September 2022, the showrunners/creators stated that they have tentative plans for reintroducing additional characters from the films into the series, including Nicolas Cage's Ben Gates. The duo compared the meeting between Valenzuela and Gates to Tony Stark / Iron Man and Peter Parker / Spider-Man in the Marvel Cinematic Universe.

National Treasure: Edge of History premiered on December 14, 2022, on Disney+.

On April 21, 2023, the series was canceled after one season.

== Main cast and characters ==
Key
- A dark gray cell indicates the character was not in the film.
- A ^{Y} indicates an actor or actress portrayed a younger version of their character.

Character	Film		Television
Character	National Treasure	National Treasure: Book of Secrets	National Treasure: Edge of History
Character	2004	2007	2022
Principal cast
Benjamin "Ben" Franklin Gates	Nicolas Cage Hunter Gomez^{Y}	Nicolas Cage	
Riley Poole	Justin Bartha	Justin Bartha	Justin Bartha
Dr. Abigail Chase	Diane Kruger	Diane Kruger	
Patrick Henry Gates	Jon Voight	Jon Voight	
Agent Peter Sadusky	Harvey Keitel	Harvey Keitel	Harvey Keitel
Ian Howe	Sean Bean		
Dr. Emily Appleton-Gates		Helen Mirren	
Mitch Wilkinson		Ed Harris	
Jess Valenzuela			Lisette Olivera
Tasha			Zuri Reed
Oren			Antonio Cipriano
Billie Pearce			Catherine Zeta-Jones
Ethan			Jordan Rodrigues
Liam			Jake Austin Walker
Agent Ross			Lyndon Smith
Supporting cast
John Adams Gates	Christopher Plummer		
Thomas Gates	Jason Earles	Joel Gretsch	
Charles Carroll Gates		Billy Unger	
John Wilkes Booth		Christian Camargo	
President of the United States		Bruce Greenwood	
Agent Hendricks	Armando Riesco	Armando Riesco	Armando Riesco

- Benjamin Franklin "Ben" Gates (portrayed by Nicolas Cage) – Benjamin Gates is the protagonist of the films. Ben has heard stories about the Templar Treasure from his grandfather ever since he was a young child, and decides to hunt for it himself. Along with Ian Howe and Riley Poole, Ben discovers the Charlotte, which leads him to the next clue in the treasure hunt. After being betrayed by Ian, he sets out against him to steal the Declaration of Independence. As the search progresses, Ben meets and eventually falls in love with Abigail Chase. He argues with his father who doesn't believe in the treasure, after 20 thankless years of seeking it himself. However, Ben is successful in discovering the treasure. In National Treasure: Book of Secrets, his family name is threatened by Mitch Wilkinson, and he finds himself hunting for the legendary Seven Cities of Gold. He and Abigail have broken up, but are reunited during the treasure hunt. During this journey, Ben has to kidnap the President of the United States (Bruce Greenwood) to find a clue in the President's Book of Secrets. Ben is skilled at code-breaking, and has degrees in American history (from Georgetown University) and mechanical engineering (from MIT) as well as being an ROTC-commissioned Navy diving officer. Ben is portrayed by Hunter Gomez in the beginning of the first film.
- Riley Poole (portrayed by Justin Bartha) – Riley Poole is the best friend of Ben Gates, and co-finder of both the Templar Treasure and the City of Gold. Ben and his financier Ian Howe find Riley working in a cubicle. He comes along on the journey to find the Charlotte, using his computer expertise to assist his friends. He writes a book about the Templar Treasure and other myths, and this book becomes a key to helping find the City of Gold in the second film. He begins having financial trouble in the second movie, and his Ferrari is impounded by the IRS for parking in a tow-away zone while he is autographing copies of his book at Border's. However, his car is returned to him after the discovery of the City of Gold. In both films he is portrayed as the comic relief of the group, and regularly replies with sarcastic jokes. He is very excited when he finally knows something Ben doesn't.
- Abigail Chase (portrayed by Diane Kruger) – Abigail Chase is a German American employee at the National Archives in Washington, D.C., and the girlfriend of Benjamin Gates. The two meet during Ben's hunt for the Templar Treasure, when Ben comes to warn the Archives of Ian Howe's plan to steal the Declaration of Independence. When Abigail is brought into the hunt, she is at first against helping, attempting to escape with the Declaration. However, she begins to trust Ben, and the two quickly fall in love. She plays a large role in finding the treasure, and at the end of the first film she and Ben have moved in together. In the beginning of the second film, she and Ben have broken up, and she is dating Connor, a curator at the White House. She is out on a date with Connor when Ben attempts to steal her ID Pass for the Library of Congress to view a page from the diary of John Wilkes Booth. She and Ben argue, but when she learns of Ben's mission to find the Lost City of Gold, she decides to rejoin him and Riley in the treasure hunting. They begin to make up over the course of the film, and are soon a couple again.
- Patrick Henry Gates (portrayed by Jon Voight) – Patrick Henry Gates is the father of Benjamin Gates, named for Patrick Henry. He doesn't believe in the treasures at first, thinking that the clues will just lead to other clues, not the treasure at all. It is revealed that he searched for the treasure himself for 20 years and never found it, so he came to believe that the treasure was a hoax. He thinks it's a waste of time to search for the treasure and he is dismayed when he discovers that Ben stole the Declaration of Independence. He is taken hostage by Ian and is present when they discover the treasure. In Book of Secrets, Patrick is angered by Mitch Wilkinson when he comes forward with a Booth diary page that seems to show that Thomas Gates was involved in the death of President Lincoln. He then becomes discouraged by the fact that they have no "proof" that Wilkinson is lying. When Ben and Riley are in London, Patrick is attacked by the Wilkinsons, who clone his cell phone to get access to Ben's progress. In this film, Patrick is reunited with his ex-wife, Emily Appleton. The two have to team up to save their son, and it appears that they are back together by the film's end. The two met on a treasure hunt of their own and the treasure hunt for Cibola seems to cause them to remember their love for each other and finally reconcile. Patrick is named as one of the co-finders of the City of Gold.
- Agent Peter Sadusky (portrayed by Harvey Keitel) – Agent Peter Sadusky is an FBI agent (presumably of high rank) who first meets the treasure-hunters when he is assigned to the case after the Declaration of Independence is stolen. He looks for Ben throughout the night before finally finding him and taking him into custody in Philadelphia. Ben escapes him in New York, but Sadusky returns to retrieve the Declaration. He seems to not believe the story of the treasure at first, but actually seems to know it quite well, when it is shown that he is a Freemason. Sadusky arrests Ian Howe at the end of the film. In Book of Secrets, he is introduced when some of his agents come forth with a newspaper article about the Booth diary page. He is suspicious of Wilkinson, and begins to put the pieces together. Later, he is hot on Ben's trail again when Ben "kidnaps" the President of the United States. He also shows he knows more than he lets on about things: he confirms the Book of Secrets' existence to Ben, but claims not to know its location. After learning that Ben kidnapped the President, he apparently guesses what it was for and heads straight to the Library of Congress, revealing that he somehow apparently knew the location all along. He follows him to Mount Rushmore, only to lose him until after the discovery of Cibola.
- Ian Howe (portrayed by Sean Bean) – Ian Howe is Ben's ex-partner and ex-financier, and the main antagonist in the first film. He comes along with Ben and Riley to the Arctic to search for the Charlotte. Ian and Ben have a brief face-off, after Ian becomes disappointed that Ben doesn't want to help steal and run chemical tests on the Declaration of Independence with him, and the faceoff ends with the ship exploding. Ian and one of accompanying men escape the ship before the explosion, and, probably assuming Ben and Riley are dead, drive off. The night of the 70th anniversary gala at the National Archives, Ian and his men break in, only to find that Ben has beaten them to the Declaration (Ben stole it to protect it from Ian, fearing that Ian would not treat it with respect and may even destroy the document). Ian and his men then follow him out of the building and a car chase ensues. Ian then goes to Philadelphia, where he chases Abigail and Riley and ends up stealing the Declaration from them. After Ben is arrested by the FBI, Ian ends up helping him escape from custody, and then meets him at Trinity Church in New York City where it is revealed that Ian had his men abduct Patrick so that Ben can take him beneath the church. He follows Ben down into the tunnels beneath the church, where one of his men dies after falling through the rotting floorboards. The group ends up at a dead end, and Patrick gives Ian a false clue hinting that the treasure is in the Old North Church in Boston. Ian abandons the others, who soon find the treasure and inform the FBI of their bluff to Ian, who, along with his remaining men, are apprehended in Boston while attempting to break into the church and charged with kidnapping, attempted murder, and trespassing on government properties.
- Mitch Wilkinson (portrayed by Ed Harris) – Mitch Wilkinson is the main antagonist of the second film. Wilkinson first appears when Ben and Patrick are giving a speech, showing a page from the diary of John Wilkes Booth, which has the name Thomas Gates written on it. He says he believes it means that Gates was a conspirator in the Lincoln assassination. Wilkinson is a direct descendant of the Confederate General (and Freemason) Albert Pike and has a letter from the Queen to Pike that gives a clue to Cibola. Wilkinson and his brothers keep close tabs on Ben and his friends as they search for the clues. He overhears Ben mentioning the Statue of Liberty to Abigail in a phone conversation, and ends up going to New York City, only to find that it's the wrong statue. Before this, though, Mitch and his brothers break into Patrick's home and clone his cell phone, using this advantage to keep track of Ben and listen in on his conversations with his father. He and his two brothers follow the treasure hunters to London, where he chases them and obtains the plank from the Resolute desk at Buckingham Palace. Wilkinson then returns to the United States, where he learns that Ben's mother, Emily, is able to translate the Native American planks. He goes to her and then kidnaps her after she translates the plank, taking her to Mount Rushmore, where they meet with the rest of the group. They all venture into the caves below the mountain, and Wilkinson threatens to kill people to keep them going. His true motives are revealed: he wanted his family to finally gain some fame for discovering something and smeared Thomas Gates' name to get Ben involved in the treasure hunt, although he would later apologize to Ben after they found the City of Gold and when Thomas Gates's innocence is proven. Eventually, as a cave is filling with water, Mitch allows Ben and the others to escape and drowns in the flooded City of Gold. Initially he forced Ben to stay behind so he could live, but he stays instead and his last request is that Ben give him credit for the discovery. Despite having died, Mitch is given partial credit for the discovery of the treasure at Ben's insistence.
- Emily Appleton-Gates (portrayed by Helen Mirren) – Emily Appleton-Gates is the British mother of Ben Gates and ex-wife of Patrick. She is a professor at the University of Maryland, and she has an extensive knowledge of Native American history. She is, however, extremely unpopular amongst her students. She met Patrick during a treasure hunt, but a traveling incident caused them to break up and not speak for 32 years. When Patrick arrives, she is less than pleased to see him. She translates the plank that Ben and his friends find at Buckingham Palace, which leads them to find the other half of the plank. Patrick is sent to have her translate it, though Mitch Wilkinson gets to her first, forcing her to lie to Patrick before she is kidnapped. Patrick tries to clear the air a bit between them, but she blows him off to protect him, although she slips in a clue about what's really going on that he and Ben decipher. At Mount Rushmore, she and Patrick are separated from the others in the cave, and it begins to be apparent that Patrick and Emily have fallen in love again.
- Thomas Gates (portrayed by Jason Earles in the first film, Joel Gretsch in the second film) – Thomas Gates is the father of Charles Carroll Gates. Thomas appeared in both films. Thomas lived around Washington, D.C. In 1832, Charles Carroll told Thomas the story of the Templar Treasure and gave him the last remaining clue to finding it: "the secret lies with Charlotte." In 1848, Thomas was still trying to figure out the clue that had been given to him. At this time, his brother James follows a series of letters their aunt sent to their father, believing it leads to a treasure bigger than the gold of California. Thomas became known for his ability to solve puzzles. Just five days after the end of the Civil War, he is confronted by John Wilkes Booth and another member of the K.G.C. They present to him a cipher, and he immediately begins to decode it. Booth leaves and proceeds with his plans to assassinate Lincoln. Soon after, Thomas soon learns that the men who approached him were members of the K.G.C., and he stops decoding the cipher. The man takes a gun out and urges him to continue deciphering the code. Suddenly, news of Lincoln's assassination is heard and the people in the bar are forced to exit. The man continues to urge Thomas to finish deciphering the code. When the man is distracted by the sound of a window breaking, Thomas rips out the page containing the cipher and throws it into the fireplace, trying to burn it. The man, realizing what had happened, shoots Thomas and retrieves what remains of the page and then escapes. Thomas is left dying there, with his son Charles. His last words to Charles are "the debt that all men pay..."
- John Adams Gates (portrayed by Christopher Plummer in the first film) – John Adams Gates is Patrick's father. He is the one who explains the treasure to his grandson Ben.
- Charles Carroll Gates – Charles Carroll Gates is the son of Thomas Gates. He witnessed his father's murder on April 14, 1865, and recounted the story to his grandson, Patrick Gates, who used this information to help figure out the location of a treasure. Charles is the main character in the novel, Forever Free, where he befriends a freed slave.
- Adam Benjamin Gates – Adam Benjamin Gates is the son of John Raleigh Gates. He, along with his sister Rebecca, are the main characters in the novel, Westward Bound, which takes place in 1803.
- John Raleigh Gates – John Raleigh Gates is the main character in the novel, Midnight Ride. He lived during the time of the American Revolution.

== Additional crew and production details ==
Film	Crew/Detail					
Film	Composer	Cinematographer(s)	Editor(s)	Production companies	Distributing company	Running time
National Treasure	Trevor Rabin	Caleb Deschanel	William Goldenberg	Walt Disney Pictures, Saturn Films, Junction Entertainment, Jerry Bruckheimer Films	Buena Vista Pictures	131 minutes
National Treasure: Book of Secrets	Trevor Rabin	Amir Mokri & John Schwartzman	David Rennie & William Goldenberg	Walt Disney Pictures, Saturn Films, NT2 Productions, Junction Entertainment, Sparkler Entertainment, Jerry Bruckheimer Films	Walt Disney Studios Motion Pictures	124 minutes

== Literature & other media ==
=== Novelization ===
Though a literature adaptation was never released for the first film, a novelization of the second titled National Treasure 2: Book of Secrets – The Junior Novel was released on November 6, 2007. Parts of the story in the novel version differ slightly from what was actually filmed, owing to changes being made in the screenplay prior to and during production.

=== Book series ===
The franchise expanded with the release of a series of historical-fiction novels, written by Catherine Hapka and published by Disney Press. The series centers around the ancestors of the Gates Family.

#	Title	Released	Time period	Plot summary
1	National Treasure: Changing Tides - A Gates Family Mystery	November 6, 2007	1612	The epilogue from Changing Tides is included at the back of the National Treasure book. Samuel Gates and his brother, William, travel to the Americas and the newly organized Jamestown, hoping to find a fortune and rescue their family name.
2	National Treasure: Midnight Ride - A Gates Family Mystery	March 8, 2008	1773–1775	At the onset of the Revolutionary War in Boston in 1775, John Raleigh Gates follows the clues to find an incredible treasure.
3	National Treasure: Uncharted - A Gates Family Mystery	August 26, 2008	1803	After the American Revolutionary War, Adam Benjamin Gates and his twin sister, Eleanor or Ellie, have heard their father's tales of his part in the Revolutionary War and his discovery of a great treasure that helped the Patriots. Soon, Adam and Ellie find themselves on a dangerous journey into uncharted lands in search of a treasure hidden deep within the wilderness.
4	National Treasure: Westward Bound - A Gates Family Mystery	December 23, 2008	1848–1849	Thomas Gates is convinced that the treasure is located with someone or in something called the "Charlotte". However, his youngest brother James Monroe Gates wants a treasure that is easier to get to. In 1848, while helping a friend on the run from her father, he reluctantly follows a series of letters his aunt, Eleanor, sent to his father, believing it leads to a treasure that is bigger than the gold of California.
5	National Treasure: Forever Free - A Gates Family Mystery	—N/a (Note: Note: Though it was scheduled to be released on April 28, 2009, it was never released to the public and is not available for reading.)	1872	After the death of his father, Charles Gates considers running away from his family's past of treasure hunting. However, when he befriends a freed slave named Daniel, they set off to uncover what civil rights leaders fought to protect.
6	National Treasure: Roaring In - A Gates Family Mystery	—N/a (Note: Note: Though it was scheduled to be released on August 25, 2009, it was never released to the public and is not available for reading.)	1920s	Jay Gates wishes to remain in peace and quiet, despite the economic boom of the 1920s. However, he soon learns of hints in regards to the Charlotte, for which his family had been searching for almost a century, and decides to seek adventure.

=== Podcast ===
The franchise also has an unofficial podcast, National Treasure Hunt, hosted by Aubrey Paris Ph.D. and Emily Black Ph.D., who break down the franchise with in depth analysis into the science and myths around the National Treasure universe as well as comparisons with other similar franchises, Tomb Raider, Indiana Jones and Uncharted. The podcast hosts interviews with prominent people within the franchise including Jon Turteltaub, Cormac & Marianne Wibberley and Charles Segars, as well as Red Carpet interviews with the stars of National Treasure: Edge of History which include Catherine Zeta-Jones, Breeda Wool and Lisette Olivera.

The podcast hosts a stage tour, special events and meet and greets for its fanbase around the locations of the film. The podcast also spawned a book, National Treasure: One Step Short of Crazy.

== Reception ==
=== Box office and financial performance ===
Film	Box office gross			Box office ranking		Video sales gross	Worldwide total gross income	Budget	Ref.
Film	North America	Other territories	Worldwide	All time North America	All time worldwide	North America	Worldwide total gross income	Budget	Ref.
National Treasure	$173,008,894	$174,503,424	$347,512,318	#290	#577	$5,538,549	$353,050,867	$100,000,000	
National Treasure: Book of Secrets	$219,964,115	$239,278,134	$459,242,249	#168	#337	$105,814,403	$565,056,662	$130,000,000	
Totals	$392,973,009	$413,781,558	$806,754,567	x̄ #229 (Note: This figure based on an average calculation, of all the all-time box office rankings provided.)	x̄ #457 (Note: This figure based on an average calculation, of all the all-time box office rankings provided.)	$111,352,952	$918,107,519	230,000,000	

=== Critical and public response ===
Media	Rotten Tomatoes	Metacritic	CinemaScore
National Treasure	46% (179 reviews)	40/100 (36 reviews)	A-
National Treasure: Book of Secrets	36% (130 reviews)	48/100 (26 reviews)	A-
National Treasure: Edge of History Season 1	38% (21 reviews)	46/100 (10 reviews)	—N/a

Both movies received mixed reviews from critics but positive reactions from audiences, leading to a cult following. The television series was also met with mixed reviews.

=== Accolades ===
The following is a table listing the awards and nominations received by National Treasure and National Treasure: Book of Secrets.

Year	Award	Category	Notes	Result
National Treasure
2005	BMI Film & TV Awards	BMI Film Music Award	BMI Film Music Award for Trevor Rabin	Won
2005	Academy of Science Fiction, Fantasy & Horror Films, USA	Saturn Award for Best Action/Adventure/Thriller Film		Nominated
2005	Academy of Science Fiction, Fantasy & Horror Films, USA	Saturn Award for Best Supporting Actress	Diane Kruger	Nominated
2005	Teen Choice Awards	Movie: Action/Adventure		Nominated
2005	Visual Effects Society Awards	Outstanding Models and Miniatures in a Motion Picture	Scott Beverly, Forest Fischer, Matthew Gratzner & Leigh-Alexandra Jacob, for the treasure room	Nominated
2005	World Stunt Awards	Taurus Award for Best Overall Stunt by a Stunt Woman	Lisa Hoyle	Nominated
2005	Young Artist Awards	Best Family Feature Film: Drama		Nominated
2005	Young Artist Awards	Best Performance in a Feature Film, Supporting Young Actor	Hunter Gomez	Nominated
National Treasure: Book of Secrets
2007	Academy of Science Fiction, Horror and Fantasy Film	Best Supporting Actress	Helen Mirren	Nominated
2008	Golden Trailer Awards	Best Motion/Title Graphics		Nominated
2008	MTV Movie Awards	Best Movie		Nominated
2008	Razzie Awards	Worst Actor	Nicolas Cage	Nominated
2008	Razzie Awards	Worst Supporting Actor	Jon Voight	Nominated
2008	Teen Choice Awards	Choice Movie Actress: Action Adventure	Diane Kruger	Nominated
