= List of 2004 box office number-one films in Canada =

This is a list of films which have placed number one at the weekend box office in Canada during 2004.

== Weekend gross list ==
| † | This implies the highest-grossing movie of the year. |

| # | Weekend End Date | Film | Weekend Gross (millions) | Notes |
|---|---|---|---|---|
| 1 | January 4, 2004 | The Lord of the Rings: The Return of the King | $4.38 | |
| 2 | January 11, 2004 | The Lord of the Rings: The Return of the King | $2.32 | |
| 3 | January 18, 2004 | Along Came Polly | $2.31 | |
| 4 | January 25, 2004 | The Butterfly Effect | $1.48 | |
| 5 | February 1, 2004 | The Butterfly Effect | $1.12 | You Got Served was #1 in America. |
| 6 | February 8, 2004 | The Butterfly Effect | $0.98 | Barbershop 2: Back in Business was #1 in America. |
| 7 | February 15, 2004 | 50 First Dates | $4.18 | |
| 8 | February 20, 2004 | 50 First Dates | $2.13 | |
| 9 | February 29, 2004 | The Passion of the Christ | $4.27 | |
| 10 | March 7, 2004 | The Passion of the Christ | $2.87 | |
| 11 | March 14, 2004 | The Passion of the Christ | $1.87 | |
| 12 | March 21, 2004 | Dawn of the Dead | $1.82 | |
| 13 | March 28, 2004 | Scooby-Doo 2: Monsters Unleashed | $2.23 | |
| 14 | April 4, 2004 | Hellboy | $2.14 | |
| 15 | April 11, 2004 | Hellboy | $1.13 | The Passion of the Christ was #1 in America. |
| 16 | April 18, 2004 | Kill Bill: Volume 2 | $2.74 | |
| 17 | April 25, 2004 | 13 Going on 30 | $1.78 | Man on Fire was #1 in America. |
| 18 | May 2, 2004 | Mean Girls | $2.16 | |
| 19 | May 9, 2004 | Van Helsing | $3.81 | |
| 20 | May 16, 2004 | Troy | $5.21 | |
| 21 | May 23, 2004 | Shrek 2 † | $9.78 | Shrek 2 had the highest weekend debut of 2004. |
| 22 | May 30, 2004 | Shrek 2 † | $5.93 | |
| 23 | June 6, 2004 | Harry Potter and the Prisoner of Azkaban | $8.58 | |
| 24 | June 13, 2004 | Harry Potter and the Prisoner of Azkaban | $4.19 | |
| 25 | June 20, 2004 | Harry Potter and the Prisoner of Azkaban | $2.21 | DodgeBall: A True Underdog Story was #1 in America. |
| 26 | June 27, 2004 | Fahrenheit 9/11 | $2.52 | |
| 27 | July 4, 2004 | Spider-Man 2 | $8.81 | |
| 28 | July 11, 2004 | Spider-Man 2 | $3.85 | |
| 29 | July 18, 2004 | I, Robot | $2.57 | |
| 30 | July 25, 2004 | The Bourne Supremacy | $4.35 | |
| 31 | August 1, 2004 | The Village | $2.94 | |
| 32 | August 8, 2004 | Collateral | $2.21 | |
| 33 | August 15, 2004 | Alien vs. Predator | $2.85 | |
| 34 | August 22, 2004 | Exorcist: The Beginning | $1.04 | |
| 35 | August 29, 2004 | Hero | $2.09 | |
| 36 | September 5, 2004 | Hero | $1.42 | |
| 37 | September 12, 2004 | Resident Evil: Apocalypse | $2.25 | |
| 38 | September 19, 2004 | Sky Captain and the World of Tomorrow | $1.21 | |
| 39 | September 26, 2004 | The Forgotten | $2.05 | |
| 40 | October 3, 2004 | Shark Tale | $2.78 | |
| 41 | October 10, 2004 | Shark Tale | $2.38 | |
| 42 | October 17, 2004 | Shark Tale | $1.94 | |
| 43 | October 24, 2004 | The Grudge | $3.23 | |
| 44 | October 31, 2004 | The Grudge | $2.18 | |
| 45 | November 7, 2004 | The Incredibles | $4.19 | |
| 46 | November 14, 2004 | The Incredibles | $3.57 | |
| 47 | November 21, 2004 | The SpongeBob SquarePants Movie | $2.53 | National Treasure was #1 in America. |
| 48 | November 28, 2004 | Alexander | $1.49 | National Treasure was #1 in America. |
| 49 | December 5, 2004 | National Treasure | $1.14 | National Treasure reached #1 in its third weekend of release. |
| 50 | December 12, 2004 | Ocean's Twelve | $3.19 | |
| 51 | December 19, 2004 | Ocean's Twelve | $1.84 | Lemony Snicket's A Series of Unfortunate Events was #1 in America. |
| 52 | December 26, 2004 | Meet the Fockers | $2.43 | |

== See also ==
- List of Canadian films
