= Segars =

Segars is a surname. Notable people with the surname include:

- Charles Segars (born 1963), Media and Communications executive, National Security consultant, and a Producer/Writer
- Simon Segars (born 1967), former chief executive officer of ARM Holdings plc
