= National Treasure: Book of Secrets =

2007 film by Jon Turteltaub

- Theatrical release poster
- Directed by: Jon Turteltaub
- Screenplay by: Cormac Wibberley; Marianne Wibberley
- Story by: Gregory Poirier; Cormac Wibberley; Marianne Wibberley; Ted Elliott; Terry Rossio
- Based on: Characters by Jim Kouf; Oren Aviv; Charles Segars
- Produced by: Jerry Bruckheimer; Jon Turteltaub
- Starring: Nicolas Cage; Jon Voight; Harvey Keitel; Ed Harris; Diane Kruger; Justin Bartha; Bruce Greenwood; Helen Mirren
- Cinematography: John Schwartzman; Amir Mokri
- Edited by: William Goldenberg; David Rennie
- Music by: Trevor Rabin
- Production companies: Walt Disney Pictures; Jerry Bruckheimer Films; Junction Entertainment; Saturn Films
- Distributed by: Walt Disney Studios Motion Pictures
- Release dates: December 13, 2007 (New York City); December 21, 2007 (United States)
- Running time: 124 minutes
- Country: United States
- Language: English
- Budget: $130 million
- Box office: $459 million

National Treasure: Book of Secrets is a 2007 American action-adventure film directed by Jon Turteltaub and produced by Jerry Bruckheimer. It is a sequel to the 2004 film National Treasure and is the second film of the National Treasure franchise. The film stars Nicolas Cage in the lead role, Jon Voight, Harvey Keitel, Ed Harris, Diane Kruger, Justin Bartha, Bruce Greenwood and Helen Mirren.

The film premiered in New York City on December 13, 2007, and Walt Disney Studios Motion Pictures released it in North America on December 21. Like its predecessor, it received mixed reviews from critics but was a commercial success, grossing $459 million worldwide, becoming the ninth-highest-grossing film of 2007. A third film is in development.

== Plot ==
Six days after the end of the American Civil War, John Wilkes Booth and Michael O'Laughlen seek out cryptographer Thomas Gates and ask for his help in decoding a message copied into Booth's diary. Thomas recognizes the message as a Playfair cipher and translates it while Booth departs for Ford's Theatre to assassinate President Abraham Lincoln. Thomas solves the puzzle, discovering it is a treasure map to Cíbola, a legendary Native American city of gold. He realizes Booth and O'Laughlen are members of the Confederacy-supporting KGC and rips the cipher's pages from the diary to burn them. O'Laughlen shoots Thomas and flees with the one surviving page fragment. A dying Thomas tells his son Charles a riddle: "the debt that all men pay."

In the present, famed treasure hunter Ben Gates tells Thomas' story at a Civilian Heroes conference. Black market dealer Mitch Wilkinson interrupts Ben and produces the lost page fragment, with Thomas's name next to those of Mary Surratt and Samuel Mudd. The public believes Thomas masterminded Lincoln's murder; Ben and his father Patrick set out to disprove this by using the diary page to find Cíbola. Seeking the page, Ben recruits his friend Riley Poole to help break into his old house, which is now the residence of Dr. Abigail Chase, Director of Document Conservation and Ben's estranged ex-girlfriend. Abigail returns from a date with her new boyfriend, Connor, a White House Curator, and finds Ben and Riley. Ben convinces her to allow him to view the page.

Using spectral imaging, Ben discovers traces of the Playfair cipher on the page. Remembering Thomas's dying riddle, Ben uses its answer, "DEATH," as the cipher's keyword. The page references Edouard Rene de Laboulaye and the smaller Statue of Liberty in Paris. Abigail meets with Mitch to discuss the page, inadvertently revealing Ben's discovery. Mitch's henchmen attack Patrick in his home and secretly clone his cell phone to track Ben's progress. Traveling to Paris, Ben and Riley discover an engraving referencing the Resolute desks. They head to London, where Ben and Abigail infiltrate Buckingham Palace and solve a series of puzzles within the Palace's Resolute desk. The puzzles unlock a secret drawer containing a Pre-Columbian carved plank. Mitch pursues the trio through London and eventually obtains the wooden plank, but not before Ben photographs it.

Back in America, Patrick reluctantly asks his ex-wife, archaeo-lexicologist Dr. Emily Appleton, for help. She claims the carvings refer to the "center of the Earth" but notes some partial glyphs. Ben and Abigail convince Connor to let them see the Resolute desk in the Oval Office. Ben discovers that the second plank has been replaced by a stamp of an altered Presidential seal, which Riley identifies as the symbol for a fabled shared diary written by US Presidents containing national secrets. Ben's friend, FBI Agent Peter Sadusky, confirms the book's existence but warns that no one can read its contents without the sitting president's consent. Ben decides to kidnap the president in order to obtain the book.

Ben manipulates the president's birthday party into being held at Mount Vernon, for which he possesses blueprints. Infiltrating the festivities, he convinces the president to explore a secret tunnel with him. Ben closes the entrance's sliding door, separating the president from the Secret Service. Now alone, Ben asks the president about the book as he leads him to freedom at the tunnel's end. The president sympathetically warns Ben that his actions, while well meant, will be interpreted as an attempted kidnapping; unless Ben finds the treasure, he will be arrested. As they part ways, the president discloses that the book is hidden at the Library of Congress. Pursued by the FBI, Ben, Abigail, and Riley find the book and glance through it. They find a photograph of the missing plank and an entry by Calvin Coolidge describing his discovery of the plank in 1924. Coolidge translated it, had it destroyed, and commissioned Gutzon Borglum to carve Mount Rushmore to hide geographical evidence of Cíbola. Ben texts Patrick a copy of the plank photograph and instructs him to take it to Emily; using his cloned phone, Mitch obtains the photo and learns of their plan.

Mitch visits Emily and asks her to translate the plank; she refuses. He threatens to kill Patrick unless Emily sends him away. Patrick arrives seeking Emily's knowledge; she responds with a cryptic riddle. Patrick leaves. Mitch reveals he has acquired and memorized a letter from Queen Victoria to Confederate general Albert Pike, which contains a final clue. He burns the letter and kidnaps Emily. Ben deduces the riddle and confronts Mitch at Mount Rushmore. Leveraging his knowledge of the burned letter, Mitch forces the group to bring him along. Ben uses Mitch's clue to find a cave entrance. The group ventures in, only to be sealed inside and separated by booby traps. Navigating the traps, the group reunites and discovers a cavern containing Cíbola, which has remained preserved underneath Mount Rushmore. Cíbola's ancient sluice gates rupture, flooding the city. The group finds a door to escape through, but it becomes clear one person must remain behind to hold the door open. Mitch initially forces Ben to do so, but when Ben is knocked away by the water, Mitch sacrifices himself to let the others through. He begs Ben to give him posthumous credit for finding the treasure.

Ben, Riley, Abigail, Patrick, and Emily return to the surface, where the president prevents Ben from being arrested by claiming Ben saved him from the tunnel's accidental closing. Ben ensures that Mitch receives joint credit for the discovery and clears Thomas Gates' name by proving Booth had consulted him about the treasure, not the assassination. Now reconciled, Emily and Patrick lead an expedition to Cíbola, while Ben rekindles his relationship with Abigail.

== Cast ==
- Nicolas Cage as Benjamin Franklin "Ben" Gates, treasure hunter, historian and cryptologist
- Justin Bartha as Riley Poole, computer expert and author, Ben's best friend
- Diane Kruger as Dr. Abigail Chase, Director of Document Conservation at the National Archives, Ben's ex-girlfriend
- Jon Voight as Patrick Henry Gates, Ben's father who is divorced from his wife Emily
- Helen Mirren as Dr. Emily Appleton-Gates, professor of Native American studies, Ben's mother who is divorced from her husband, Patrick
- Ed Harris as Mitchell "Mitch" Wilkinson, a black market dealer
- Harvey Keitel as FBI Special Agent Peter Sadusky
- Armando Riesco as FBI Special Agent Horlicks
- Alicia Coppola as FBI Special Agent Spellman
- Albert Hall as Dr. Nichols
- Bruce Greenwood as President of the United States
- Ty Burrell as Connor, White House curator, Abigail's new boyfriend.

Randy Travis makes a cameo appearance, performing at the Mount Vernon party. Small supporting parts are played by Michael Maize and Timothy V. Murphy as Mitch's two accomplices Daniel and Seth respectively; Joel Gretsch and Billy Unger as Gates's ancestors Thomas Gates and Charles Carroll Gates; Christian Camargo as John Wilkes Booth; Brent Briscoe as Michael O'Laughlen; and Zachary Gordon as a boy who gets into a heated argument with Gates over a Lincoln conspiracy. In France, Guillaume Gallienne and Scali Delpeyrat appear (uncredited) as the French policemen. Abraham Lincoln is played by Glenn Beck. (Note: The actor who played Lincoln is not the commentator and radio host, Glenn Beck.)

== Production ==
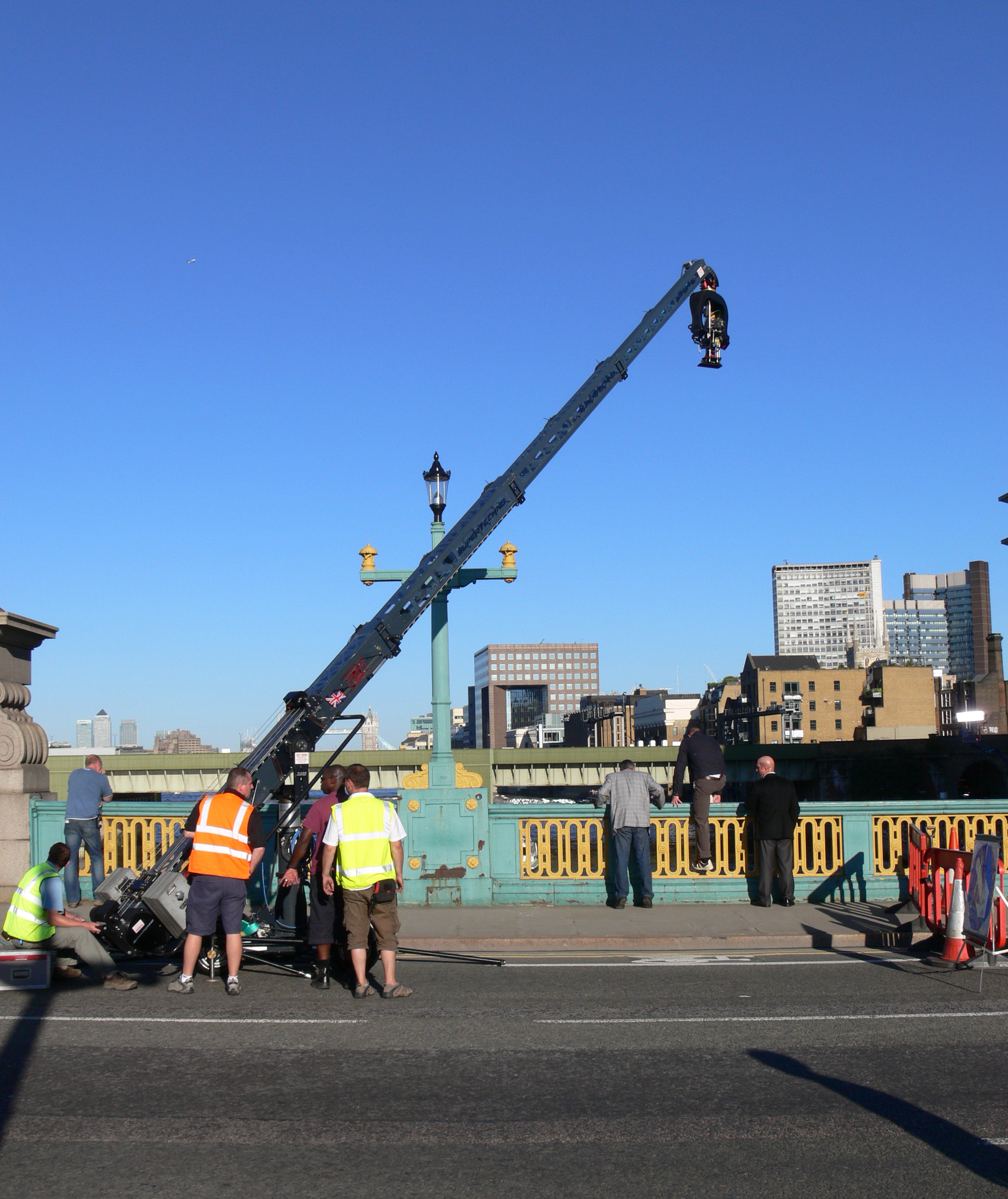
Shooting of the film in London

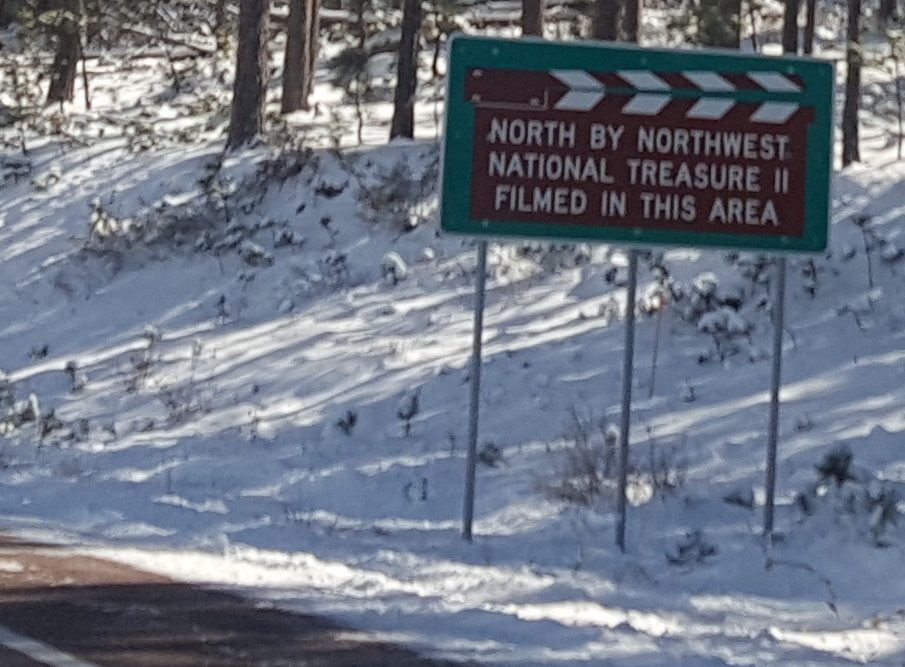
A sign on the road approaching Mount Rushmore

It was stated in the first film's commentary that there were no plans for a sequel, but due to the first film's impressive box-office performance (earning $347.5 million worldwide), a sequel was given the go-ahead in 2005.

Principal photography began on March 5, 2007, and ended in June 2007.

Many scenes of historic locations were filmed on location, including the scenes at Mount Vernon and Mount Rushmore. The beginning of filming was marked by the performance of a smudging ceremony by Gerard Baker, superintendent of Mount Rushmore and a member of the Three Affiliated Tribes. Filming at Mount Rushmore took longer than initially scheduled, due to inclement weather and the decision to change the setting of additional scenes to the area around Mount Rushmore to take advantage of the Black Hills backdrop. The scene at the beginning of the film in which Riley is signing copies of his book of the Templar Treasure until his Ferrari is confiscated by the IRS took place at the street level Borders bookstore of Garfinckel's.

== Soundtrack ==
The soundtrack to National Treasure: Book of Secrets was released on December 18, 2007.

== Reception ==
=== Box office ===
National Treasure: Book of Secrets grossed $44.8 million in its opening week, and was the top grossing film at the box office. It remained in first at the box office for two more weeks, grossing $35.7 million and $20.1 million, respectively, until it was dethroned by The Bucket List ($19.4 million).

The film grossed $220 million in North America and $239.3 million in other territories for a total gross of $459 million, against a budget of $130 million, making it the ninth-highest-grossing film of 2007, and the highest-grossing film in the series. It took 38 days to outgross the first film ($347.5 million).

=== Critical response ===
On Rotten Tomatoes the film holds an approval rating of 35% based on 128 reviews, with an average rating of 4.80/10. The site's critical consensus reads, "A talented cast goes to waste in the improbable National Treasure: Book of Secrets, which is eerily similar to the first film." On Metacritic, the film has a weighted average score of 48 out of 100, based on 26 critics, indicating "mixed or average reviews". Audiences polled by CinemaScore gave the film an average grade of "A−" on an A+ to F scale.

Roger Ebert gave the film two out of four stars.

British film critic Peter Bradshaw of The Guardian disputed the implication of British support for the Confederate side in the American Civil War.

== Accolades ==
The film earned two Razzie Award nominations including Worst Actor for Nicolas Cage (also for Ghost Rider and Next) and Worst Supporting Actor for Jon Voight (also for Bratz: The Movie, September Dawn, and Transformers), but lost both categories to Eddie Murphy for Norbit. The film was nominated for Best Movie at the 2008 MTV Movie Awards, but lost to Transformers.

== Home media ==
National Treasure: Book of Secrets was released on DVD, UMD, and Blu-ray Disc on May 20, 2008 (June 2, 2008, in the UK). A two-disc collector's edition DVD was also released. In the opening weekend, 3,178,631 DVD units were sold, bringing in $50,826,310 in revenue. As of August 2009, 5,873,640 DVD units have been sold, generating revenue of $93,132,076. This does not include Blu-ray Disc sales or DVD rentals.

The film has been retitled National Treasure 2: Book of Secrets for all three releases. The film's official website has also been changed accordingly.

A special edition, called the "National Treasure Presidential Edition", contains National Treasure and National Treasure 2: Book of Secrets inside a letter book which is a replica of the Presidents' secret book from National Treasure 2: Book of Secrets.

== Novelizations ==
Disney Press published an official novelization of the screenplay titled National Treasure 2: Book of Secrets The Junior Novel on November 6, 2007. Parts of the story in the novel version differ slightly from what was actually filmed, owing to changes being made in the screenplay prior to and during production. For example, in the novel, Ben and Abigail photograph the wooden plank found hidden in the Queen's desk and leave it behind, with the car chase following. However, in the movie, they take the plank with them on the chase.

Also published on the same day as the official novelization was a companion youth novel Changing Tides: A Gates Family Mystery by Catherine Hapka. Its story is set in England in the year 1612 and is the first in a series of planned historical novels about the Gates family. The epilog from Changing Tides is included at the back of the National Treasure book. The second youth novel by Hapka, Midnight Ride: A Gates Family Mystery, was published on March 8, 2008.

== Accuracy ==
The group mentioned in the film as being behind the assassination of Abraham Lincoln and pursuing the city of gold, The Knights of the Golden Circle, had actually disbanded in 1863. It was based in Cincinnati, Ohio, where its founder George W. L. Bickley resided. A native of Virginia, Bickley had been known for being an adventurer and also bad with finances. His focus was not on preserving the Confederate States of America (CSA), but restoring slavery in neighboring countries to the south, which he wanted to make part of a proposed nation dubbed "Golden Circle." While some members of the group would join the Confederate Army, Bickley was more focused on colonizing parts of northern Mexico as slave states. He would not join the Confederate Army until after his expeditions in Mexico faltered in 1863. Soon afterwards, the organization was exposed and many members were arrested while attempting to steal numerous gold shipments from San Francisco Bay.

Following the outbreak of the American Civil War numerous Golden Circle members were not focused on fighting Union states north of the Mason-Dixon Line as the film suggests, but were pre-occupied with making the Union territory of New Mexico a part of the proposed Golden Circle nation. Those who operated in the North mostly aligned with Copperhead politicians who preferred a negotiated end to the war. Bickley, who served the Confederate Army for months as a surgeon to General Braxton Bragg, would be captured in Indiana in July 1863 on charges of being a Confederate spy and remained in house arrest until October 1865. The month before his arrest, Bickley abandoned the Confederate Army after preferring to settle in Tennessee. Former members would also name its successor organization the Order of the Sons of Liberty in 1864, the year before Lincoln's assassination. This successor organization was exposed the same year it was founded and members were arrested and tried for treason.

The film's suggestion that Britain wanted a strong alliance with the Confederate States of America was also highly unlikely. Efforts which were made by Confederate Secretary of State Judah P. Benjamin to persuade Britain to simply recognize the Confederate States of America proved unsuccessful.

The wooden plank map hidden within both Resolute Desks that leads to the location of Cíbola would have been of no use to the Confederacy, as the desks were constructed and delivered between the years 1879 and 1880, some 15 years after the American Civil War concluded and the disbandment of the Confederate states. Similarly, the clues left by Édouard Laboulaye would have been equally of no use, as the earliest models of the Statue of Liberty and all subsequent replicas were all constructed no earlier than 1875, 10 years after the end of the Civil War.

== Future ==
In May 2008 Jon Turteltaub confirmed that there would be additional National Treasure movies, but acknowledged that the creative team would take their time on the second sequel. That same year, The Walt Disney Company registered the IP for the domain names for future films.

In October 2013, Turteltaub stated that all individuals involved with the first two movies want to make a third film. He further stated that the delays have been due to working out the script, and that he expected the film to begin production in 2015. By 2014, producer Jerry Bruckheimer announced that a new team of writers were working on the script. In May 2016, Nicolas Cage confirmed that the script was still being sorted out. By September 2017, it was revealed that a script had been finished, but that the executives at Walt Disney Studios Motion Pictures were not satisfied with the story. In July 2018, Turteltaub stated that the script was "close", but the studios still weren't going to green-light production yet.

In January 2020, after years of development hell, it was announced that a third film was officially moving forward with a script from Chris Bremner. Jerry Bruckheimer was set to return as producer and the original cast was expected to return as well.

In April 2022, Nicolas Cage was hosting an AMA (Ask Me Anything) thread on Reddit where he commented on the possibility of future installments: "No, the priority was to turn it into a TV show so I would say probably not."

At the D23 Expo of September 2022 it was announced a sequel TV series would be released on the Disney+ streaming service. The title of the series was also confirmed to be National Treasure: Edge of History. Lisette Alexis was confirmed to play the lead role of Jess, a 20-year old DREAMer who sets out on an adventure to uncover her family's history. Cage confirmed he would not be reprising his role for the series. Jerry Bruckheimer was confirmed to serve as executive producer for the series. The series had a two-episode premiere on December 14, 2022.

In August 2026, Jon Turteltaub revealed that a third film was in development, suggesting that Nicolas Cage would return. However, in October, Cage clarified that he had not signed on for the sequel and had yet to decide whether he wanted to reprise his role.

== See also ==
- Assassination of Abraham Lincoln
- Playfair cipher
