= Armando Riesco =

Puerto Rican actor

- Occupation: Actor
- Years active: 1999–present
- Spouse: Shirley Rumierk

Armando Riesco (/riˈɛskoʊ/) is a Puerto Rican actor.

== Early life ==
Riesco is the son of Cuban immigrants. He was raised in San Juan, Puerto Rico where he attended Colegio San Ignacio de Loyola. He then attended Northwestern University in Illinois. After graduating, he relocated to New York City where he began to work in local and off-Broadway productions as well as film, television, video games and commercials.

== Career ==
=== Film ===
Many of Riesco's film roles have been in critically acclaimed independent films such as Pieces of April starring Katie Holmes, Garden State starring Natalie Portman, and Adult World, starring John Cusack and Emma Roberts.

He has also appeared in major Hollywood films including National Treasure, Oliver Stone's World Trade Center, Spike Lee's 25th Hour, and Fever Pitch, starring Jimmy Fallon and Drew Barrymore.

=== Television ===
In addition to his film work, Riesco has had roles on such popular drama series as Royal Pains and Law & Order. In 2006, he was also a regular cast member on the CBS medical drama 3 lbs, starring Stanley Tucci. He had a recurring role, playing Pecas, in Season 3 of Queen of the South. He is also known for his work as a series regular on the Showtime series The Chi. He reprises the role of Agent Hendricks from the National Treasure movies in National Treasure: Edge of History on Disney+.

=== Other ===
Riesco lives in New York City, and frequently collaborates with writer director Jason Chaet. Their first feature film Seneca won several Film Festival awards and was picked up by HBO Max in 2019.

== Filmography ==
=== Film ===
Year	Title	Role	Notes
2002	25th Hour	Phelan	
2003	Pieces of April	Tyrone	
2004	Garden State	Jesse	
2004	National Treasure	FBI Agent Hendricks	
2005	Fever Pitch	Gerard	
2005	Harsh Times	Alex	
2006	World Trade Center	Antonio Rodrigues	
2006	Bella	Francisco	
2006	Helen at Risk	Ronnie Guyette	Short
2007	National Treasure: Book of Secrets	FBI Agent Hendricks	
2008	Shot	Jimmy	Short
2008	Che	Dariel "Benigno" Ramírez	
2008	Resolve	Hector	Short
2009	Brooklyn's Finest	Detective George Montress	
2009	Snapshots	-	Short
2009	The Tested	Julian Varone	
2011	Remember	-	Short
2012	Putzel	Jake	
2013	Adult World	Rubia	
2013	7E	Rich	
2013	And Then There Was Luz	-	Short
2013	80/20	Matt	
2013	Truth Will Out	Gary	Short
2015	Diamond Cartel	Ruslan (voice)	
2016	The Lost Flowers	Izko	Short
2018	White Fang	Curtis (voice)	
2018	Can You Ever Forgive Me?	Male (voice)	
2019	Seneca	David Seneca	
2023	Alone	Handyman	Short
2023	Dumb Money	Additional Voices (voice)	

=== Television ===
Year	Title	Role	Notes
1999	Early Edition	Orderly	Episode: "Fatal Edition: Part 2"
2002	Law & Order: Criminal Intent	Scott Calderon	Episode: "Dead"
2002	Third Watch	'Pee-Wee'	Episode: "The Chosen Few"
2003	Dora the Explorer	Daddy Monster (voice)	Episode: "Boo!"
2006	The Path to 9/11	John Atkinson	Episode: "Part 1 & 2"
2007	3 lbs	Dr. Thomas Flores	Main Cast
2008	Law & Order	Ruben Alvera	Episode: "Burn Card"
2009	Fringe	Gavin	Episode: "The Transformation"
2009	Kings	Sean Savoy	Recurring Cast
2009	Law & Order	Gregory Cardenas	Episode: "Shotgun"
2010	Royal Pains	Oscar	Episode: "Medusa" & "Mano a Mano"
2010	Army Wives	Dan	Episode: "Forward March"
2011	A Gifted Man	Tavo	Recurring Cast
2013	Blue Bloods	Raoul Delgado	Episode: "To Protect and Serve"
2013	Elementary	Jacob Esparza	Episode: "An Unnatural Arrangement"
2015	Sneaky Pete	Officer Inaba	Episode: "Pilot"
2015	Unforgettable	Zeke	Episode: "Gut Check"
2016	Vinyl	Paul Bezak	Episode: "Cyclone"
2016	The Family	Corey Sanchez	Recurring Cast
2016	Power	Hector Núñez	Episode: "Help Me" & "Trust Me"
2017–21	Bull	AUSA Dennis Olsen	Guest Cast: Season 1 & 4–5
2018	Queen of the South	Pecas	Recurring Cast: Season 3
2018	Wolverine	Taxidermist/Jackson	Recurring Cast: Season 1
2018–19	The Chi	Detective Cruz	Main Cast: Season 1–2
2019	The Code	Major Acevedo	Episode: "Secret Squirrel"
2021	Law & Order: Special Victims Unit	Edward Buddusky	Episode: "Trick-Rolled at the Moulin"
2021	The Equalizer	ADA Walter Ellis	Episode: "The People Aren't Ready"
2022	Two Year Man	Miguel	Main Cast
2022	FBI: International	James Greer	Episode: "Copper Pots and Daggers"
2022–23	National Treasure: Edge of History	Agent Hendricks	Recurring Cast
2023	Alma's Way	Juan (voice)	Episode: "Alma Goes to Puerto Rico"
2023	And Just Like That...	Paul Bennett	Episode: "Trick or Treat"

=== Video Games ===
Year	Title	Role
2002	Grand Theft Auto: Vice City	Pierre La Ponce/Victor 'Vic' Vance (Credited as supplier)
2003	Midnight Club II	Hector
2004	Grand Theft Auto: San Andreas	Officer Hernandez/Pedestrian
2005	The Warriors	Additional Civilian
2006	Grand Theft Auto: Vice City Stories	People of Vice City
2008	Midnight Club: Los Angeles	Jeff The Mechanic
2008	Grand Theft Auto IV	The Crowd of Liberty City
2008	Need for Speed: Undercover	Primary
2009	Grand Theft Auto: The Ballad of Gay Tony	Parking Attendant
2010	Need for Speed: World	Unknown
2015	Just Cause 3	Mario Frigo
2021	Grand Theft Auto: The Trilogy – The Definitive Edition	Pierre La Ponce/Victor 'Vic' Vance & Officer Hernandez/Pedestrian
