= Jerry Bruckheimer Films =

American film production company

Jerry Bruckheimer Films Inc.
- Logo used since 1997
- Formerly: Don Simpson/Jerry Bruckheimer Films (1983–1996) (Note: JBF reuses the Don Simpson/Jerry Bruckheimer Films name and logo for sequels to movies originally co-produced by Don Simpson.)
- Type: Private
- Industry: Entertainment/film industry
- Founded: August 10, 1983; 43 years ago (Don Simpson/Jerry Bruckheimer Films); December 1995; 30 years ago
- Founder: Jerry Bruckheimer; Don Simpson
- Headquarters: Santa Monica, California, U.S.
- Area served: Worldwide
- Products: Motion pictures
- Services: Film production
- Owner: Jerry Bruckheimer
- Divisions: Jerry Bruckheimer Television
- Website: jbfilms.com

Jerry Bruckheimer Films Inc. (JBF) is an American film production company formed by Jerry Bruckheimer in December 1995, after cutting his ties with film producer Don Simpson before his death in 1996. It produces blockbuster films such as the Pirates of the Caribbean film series.

== Logo ==
The production logo of the company shows a tree without leaves, on which leaves appear when struck by lightning. As the camera pans out, the name "Jerry Bruckheimer Films" appears. The tree was modeled after an oak on a Kentucky property owned by Bruckheimer. According to Bruckheimer, the lightning bolt that strikes the tree symbolizes "the power of an idea".

== History ==
Longtime producer Jerry Bruckheimer co-founded Don Simpson/Jerry Bruckheimer Films in 1983 with Don Simpson; it was initially an affiliate production company of Paramount Pictures. Don Simpson/Jerry Bruckheimer Films produced such hits as (among others) the franchises Beverly Hills Cop and Bad Boys. After breaking up an alliance with Paramount Pictures, he had moved to The Walt Disney Studios in 1991, and the production company produced such hits for Disney as Crimson Tide (1995) and The Rock (1996).

Jerry Bruckheimer Films was founded in 1995 by Bruckheimer, after he cut ties with Simpson; its first movie under that branding was Simon West's action thriller movie Con Air (1997), starring Nicolas Cage. The company is currently headquartered in Santa Monica, California. He established a first-look deal with Disney producing films for the Walt Disney Pictures, Touchstone Pictures, and Hollywood Pictures banners. In 2013, the company shifted ties from Disney to Paramount after 22 years working at the studio. The company subsequently went independent in 2020.

The company also has a television production division, Jerry Bruckheimer Television (also Jerry Bruckheimer TV or JBTV), which is best known for producing (among others) the television franchise CSI and Netflix's urban fantasy superhero television series Lucifer. This division was originally formed in 1996, with the first television production being an adaptation of the 1995 film Dangerous Minds, followed by Soldier of Fortune, Inc., a syndicated television series the company is working with Rysher Entertainment. In June 2016, the division became an independent outfit, ending a 15-year exclusive deal with Warner Bros. Television. In July 2017, the division signed a contract with CBS Television Studios.

== Filmography ==
=== Don Simpson/Jerry Bruckheimer Films (1983–1996; 2003; 2020–2024) ===
==== 1980s ====
- Flashdance (1983) (co-production with Paramount Pictures)
- Thief of Hearts (1984) (co-production with Paramount Pictures)
- Beverly Hills Cop (1984) (co-production with Paramount Pictures)
- Top Gun (1986) (co-production with Paramount Pictures)
- Beverly Hills Cop II (1987) (co-production with Paramount Pictures)

==== 1990s ====
- Days of Thunder (1990) (first logo; co-production with Paramount Pictures)
- The Ref (1994) (co-production with Touchstone Pictures; executive produced)
- Bad Boys (1995) (co-production with Columbia Pictures)
- Crimson Tide (1995) (co-production with Hollywood Pictures)
- Dangerous Minds (1995) (co-production with Hollywood Pictures)
- The Rock (1996) (last film co-produced with Don Simpson before he died post-production; co-production with Hollywood Pictures)

==== 2000s ====
- Bad Boys II (2003) (co-production with Columbia Pictures)

==== 2020s ====
- Bad Boys for Life (2020) (co-production with Columbia Pictures, 2.0 Entertainment and Overbrook Entertainment)
- Top Gun: Maverick (2022) (co-production with Paramount Pictures and Skydance Media)
- Bad Boys: Ride or Die (2024) (co-production with Columbia Pictures, 2.0 Entertainment and Westbrook Studios)
- Beverly Hills Cop: Axel F (2024) (co-production with Eddie Murphy Productions; distributed by Netflix)

=== Jerry Bruckheimer Films (1997–present) ===
==== 1990s ====
- Con Air (1997) (co-production with Touchstone Pictures)
- Armageddon (1998) (co-production with Touchstone Pictures and Valhalla Motion Pictures)
- Enemy of the State (1998) (co-production with Touchstone Pictures and Scott Free Productions)

==== 2000s ====
- Gone in 60 Seconds (2000) (co-production with Touchstone Pictures)
- Coyote Ugly (2000) (co-production with Touchstone Pictures)
- Remember the Titans (2000) (co-production with Walt Disney Pictures and Technical Black Films)
- Pearl Harbor (2001) (co-production with Touchstone Pictures)
- Black Hawk Down (2002) (co-production with Columbia Pictures, Revolution Studios and Scott Free Productions)
- Bad Company (2002) (co-production with Touchstone Pictures and Stillking Productions)
- Kangaroo Jack (2003) (co-production with Warner Bros. Pictures and Castle Rock Entertainment)
- Pirates of the Caribbean: The Curse of the Black Pearl (2003) (co-production with Walt Disney Pictures)
- Veronica Guerin (2003) (co-production with Touchstone Pictures)
- King Arthur (2004) (co-production with Touchstone Pictures, World 2000 Entertainment and Green Hills Productions)
- National Treasure (2004) (co-production with Walt Disney Pictures, Junction Entertainment and Saturn Films)
- Glory Road (2006) (co-production with Walt Disney Pictures, Texas Western Productions and Glory Road Productions)
- Pirates of the Caribbean: Dead Man's Chest (2006) (co-production with Walt Disney Pictures)
- Déjà Vu (2006) (co-production with Touchstone Pictures and Scott Free Productions)
- Pirates of the Caribbean: At World's End (2007) (co-production with Walt Disney Pictures)
- National Treasure: Book of Secrets (2007) (co-production with Walt Disney Pictures, Junction Entertainment and Saturn Films)
- Confessions of a Shopaholic (2009) (co-production with Touchstone Pictures)
- G-Force (2009) (co-production with Walt Disney Pictures)

==== 2010s ====
- Prince of Persia: The Sands of Time (2010) (co-production with Walt Disney Pictures)
- The Sorcerer's Apprentice (2010) (co-production with Walt Disney Pictures, Saturn Films and Broken Road Productions)
- Pirates of the Caribbean: On Stranger Tides (2011) (co-production with Walt Disney Pictures)
- The Lone Ranger (2013) (co-production with Walt Disney Pictures, Infinitum Nihil and Blind Wink Productions)
- Deliver Us from Evil (2014) (co-production with Screen Gems)
- Pirates of the Caribbean: Dead Men Tell No Tales (2017) (co-production with Walt Disney Pictures)
- 12 Strong (2018) (co-production with Warner Bros. Pictures, Lionsgate, Alcon Entertainment, Black Label Media and Torridon Films)
- Gemini Man (2019) (co-production with Paramount Pictures, Skydance Media, Fosun Pictures and Alibaba Pictures)

==== 2020s ====
- Secret Headquarters (2022) (co-production with Paramount Pictures; distributed by Paramount+)
- The Ministry of Ungentlemanly Warfare (2024) (co-production with Lionsgate Films and Black Bear Pictures)
- Young Woman and the Sea (2024) (co-production with Walt Disney Pictures)
- Hans Zimmer & Friends: Diamond in the Desert (2025) (co-production with Executive Visions Inc., RCI Global, SiFi Films and Trafalgar Releasing)
- F1 (2025) (co-production with Apple Studios, Dawn Apollo Films, Monolith Pictures, Plan B Entertainment and Apple TV+; distributed by Warner Bros. Pictures)

== Television division ==
Jerry Bruckheimer Television was founded on August 28, 1996, as the television production division of Jerry Bruckheimer Films. The division became one of the most prominent television production companies in the United States, particularly known for its crime drama series. At its peak in the 2005–06 television season, Bruckheimer made history as the first producer to have 10 shows air in a single season. Three of his television series simultaneously ranked among the top 10 most-watched programs in the United States. The division ended a 15-year exclusive deal with Warner Bros. Television in June 2016, becoming an independent outfit. In July 2017, it signed an overall deal with CBS Television Studios. In 2022, KristiAnne Reed was promoted to CEO, replacing Jonathan Littman, who stepped down after 25 years in the position.

Jerry Bruckheimer Television
- Type: Division
- Industry: Television
- Founded: August 28, 1996; 30 years ago
- Founder: Jerry Bruckheimer
- Headquarters: Santa Monica, California, United States
- Services: Television production
- Owner: Jerry Bruckheimer

=== TV series ===
| Title | Original run | Network | Notes |
|---|---|---|---|
| Dangerous Minds | 1996–1997 | ABC | credited as Don Simpson/Jerry Bruckheimer Films; co-production with Predawn Productions and Touchstone Television |
| Soldier of Fortune, Inc. | 1997–1999 | First-run syndication | credited as Don Simpson/Jerry Bruckheimer Films; co-production with Rysher Entertainment |
| CSI: Crime Scene Investigation | 2000–2015 | CBS | co-production with CBS Productions (seasons 1–6), CBS Television Studios (seasons 7–15) and Alliance Atlantis (seasons 1–8) |
| The Amazing Race | 2001–present | CBS | co-production with CBS Studios, ABC Signature (seasons 1–36), 20th Television (season 37–), Earthview, Inc. (seasons 1–2), Worldrace Productions (season 3–present) and Amazing Race Productions (season 3–present) |
| CSI: Miami | 2002–2012 | CBS | co-production with CBS Productions (seasons 1–5), CBS Television Studios (seasons 5–10) and Alliance Atlantis (seasons 1–6) |
| Without a Trace | 2002–2009 | CBS | co-production with CBS Productions (seasons 1–4), CBS Paramount Network Television (2006–2009) (seasons 5–7) and Warner Bros. Television |
| Profiles from the Front Line | 2003 | ABC | co-production with Warner Bros. Television and Profiles Television Productions |
| Skin | 2003–2005 | Fox/SOAPnet | co-production with Warner Bros. Television and Hoosier Karma Productions |
| Cold Case | 2003–2010 | CBS | co-production with CBS Productions (seasons 1–3), CBS Television Studios (seasons 4–7) and Warner Bros. Television |
| CSI: NY | 2004–2013 | CBS | co-production with CBS Productions (seasons 1–2), CBS Television Studios (seasons 3–9) and Alliance Atlantis (seasons 1–4) |
| E-Ring | 2005–2006 | NBC | co-production with Warner Bros. Television |
| Just Legal | 2005–2006 | The WB | co-production with Warner Bros. Television |
| Close to Home | 2005–2007 | CBS | co-production with Hoosier Karma and Warner Bros. Television |
| Justice | 2006–2007 | Fox | co-production with Warner Bros. Television |
| Modern Men | 2006 | The WB | co-production with Marsh McCall Productions and Warner Bros. Television |
| Eleventh Hour | 2008–2009 | CBS | co-production with Granada America and Warner Bros. Television |
| The Forgotten | 2009–2010 | ABC | co-production with Warner Bros. Television |
| Chase | 2010–2011 | NBC | co-production with Warner Bros. Television |
| Miami Medical | 2010 | CBS | co-production with Warner Bros. Television and Skim Milk Productions |
| Take the Money & Run | 2011 | ABC | co-production with Warner Horizon Television and Profiles Television Productions |
| Hostages | 2013–2014 | CBS | co-production with Warner Bros. Television and Nana.10.Co.il |
| CSI: Cyber | 2015–2016 | CBS | co-production with CBS Productions |
| Lucifer | 2016–2021 | Fox/Netflix | co-production with Warner Bros. Television and DC Entertainment |
| Training Day | 2017 | CBS | co-production with Warner Bros. Television |
| L.A.'s Finest | 2019–2020 | Spectrum Originals | credited as Don Simpson/Jerry Bruckheimer Films; co-production with Sony Pictures Television, 2.0 Entertainment, The Brandons and Green Eggs and Pam Productions |
| Council of Dads | 2020 | NBC | co-production with Universal Television and Midwest Livestock Productions |
| Hightown | 2020–2024 | Starz | co-production with Lionsgate Television (season 3) |
| CSI: Vegas | 2021–2024 | CBS | co-production with CBS Studios and Trace Pictures |
| American Gigolo | 2022 | Showtime | co-production with Paramount Television Studios and Three Rivers Entertainment |
| Fire Country | 2022–present | CBS | co-production with CBS Studios |
| National Treasure: Edge of History | 2022–2023 | Disney+ | co-production with ABC Signature |
| The Real CSI: Miami | 2024–present | CBS | co-production with Magical Elves |
| Sheriff Country | 2025–present | CBS | co-production with CBS Studios, Midwest Livestock Productions and Daily Dramatic Productions |
| Boston Blue | 2025–present | CBS | co-production with CBS Studios and The Brandons; Spin-off of Blue Bloods |

=== TV films ===
- Max Q (1998) (ABC; co-production with Touchstone Television)
- Swing Vote (1999) (ABC; co-production with Columbia TriStar Television)
