= Zuri Reed =

American actress

- Born: February 15, 1996 (age 30); Philadelphia, Pennsylvania
- Occupation: Actress
- Years active: 2010–present

Zuri Reed is an American actress. She is best known for playing Tasha Rivers in the action adventure series National Treasure: Edge of History and will play Tasha in the upcoming crime drama series Power: Origins.

== Early life ==
Reed was born in Philadelphia, Pennsylvania. She would lead school plays and church choirs as a child. She got into acting after her mother heard on the Wendy Williams Radio Show that The Lion King on Broadway was having auditions in New York for Young Nala and Simba. She ended up getting the role of Nala and played her for 2 years. She graduated from the Philadelphia High School for the Creative and Performing Arts.

== Career ==
She made her on-screen debut in a episode of the drama series Law & Order: Special Victims Unit. She also made a minor appearance in the black comedy series Applesauce portraying Kimberley. She had a recurring role as the Zulu Girl Yvonne in the drama series The Get Down. One of her first big roles came playing Dami in the comedy show Flatbush Misdemeanors Her biggest role so far has been playing Tasha Rivers in the action adventure series National Treasure: Edge of History. In March 2026 it was revealed that she would play Tasha in the upcoming crime drama series Power: Origins.

== Filmography ==
=== Film ===
Year	Title	Role	Notes
2015	Applesauce	Kimberly	
2021	Killer Among Us	Danielle	
2025	Knight Patrol	Primo	

=== Television ===
Year	Title	Role	Notes
2010	Law & Order: Special Victims Unit	Macy	Episode; Saviour
2017	The Get Down	Zulu Girl Yvonne	2 episodes
2019	The Last O.G.	Student 1	Episode; Sound of Da Police
2021	Flatbush Misdemeanors	Dami	8 episodes
2022-2023	National Treasure: Edge of History	Tasha Rivers	10 episodes
2026-	Power: Origins	Tasha	In Production
