= Max Booth III =

American screenwriter and publisher

- Born: July 4, 1993 (age 33); Lake Station, Indiana, U.S.
- Occupations: Author; Publisher; Screenwriter
- Spouse: Lori Michelle
- Writing career
- Language: English
- Genre: Horror
- Notable work: We Need to Do Something

Max Booth III (born July 4, 1993) is an American author, screenwriter, and publisher best known for their work in the horror field. Their nonfiction writing has appeared in LitReactor, CrimeReads, the San Antonio Current, Fangoria, and Film-14. Their novella We Need to Do Something is the basis for a film of the same name shot in secret during the 2020 COVID-19 epidemic. Booth also co-owns and operates Ghoulish Books, an independent publishing house and bookstore, with their wife, Lori Michelle. They formerly served as the managing editor of Dark Moon Digest, a horror fiction quarterly that discontinued publication in 2022. Since 2023, they have edited the horror magazine Ghoulish Tales.

== Early life ==
Booth was born July 4, 1993, in Lake Station, Indiana. They began writing at the age of seven as a way to cope with the death of their dog. Prior to being published, they were active on Storiesville.com, a website for aspiring writers to post their work and receive feedback; after the site became defunct, Booth began promoting their writing elsewhere, eventually publishing their first novel, Toxicity, in 2014.

== Career ==
Following their first novel, Booth published three books between 2014 and 2016. Concurrently they founded the independent press Perpetual Motion Machine Publishing (later rebranded as Ghoulish Books) with then-girlfriend (later wife) Michelle. Booth also became the managing editor of Dark Moon Digest, a horror digest, for which Michelle served as the editor-in-chief. They later discontinued Dark Moon Digest and launched Ghoulish Tales in its place.

In 2019, Booth published their fifth novel, Carnivorous Lunar Activities, Fangoria's third book under their FANGORIA Presents imprint. In 2020, they published We Need to Do Something, the basis for the film of the same name, which was filmed in secret during the COVID-19 pandemic. The same year, their novel Touch the Night was published by Cemetery Dance.

As of 2024, Booth operates a bookstore called Ghoulish Books dedicated to horror novels and merchandise, located in Selma, Texas.

== Personal life ==
They currently live in San Antonio, TX.

== Bibliography ==
=== Novels ===
- Toxicity (2014)
- The Mind is a Razorblade (2014)
- How to Successfully Kidnap Strangers (2015)
- The Nightly Disease (2016)
- Carnivorous Lunar Activities (2019)
- Touch the Night (2020)
- Maggots Screaming! (2022)
- I Believe in Mister Bones (2024)

=== Novellas ===
- Black (2013)
- Everywhere You've Bled and Everywhere You Will (2017)
- We Need to Do Something (2020)
- Indiana Death Song (2023)
- The 'Dillo (2024)

=== Story Collections ===
- True Stories Told By a Liar (2012)
- They Might Be Demons (2013)
- Abnormal Statistics (2023)

=== Anthologies (as editor) ===
- Zombie Jesus and Other True Stories (2012)
- Zombies Need Love, Too (2013)
- So it Goes: a Tribute to Kurt Vonnegut (2013)
- Long Distance Drunks: a Tribute to Charles Bukowski (2014)
- Truth or Dare? (2014)
- Lost Signals (2016)
- Lost Films (2018)
- Tales from the Crust: An Anthology of Pizza Horror (2019)
- Lost Contact (2021)
