= Lisette Olivera =

American actress (born 1999)

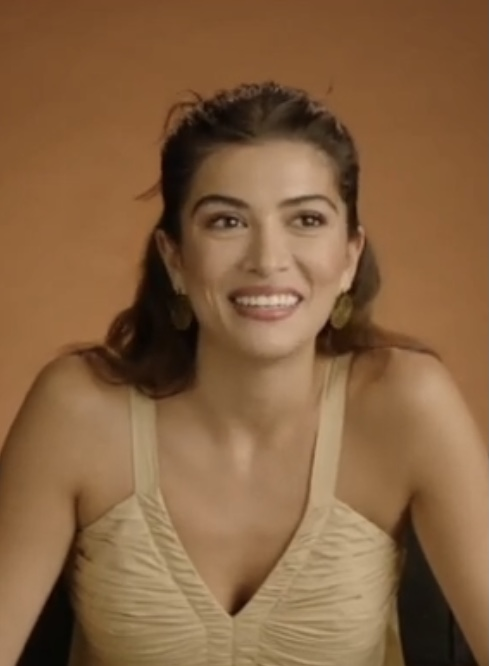
- Olivera in 2022
- Born: Lisette Alexís Gutiérrez; April 16, 1999 (age 27); Los Angeles, California, U.S.
- Occupation: Actress
- Years active: 2018–present
- Website: Official website

Lisette Alexís Gutiérrez (born April 16, 1999), known professionally as Lisette Alexis and Lisette Olivera, is an American actress. She is best known for her role in the Disney+ series National Treasure: Edge of History, an extension of the National Treasure franchise.

== Early life ==
Lisette Alexís Gutiérrez's parents were born in Mexico, and she is of Mexican descent through multiple generations. She was born in the United States on April 16, 1999, (Note: One otherwise broad source, the Economic Times, says "Mexican-born" but a Disney source, and the subject in an interview, are clear about US-born.) and grew up in the suburbs of Los Angeles, partly brought up by her grandfather. Her mother dissuaded her from a career in acting, pushing her towards more "economically sufficient" areas, and she instead trained as a dancer from childhood, and also studied vocals, piano and guitar. When she was old enough to drive herself, she auditioned for short films in nearby Hollywood. She modeled in college.

== Career ==
Billed originally as Lisette Alexis, she has performed professionally in several films and two series. Her screen acting career began with the short film Feint, released in 2019, the year in which she was also featured in the fourth season of the Brat TV teen drama web series Total Eclipse as Belle. Subsequently, she played a role in the psychological horror film We Need to Do Something and took significant roles in two short films.

After detailed summer 2021 auditions, Olivera was announced in the lead role for the National Treasure series, billed as Lisette Alexis, in October 2021, ahead of the rest of the cast. She later released the first word, in a "behind the scenes" post, about commencement of filming. Later references, and screen credits, list her as Lisette Olivera. The series was the first new media release in the National Treasure franchise in around 15 years, with a production budget of around 80 million dollars. Olivera's character, Jess Valenzuela (originally planned as "Jess Morales"), is a 22-year-old aspirant cryptologist and Latina DREAMer. Co-stars include Catherine Zeta-Jones and Harvey Keitel, and she has mentioned that she learned a lot from, and was mentored by, Zeta-Jones.

Olivera's performance garnered positive reviews, including from CBR, which stated that "her talent is far more deserving of the big screen than a streaming series. It's clear that she could handle sharing equal billing with Nicolas Cage in National Treasure 3", and Yahoo! Entertainment, which described her as "earnest and charming".

It was announced that Olivera would be joining the cast of FBI during its seventh season as a temporary partner for John Boyd's character, Stuart Scola. However, Olivera departed the show after five episodes.

== Filmography ==
=== Film ===
Year	Title	Role	Notes and references
2019	Feint	Donna	
2021	I Always Said After	Alma Luna (main role)	
2021	We Need to Do Something	Amy	
2022	Waltz of the Angels	Gabby (lead role)	
TBA	Pig Village †	TBA	

Key
†	Denotes films that have not yet been released

=== TV and web TV ===
Year	Title	Role	Notes and references
2018 (Note: Series ran 2018 to 2019, Olivera (as Alexis) had a role in one season, in 2019.)	Total Eclipse	Belle	8 episodes (season 4)
2022	National Treasure: Edge of History	Jess Valenzuela	Lead role
2024	FBI	Sydney Ortiz	Main role (season 7); 5 episodes
