= National Treasure (film) =

2004 film by Jon Turteltaub

- Theatrical release poster
- Directed by: Jon Turteltaub
- Screenplay by: Jim Kouf; Cormac Wibberley Marianne Wibberley
- Story by: Jim Kouf; Oren Aviv; Charles Segars
- Produced by: Jerry Bruckheimer; Jon Turteltaub
- Starring: Nicolas Cage; Harvey Keitel; Jon Voight; Diane Kruger; Sean Bean; Justin Bartha; Christopher Plummer
- Cinematography: Caleb Deschanel
- Edited by: William Goldenberg
- Music by: Trevor Rabin
- Production companies: Walt Disney Pictures; Jerry Bruckheimer Films; Junction Entertainment; Saturn Films
- Distributed by: Buena Vista Pictures Distribution
- Release date: November 19, 2004
- Running time: 131 minutes
- Country: United States
- Language: English
- Budget: $100 million
- Box office: $347.5 million

National Treasure is a 2004 action-adventure heist film released by Walt Disney Pictures. It was directed by Jon Turteltaub, written by Jim Kouf and the Wibberleys, and produced by Jerry Bruckheimer. It is the first film in the National Treasure franchise and stars Nicolas Cage in the lead role, Harvey Keitel, Jon Voight, Diane Kruger, Sean Bean, Justin Bartha and Christopher Plummer. In the film, Benjamin Franklin Gates, a historian, along with computer expert Riley Poole and archivist Abigail Chase, search for a massive lost Freemason treasure, which includes a map hidden on the back of the United States Declaration of Independence.

National Treasure was released worldwide on November 19, 2004. The film grossed $347 million worldwide and received mixed reviews from critics. A sequel, National Treasure: Book of Secrets, was released in 2007.

A sequel television series, National Treasure: Edge of History, premiered on the Disney+ streaming service in 2022.

== Plot ==
In 1974, a child named Benjamin Franklin Gates is told by his grandfather about a fabled treasure hidden in America. The treasure, passed down from ancient times to the Knights Templar, Founding Fathers, and Freemasons, has long been the obsession of the entire Gates family. In 1832, a dying Charles Carroll told their ancestor Thomas Gates about the treasure, leaving him with the cryptic phrase "the secret lies with Charlotte." While the story convinces Ben, his skeptical father, Patrick, dismisses it as nonsense.

Thirty years later, Ben is an American historian, cryptographer, and treasure hunter. He and his friend, computer expert Riley Poole, head an expedition financed by wealthy Englishman Ian Howe to find the Charlotte, revealed to be a ship found in the Arctic. Within the ship, they find a meerschaum pipe. Its engravings reveal the next clue is a map hidden on the back of the Declaration of Independence. When Ian reveals himself as a crime boss and suggests stealing the Declaration, a fight ensues, and the group splits. Ben and Riley report Ian's plan to the FBI, and to Dr. Abigail Chase of the National Archives and Records Administration, but are not believed. Ben decides to protect the Declaration by stealing it from the Archives' preservation room during a gala event before Ian does. Obtaining Abigail's fingerprints, he successfully acquires the Declaration, but is spotted by Ian's group just as they break in to steal it. Ben tries to leave via the gift shop but has to pay for the Declaration when the cashier mistakes it for a souvenir copy. Suspecting something amiss, Abigail confronts Ben and takes back the document. Ian promptly kidnaps her, but Ben and Riley rescue Abigail, tricking Ian by leaving behind a souvenir copy of the Declaration. The FBI, led by Special Agent Peter Sadusky, begins hunting Ben.

Fleeing to Patrick's house, the trio studies the Declaration and discovers a book cipher written in invisible ink. The message refers to Benjamin Franklin's Silence Dogood letters. Patrick formerly owned them but donated them to the Franklin Institute. Patrick scolds the trio for their naivete, believing the treasure was invented as a hoax by American revolutionaries to distract the British. He discovers their thievery of the Declaration and mourns his son's choices. Several hours later, the FBI discovers Patrick, tied to a chair by Ben, who has left for Philadelphia.

Paying a schoolboy to view the letters at the Institute and help them crack the cipher, Ben, Riley, and Abigail discover a message leading to Independence Hall's bell tower. Ian also pieces together the clue. At the tower, Ben cuts out a marked brick containing a pair of spectacles with multiple colored lenses, which, when used to read the back of the Declaration, reveal a clue pointing to Trinity Church. Ian's associates chase the trio through Philadelphia until the FBI arrests Ben. Abigail and Riley lose the Declaration to Ian, but Abigail convinces Ian to help them rescue Ben in exchange for the next clue. Ian agrees, contacts the FBI, and arranges a meeting at the USS Intrepid, where they help Ben escape the FBI.

Ian returns the Declaration and asks for the next clue, but when Ben remains coy, Ian reveals he has taken Patrick hostage. The group travels to the Trinity Church, where they find an underground passage that appears to lead to a dead end, lit by a lone lantern. Patrick claims it is a reference to the Midnight Ride of Paul Revere, pointing Ian to the Old North Church in Boston, a claim that Ben supports. Ian traps the group in the chamber and leaves for Boston. Ben and Patrick reveal they lied to get Ian out of the way, having anticipated his betrayal. Ben finds a secret door; however, they discover only an empty room. Despairing, Ben believes the treasure was moved or stolen, and that his quest has been in vain. Patrick encourages Ben to continue pursuing the treasure, having regained his faith in its existence.

Ben then finds a notch the meerschaum pipe from the Charlotte fits into and realizes the full meaning of the original clue: the pipe is also a key to open the real treasure room, which includes a staircase to the surface. Ben meets with Sadusky—himself a Freemason—at ground level to return the Declaration. In exchange for dropping the charges on him, Abigail, and Riley, Ben decides to donate the treasure to museums worldwide, crediting the Gates family and Riley for the discovery, and helps the FBI track down Ian. Ian and his henchmen are quickly arrested while breaking into the Old North Church in Boston.

Later, Ben and Abigail start a relationship, and Riley is somewhat upset that Ben turned down the 10% finder's fee for the treasure. However, the 1% he did accept has made them all wealthy, with Riley owning a brand new Ferrari 360, while Ben and Abigail enjoy each other's company at their new lavish mansion.

== Cast ==
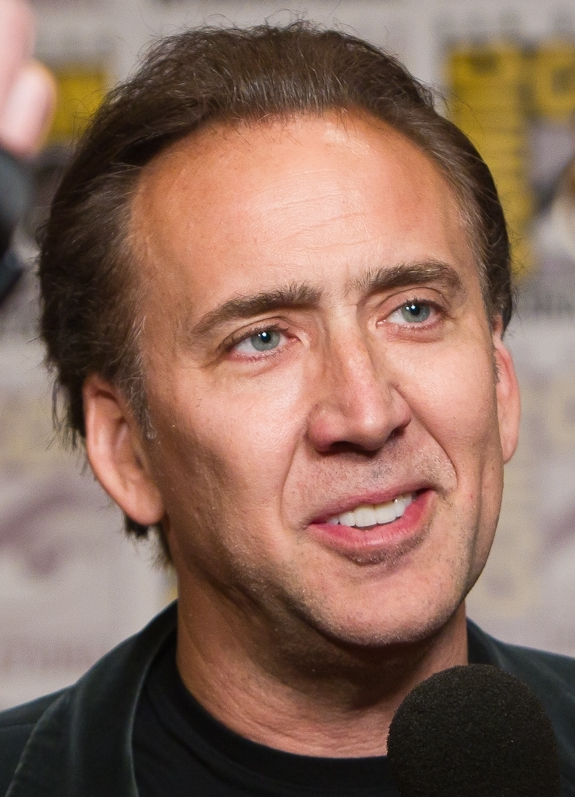
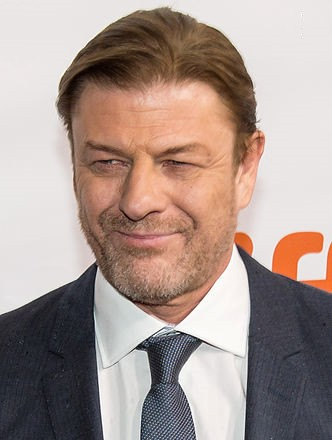
Nicolas Cage in 2011 (left) and Sean Bean in 2015
- Nicolas Cage as Benjamin Franklin Gates: An American treasure hunter and cryptographer.
  - Hunter Gomez as young Benjamin Gates
- Sean Bean as Ian Howe: An entrepreneur, crime boss and treasure hunter who is a former friend of Benjamin Gates.
- Diane Kruger as Dr. Abigail Chase: An archivist at the National Archives who aids Benjamin Gates in treasure hunting.
- Justin Bartha as Riley Poole: A sardonic computer expert and friend of Benjamin Gates.
- Jon Voight as Patrick Henry Gates: A former treasure hunter and the father of Benjamin Gates.
- Harvey Keitel as Agent Peter Sadusky: An FBI Special Agent in pursuit of the stolen Declaration of Independence.
- Christopher Plummer as John Adams Gates: The father of Patrick Gates and the grandfather of Benjamin Gates.

David Dayan Fisher appears as Shaw, Stewart Finlay-McLennan as Powell, Oleg Taktarov as Viktor Shippen, and Stephen Pope as Phil McGregor (Ian's henchmen); Annie Parisse, Mark Pellegrino, Armando Riesco, and Erik King play agents Dawes, Ted Johnson, Hendricks, and Colfax, respectively. Don McManus appears as Dr. Stan Herbert, Arabella Field appears as Abigail's secretary. Sharon Wilkins portrays a butcher. Jason Earles portrays Thomas Gates, and Terrence Currier portrays Founding Father Charles Carroll.

== Production ==
=== Development ===
By early 1999, it was revealed that Jon Turteltaub was developing National Treasure based on an idea developed by Oren Aviv and Charles Segars in 1997, with a script by Jim Kouf. By 2001, the project was relocated to Touchstone Pictures.

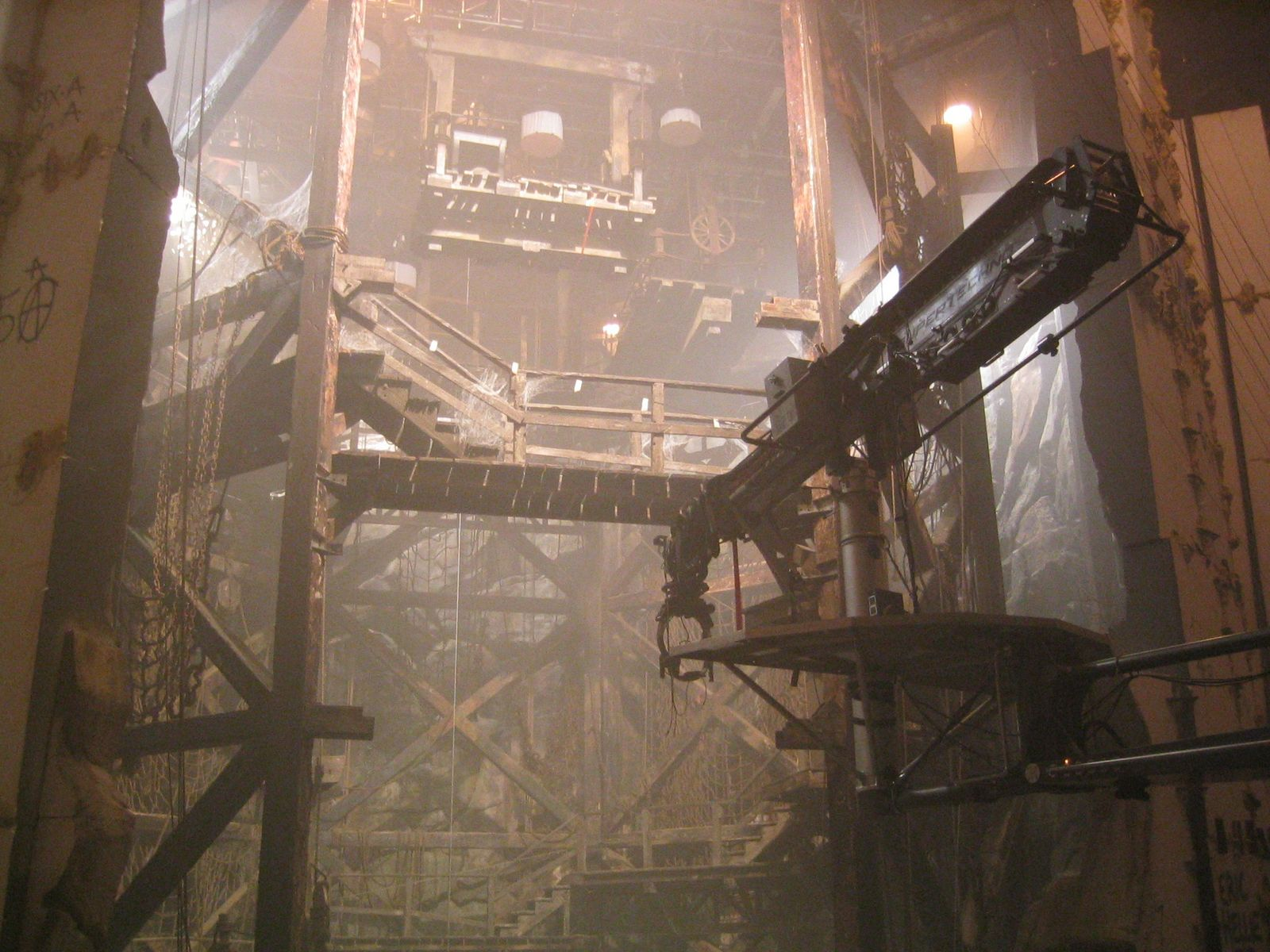
Film set for the underground chambers beneath Trinity Church

In May 2003, Nicolas Cage was cast as the lead. New drafts were written by nine scribers, including Cormac and Marianne Wibberley, E. Max Frye, and Jon Turteltaub. By October, Sean Bean was cast.

=== Filming locations ===
National Treasure was filmed primarily in Los Angeles, Washington, D.C., New York City, Philadelphia and Utah. Most scenes were filmed on location, with the exceptions of the Independence Hall scene, portions of which were filmed at the replica of Independence Hall at Knott's Berry Farm, and the Arctic scene, which was filmed in Utah.

== Soundtrack ==
National Treasure (Original Score)

Film score by Trevor Rabin
- Released: November 16, 2004
- Recorded: 2004
- Genres: Stage & screen
- Length: 38:45
- Label: Hollywood
- Producer: Trevor Rabin

Professional ratings
Review scores
Source	Rating
AllMusic	3/5 stars

All tracks are written by Trevor Rabin.

No.	Title	Length
1.	"National Treasure Suite"	3:17
2.	"Ben"	4:03
3.	"Finding Charlotte"	1:04
4.	"Library of Congress"	2:27
5.	"Preparation Montage"	4:53
6.	"Arrival at National Archives"	1:54
7.	"The Chase"	4:22
8.	"Declaration of Independence"	1:43
9.	"Foot Chase"	3:34
10.	"Spectacle Discovery"	3:18
11.	"Interrogation"	4:30
12.	"Treasure"	3:39
Total length:		38:45

== Portrayal of the Declaration of Independence ==
The film's suggestion that the original Declaration of Independence still has clearly visible ink is inaccurate. The document's ink faded over time due to exposure to damaging lighting, with little ink still existing by 1876. In addition, the U.S. National Archives released a video in 2019 that the Declaration of Independence does not contain a hidden treasure map. Instead, "Original Declaration of Independence, dated 4th July 1776" is written along the edge on the back, which served as identification of the document when it was rolled up and stored, as posted by the US National Archives Twitter in a tweet published July 4.

== Reception ==
=== Box office ===
National Treasure earned $11,119,073 on its opening day in the United States, and grossed $35,142,554 during its opening weekend in 3,243 theaters while averaging $11,648 per venue, ranking first ahead of The SpongeBob SquarePants Movie ($32 million). The film held on to the No. 1 spot for three weekends earning $32,156,917 and $17,004,967. In Japan, it bested the double-billing MegaMan NT Warrior: Program of Light and Dark and Duel Masters: Curse of the Deathphoenix by grossing $11,666,763 in its first week.

The film closed on June 2, 2005 with a final domestic gross of $173,008,894, covering its production budget of $100 million. With an additional $174,503,424 from its international release, National Treasure grossed over $347,512,318 worldwide, becoming the 12th highest-grossing film of 2004, and the 8th highest-grossing film in North America the same year.

=== Critical reception ===
On Rotten Tomatoes, the film has an approval rating of 47% based on 176 reviews, and an average rating of 5.30/10. The site's consensus reads, "National Treasure is no treasure, but it's a fun ride for those who can forgive its highly improbable plot." On Metacritic, the film has a score of 40 out of 100, based on 35 critics, indicating "mixed or average reviews". Audiences polled by CinemaScore gave the film an average grade of "A−" on an A+ to F scale.

Roger Ebert gave the film 2/4 stars, calling it "so silly that the Monty Python version could use the same screenplay, line for line." Academic David Bordwell has expressed a liking for the film, placing it in the tradition of 1950s Disney children's adventure movies, and using it as the basis for an essay on scene transitions in classical Hollywood cinema.

== Accolades ==
Year	Award	Category	Notes	Result
2005	BMI Film & TV Awards	BMI Film Music Award	BMI Film Music Award for Trevor Rabin	Won
2005	Academy of Science Fiction, Fantasy & Horror Films, USA	Saturn Award for Best Action/Adventure/Thriller Film		Nominated
2005	Academy of Science Fiction, Fantasy & Horror Films, USA	Saturn Award for Best Supporting Actress	Diane Kruger	Nominated
2005	Teen Choice Awards	Movie: Action/Adventure		Nominated
2005	Visual Effects Society Awards	Outstanding Models and Miniatures in a Motion Picture	Matthew Gratzner, Forest Fischer, Scott Beverly, and Leigh-Alexandra Jacob, for the treasure room	Nominated
2005	World Stunt Awards	Taurus Award for Best Overall Stunt by a Stunt Woman	Lisa Hoyle	Nominated
2005	Young Artist Awards	Best Family Feature Film: Drama		Nominated
2005	Young Artist Awards	Best Performance in a Feature Film, Supporting Young Actor	Hunter Gomez	Nominated

== Home media ==
National Treasure was released on Disney DVD in May 2005. In keeping with the movie's theme, the DVD contains a "Bonus Treasure Hunt": viewers who watch the Special Features on the disc are rewarded with puzzles and codes that unlock more features.

=== Collector's Edition DVD ===
To help promote Book of Secrets, a special collector's edition, two-disc DVD set of the movie was released on December 18, 2007. The set features a bonus disc containing additional deleted scenes and documentaries.

=== Blu-ray ===
Walt Disney Studios Home Entertainment released Blu-ray versions of National Treasure and its sequel, National Treasure 2: Book of Secrets, on May 20, 2008.

== Sequels ==
Although the DVD commentary stated that there were no plans for a sequel, the film's box office gross of an unexpected $347.5 million worldwide warranted a second film, which was given the green light in 2005. National Treasure: Book of Secrets was released on December 21, 2007.

In 2008, director Jon Turteltaub said that the filmmaking team would take its time on another National Treasure sequel. In October 2013, Turteltaub confirmed that he, the studio, producer Jerry Bruckheimer, and the actors all wanted to do a third film, saying: "We want to do the movie, Disney wants to do the movie. We're just having the damnedest time writing it. I'll bet that within two years, we'll be shooting that movie. I'd say we're about halfway there." In May 2016, Cage confirmed the film was still in the writing process, and in July 2018, Turtletaub reiterated that a script for a possible third film was "close", but Disney still was not completely sold on it. In January 2020, it was announced that Chris Bremner, the writer of Bad Boys for Life, would write a new script.

In May 2020, Jerry Bruckheimer confirmed that, not only was there a third film in development with the original cast returning, but also that a Disney+ series was in the works with the same premise as the original, but focusing on a much younger cast.

In an April 2022 "Ask Me Anything" thread on Reddit, Cage responded to a question about his involvement in possible future installments: "No, the priority was to turn it into a TV show so I would say probably not." However, in October 2025, Bruckheimer stated that the script for a third film is nearing completion and Cage is slated to reprise his role.

== See also ==
- Arnold Cipher
- Beale ciphers
