= We Need to Do Something =

2021 American film by Sean King O'Grady

- Theatrical release poster
- Directed by: Sean King O'Grady
- Written by: Max Booth III
- Based on: We Need to Do Something by Max Booth III
- Produced by: Peter Block; Max Booth III; Colin Duerr; Lauren Hantz; Ryan Lewis; Josh Malerman; Bill Stertz
- Starring: Sierra McCormick; Vinessa Shaw; Lisette Alexis; Pat Healy; John James Cronin; Ozzy Osbourne
- Cinematography: Jean-Philippe Bernier
- Edited by: Shane Patrick Ford
- Music by: David Chapdelaine
- Production companies: Atlas Industries; Spin a Black Yarn; IFC Nightmare
- Distributed by: IFC Films
- Release dates: June 2021 (Tribeca); September 3, 2021 (United States)
- Country: United States
- Language: English
- Box office: $13,589

We Need to Do Something is a 2021 American psychological horror thriller film directed by Sean King O'Grady and starring Sierra McCormick, Vinessa Shaw, Lisette Alexis, Pat Healy, and Ozzy Osbourne (In his final film role before his death in July 2025), who has a brief voice cameo. Based on the novella of the same name, the film centers on a family trapped in their bathroom during a tornado. The film was shot during the COVID-19 pandemic and is the first film production from Spin a Black Yarn Productions, with its co-founders Josh Malerman and Ryan Lewis serving as producers.

We Need to Do Something had its world premiere at the Tribeca Film Festival in June 2021, and was theatrically released by IFC Films on September 3, 2021. The film polarized critics upon release, who praised the film's characters, use of jump-scares, and McCormick's performance, however criticized its failure to "capture the actual psychological awfulness of being trapped too near your nearest and dearest, with no end in sight".

== Plot ==
During a tornado, teenager Melissa, her parents Robert and Diane, and her brother Bobby, gather in the bathroom.

A tree crashes through the house, blocking the door and trapping the family. They see a snake outside. Tensions rise as they await help. Alcoholic Robert becomes irate as he suffers withdrawal.

A dog appears outside, off screen. As the children pet it without looking, it proclaims in a male voice that it's a "good boy" and bites Melissa, who rips its tongue out by the root. Diane rinses off the tongue, and the family eats it.

Flashbacks show Melissa with her girlfriend, Amy. The pair are filmed kissing by Amy's stalker, Joe, and are frustrated by the gossip of bullies. Amy casts a spell on Joe, requiring Melissa to dig up the family dog in the backyard and take his tongue. Joe dies. Amy thinks the spell messed up because she had something inside her.

The snake reappears and bites Bobby. Off-screen, men enter the house and shoot or are shot by a monster. Bobby dies of the bite. Melissa tells her parents she and Amy caused the supernatural events with the failed spell.

Robert, delirious from withdrawal and alcoholic wipes, says they must eat Bobby. He answers a call on Melissa's phone and throws the phone back outside. He screams about witches and beats Diane with a snake. Melissa stabs him to death with a piece of mirror.

Diane breaks through the brick wall and leaves. Melissa wakes up and has a vision of Amy attacking her. Diane returns covered in blood. The two scream as something crashes in or just outside the bathroom.

== Cast ==
- Sierra McCormick as Melissa
- Vinessa Shaw as Diane
- Lisette Alexis as Amy
- Pat Healy as Robert
- John James Cronin as Bobby
- Ozzy Osbourne as the voice of Good Boy
- Logan Kearney as Joe

== Production ==
The film is based on a novella of the same name written by Max Booth III, who adapted his own work into a screenplay; the success of Booth's 2020 novel Touch the Night, published by Cemetery Dance, helped draw attention to the project. Although the novella and screenplay were completed prior to the COVID-19 outbreak, director Sean King O'Grady found resonance in the story with America's response to the pandemic, saying "Without directly addressing the nightmare we are currently living through, Max created a hellish allegory that still manages to capture the collective trauma we’re all experiencing."

The film was shot entirely on a soundstage in Michigan owned by production company Atlas Industries over the course of four weeks between September and October 2020; production took place in secret, with no announcements about cast or crew until filming had already wrapped. Owing to the ongoing COVID-19 pandemic, extra precautions had to be taken, including a minimal number of crewmembers.

== Reception ==
=== Critical response ===
On the review aggregator website Rotten Tomatoes, 54% of 57 critics' reviews are positive. The website's consensus reads: "While We Need to Do Something can feel as unfocused as its title, it offers eerily timely genre chills, soaked in claustrophobic dread." Metacritic, which uses a weighted average, assigned the film a score of 48 out of 100, based on 11 critics, indicating "mixed or average" reviews.

Meagan Navarro of Bloody Disgusting gave the film a score of 2.5/5, writing that it "asks its audience to use their imagination for much of the horrors that barrage its characters, as its story is told solely within the confines of a single room", but stated that it "isn't interested in offering any definitive answers, only suggesting mere possibilities." Jessica Kiang of Variety said that the film "fails to capture the actual psychological awfulness of being trapped to near your nearest and dearest, with no end in sight", and added: "When, late in the film, a phone's "Puttin' on the Ritz" ringtone sounds out, it's hard to escape the suspicion we've been Rickrolled."

Amidst the mixed reception, McCormick's performance was lauded, with some critics deeming it a highlight of the film. Weekly magazine Chicago Reader described the actress as "captivating", and IGN praised her take on the character, stating that she "brings wide eyes and a sulking snarl to teen daughter Melissa, whose internal drama is signaled by a goth wardrobe topped by a bubblegum pink wig."
