= Common Law (2012 TV series) =

American comedy-drama television series

- Genre: Comedy drama
- Created by: The Wibberleys
- Starring: Michael Ealy; Warren Kole; Sonya Walger; Jack McGee
- Country of origin: United States
- Original language: English
- No. of seasons: 1
- No. of episodes: 12

Production
- Executive producers: Cormac Wibberley; Craig Sweeny; Dan Shotz; Jon Turteltaub; Karim Zreik; Marianne Wibberley
- Running time: 43 minutes
- Production companies: CBS Television Studios; Junction Entertainment

Original release
- Network: USA Network
- Release: May 11 – August 10, 2012

Common Law is an American comedy-drama television series, which ran on USA Network from May 11 to August 10, 2012, and stars Michael Ealy and Warren Kole as two Los Angeles Police Department detectives who can't stand each other and are ordered to see a couples therapist to remedy the situation.

The series was created by Cormac and Marianne Wibberley and was produced by CBS Television Studios and Junction Entertainment. While originally planned to premiere on January 26, 2012, the series was pushed back until summer 2012. The series premiered following Fairly Legal on Friday, May 11, 2012. The show was canceled by the USA Network after one season and 12 episodes on October 31, 2012, due to low ratings.

== Synopsis ==
The series follows two Los Angeles Police Department homicide detectives, Travis Marks and Wes Mitchell, who can't stand each other. The constant bickering between the two partners prompts their commanding officer, Captain Mike Sutton, to send them to a couples therapist, Dr. Emma Ryan, in hopes of resolving the situation.

== Cast and characters ==
=== Main ===
- Michael Ealy as Travis Marks, a foster-raised LAPD detective assigned to the Robbery-Homicide Division. Travis is a womanizer who is known for dating women at work. Having grown up in a series of foster homes, Travis has several foster brothers and one of them calls him T-Bone.
- Warren Kole as Wesley "Wes" Mitchell, lawyer turned LAPD homicide detective and Travis' partner. After an incident in which Wes pulled his gun on Travis on the job, the two are assigned to couples therapy. Wes initially had a career as a lawyer before becoming a detective and is currently divorced.
- Sonya Walger as Dr. Emma Ryan, Travis Marks and Wes Mitchell's couples therapist. She is also friends with Capt. Sutton, who came to her for couples therapy as well.
- Jack McGee as Mike Sutton, a captain with the LAPD. He is Travis and Wes' commanding officer, who tells the duo to attend therapy sessions, after an incident in which Wes pulls his gun on Travis, without any given explanation.

=== Recurring ===
- Elizabeth Chomko as Alex MacFarland Mitchell, Wes's ex-wife. She is known to have a close friendship with Travis, and has reminded Wes that the law firm he previously worked for would like to have him return.
- Alicia Coppola as Jonelle, a forensic pathologist working for the Los Angeles County Coroner's Office who formerly dated Travis.

== Development and production ==
On June 9, 2010, USA Network placed a cast-contingent pilot order for Common Law. Cormac Wibberley and Marianne Wibberley wrote the pilot, Jon Turteltaub was attached to the project as the director, with Turteltaub, Cormac Wibberley, Marianne Wibberley, Dan Shotz and Karim Zreik serving as executive producers.

Casting announcements began in August 2010, with Michael Ealy first to be cast. Ealy portrays Travis Marks, "a maverick ladies' man who served time in juvie." Next to join the series was Warren Kole as Wes Mitchell, Travis Marks' partner, "a methodical former lawyer with a passion for cars, gardening and his ex-wife." Amy Acker was next to be cast as Dr. Elyse Ryan, the couples therapist treating Marks and Mitchell. Jack McGee, was the last actor to join the main cast, playing Captain Mike Sutton, Marks and Mitchell's commanding officer in the LAPD. Alicia Coppola was later cast in a recurring role as "a pathologist who has a history with Travis Marks."

In June 2011, it was reported that USA Network was close to picking up Common Law to series. The proposed pick up was to come with a number of creative changes to the show, which included adding more action and re-casting the role of Dr. Elyse Ryan, which had been played by Acker in the pilot; the character's name was also changed to Emma.

On July 6, 2011, USA Network green-lighted the series with an order of 11 episodes to air in the summer of 2012. Filming of the series was expected to begin in August 2011. The series is produced by CBS Television Studios and Junction Entertainment. Along with the series pickup, the network also announced that Craig Sweeny had been picked to join the series as an executive producer. By November 29, 2011, the premiere had been moved to January 26, 2012. The series was once again pushed back to summer 2012, with the premiere date eventually settling on May 11, 2012.

On October 14, 2011, the show began filming in New Orleans, Louisiana.

== Episodes ==
No.	Title	Directed by	Written by	Original release date	Prod. code	US viewers (millions)
1	"Pilot"	Jon Turteltaub	The Wibberleys	May 11, 2012	101	2.48
Police detectives Travis Marks (Michael Ealy) and Wes Mitchell (Warren Kole) are sent by their captain (Jack McGee) to a therapist (Sonya Walger) to settle their differences in couple's counseling. Meanwhile, they investigate the murder of the son of a federal judge.
2	"Ride-Along"	Dermott Downs	The Wibberleys	May 18, 2012	102	2.51
After a woman falls over the balcony of a honeymoon suite, Travis and Wes are sent to investigate. Dr. Ryan accompanies the two partners as they look into the apparent suicide.
3	"Soul Mates"	Aaron Lipstadt	Pamela Davis	June 1, 2012	103	2.29
After a woman is murdered, Wes and Travis look into a dating site. Wes realizes that his ex-wife has begun using the site as well.
4	"Ex-Factor"	Mel Damski	Matt Ward	June 8, 2012	104	2.31
A rift is opened when Travis' ex-partner returns.
5	"The T Word"	John Scott	Douglas Petrie & Tim Talbott	June 15, 2012	105	2.21
Travis and Wes investigate various home invasions. It is soon discovered that one of Travis' foster brothers may be involved.
6	"Performance Anxiety"	Larry Teng	Craig Sweeny	June 22, 2012	106	2.17
Wes and Travis are in an anxiety about their performance. They are also on the hunt for the copycats of Bonnie and Clyde.
7	"Role Play"	Marc Roskin	Jeff Lowell	June 29, 2012	107	1.97
In therapy, Wes and Travis are given the exercise of "role play" by Dr. Ryan. Although living in each other's shoes tests their partnership more than usual, it ultimately leads to them solving the case of a woman who was strangled to death.
8	"Joint Custody"	Stephen Surjik	Craig Sweeny & Matt Ward	July 13, 2012	108	2.07
Officer Randi gets shot and hands over her dog, Hudson, to Wes and Travis to catch the shooter with Hudson being the only eye witness.
9	"Odd Couples"	Mike Smith	Jeff Lowell	July 20, 2012	109	1.82
Wes and Travis go on a stakeout and have to survive living in the same apartment until the investigation is over.
10	"In-Laws vs. Outlaws"	Stephen Surjik	Tim Talbott	July 27, 2012	110	1.76
Wes and Travis' old mentors (Kevin Tighe and Jeff Fahey) become interested in their case. Wes and Travis see what could be the future them.
11	"Hot for Teacher"	Seith Mann	Craig Sweeny & John McNamara	August 3, 2012	111	1.79
Wes is disturbed by an erotic dream about Dr. Ryan. Meanwhile, Dr. Ryan's fiancé is attacked and much to her dismay, Wes and Travis look into the case.
12	"Gun!"	John Behring	Craig Sweeny	August 10, 2012	112	2.04
Wes and Travis explain why they go to therapy.

== Ratings ==
Season	Timeslot (ET)	# Ep.	Premiered		Ended		TV Season	Viewers (in millions)
Season	Timeslot (ET)	# Ep.	Date	Premiere Viewers (in millions)	Date	Finale Viewers (in millions)	TV Season	Viewers (in millions)
1	Friday 10:00 pm	12	May 11, 2012	2.48	August 10, 2012	2.04	2012	TBA
