= Cormac and Marianne Wibberley =

American husband-and-wife screenwriter duo

Cormac Wibberley
- Born: October 28, 1959 (age 65); California, United States
- Occupations: Screenwriter; film producer
- Spouse: Marianne Wibberley
- Parent: Leonard Wibberley

Marianne Wibberley
- Born: June 12, 1965 (age 60); California, United States
- Occupations: Screenwriter; film producer
- Spouse: Cormac Wibberley

Cormac Wibberley and Marianne Wibberley (also known as The Wibberleys) are an American husband and wife screenwriting team. They have been writing together since 1991, and made their first screenplay sale in 1993. Cormac's father was Leonard Wibberley, author of The Mouse That Roared, among other books.

== Biography ==
The pair grew up in Southern California, where they attended Mira Costa High School. Both went on to attend UCLA as undergraduates, with Marianne staying at UCLA for graduate work at the film school. They currently live in the South Bay, Los Angeles area with their daughter.

They have been credited writers on films including National Treasure, I Spy, The 6th Day and Charlie's Angels: Full Throttle.

They have taught screenwriting at UCLA.

== Filmography ==
Film writers

- The 6th Day (2000)
- I Spy (2002)
- Charlie's Angels: Full Throttle (2003)
- Bad Boys II (2003) (Story only)
- National Treasure (2004)
- The Shaggy Dog (2006)
- National Treasure: Book of Secrets (2007)
- G-Force (2009)

Television

Year	Title	Writers	Creators	Executive Producers
2012	Common Law	Yes	Yes	Yes
2022	National Treasure: Edge of History	Yes	Yes	Yes

== See also ==
- Michael Hemschoot
- Worker Studio
