= Hunter Gomez =

American actor (born 1991)

- Born: December 20, 1991 (age 34); Mesa, Arizona
- Education: Arizona State University; George Washington University
- Occupations: Actor, political consultant
- Years active: 2003–2018; 2024–present

Hunter Gomez (born December 20, 1991) is an American actor. He is most widely recognized for his work in films and guest appearances in American television.

== Career ==
Gomez was born in Mesa, Arizona, and is the youngest of six children. His parents Ernesto Gomez and Linda Gomez were "Arizona Parents of the Year" in 2006 and in 2007. They were honored as "National Parents of the Year" by the National Parents' Day Coalition.

Gomez began his entertainment career in 2003 at age 12. He has worked with actors including Nicolas Cage, Jon Voight, Christopher Plummer, Jessica Simpson, Jennifer Love Hewitt, James Belushi, Robert Picardo, Seth MacFarlane, Jodie Sweetin, David Henrie, and Sam Heughan.

Gomez got his start playing the younger version of Nicolas Cage's character Benjamin Franklin Gates in the 2004 Disney film National Treasure. Gomez also portrayed the younger versions of Arnold Schwarzenegger, Justin Timberlake, Luke Wilson, Goose Gossage, and Hugh Harman's characters in films and on television.

Gomez's films include Last Ounce of Courage, where he played the lead role as the grandson of a man grieving over his son's death. The film was released in 2012. Gomez played Hugh Harman in Walt Before Mickey produced by Arthur L. Bernstein and Armando Gutierrez. In 2015, Gomez completed When the Starlight Ends starring Sam Heughan. In 2018, he played Johnny Boy in The Little Mermaid, which initially marked his final film role before ending his acting career to focus on becoming a communications director. However, in 2024, it was reported that Gomez would return to acting and had been cast in an undisclosed role in the upcoming TV series A Motel.

His TV appearances include episodes of The Tonight Show with Jay Leno, According to Jim, Ned's Declassified School Survival Guide, The John Henson Project, The Nick and Jessica Variety Hour, The Suite Life of Zack & Cody and Ghost Whisperer. He voiced several characters on Family Guy.

== Education ==
Gomez finished his undergraduate degree at Arizona State University in 2014. He later studied at George Washington University in Washington, DC, where he also worked as a political consultant.

== Philanthropy ==
Gomez founded the Gomez Family Food drive which raised over 130,000 pounds of food for local food banks. He sponsored two students through Compassion International.

For his 18th birthday, Gomez organized a soccer match called "The Children's Cup" that took place at the Scottsdale Sports Complex. All proceeds went to the charity HopeKids.

He was involved in politics both on a local and national level. In one of his first press conferences at the Capitol with Rick Schroder, Gomez spoke in hopes of getting a bill passed to offer incentives to film makers.
