= National Treasure: Edge of History =

2022 American action-adventure television series

- Genre: Action-adventure
- Created by: Cormac and Marianne Wibberley
- Based on: Characters by: Jim Kouf; Oren Aviv; Charles Segars
- Starring: Lisette Olivera; Zuri Reed; Antonio Cipriano; Jordan Rodrigues; Jake Austin Walker; Catherine Zeta-Jones; Lyndon Smith
- Music by: Trevor Rabin
- Country of origin: United States
- Original language: English
- No. of seasons: 1
- No. of episodes: 10

Production
- Executive producers: Jon Turteltaub; Rick Muirragui; Mira Nair; Marianne and Cormac Wibberley; KristieAnne Reed; Jonathan Littman; Jerry Bruckheimer
- Producers: Joan Cunningham; Jeremy Beim; Dwain Worrell
- Production locations: Baton Rouge, Louisiana; Santa Fe, New Mexico
- Cinematography: Declan Quinn; Tom Camarda; Abraham Martínez
- Editors: Matt Maddox; Ray Daniels; Louis Bravo; Barrie Wise; Susana Benaim
- Running time: 41–48 minutes
- Production companies: Jerry Bruckheimer Television; ABC Signature

Original release
- Network: Disney+
- Release: December 14, 2022 – February 8, 2023

Related
- National Treasure

National Treasure: Edge of History is an American action-adventure television series developed for and globally released on the streaming service Disney+. It is based on, and a continuation of, the National Treasure franchise. It was produced by Jerry Bruckheimer Television and ABC Signature. The series stars Lisette Olivera, with Catherine Zeta-Jones as the apparent lead antagonist, and with Justin Bartha reprising his role from the films as a recurring character, while Harvey Keitel appears in the beginning, also reprising his film role. Mira Nair directed the pilot episode. The show primarily filmed in Baton Rouge, Louisiana, and Santa Fe, New Mexico, and premiered on December 14, 2022.

National Treasure: Edge of History received generally mixed reviews from critics. It was among the ten most-streamed original programs in the U.S. from its first week, before it reached the top 5 in its later weeks. In April 2023, the series was canceled after one season.

== Cast ==
=== Main ===
- Lisette Olivera as Jesusita “Jess” Valenzuela, a young DACA woman living in Baton Rouge who finds out that her dead father is part of a secret network of treasure protectors; later Liam's love interest.
- Zuri Reed as Tasha Rivers, Jess' roommate and best friend
- Antonio Cipriano as Oren Bradley, another friend, roommate of Ethan, and sneakerhead; Tasha's on-and-off boyfriend
- Jordan Rodrigues as Ethan Chao, Jess' oldest friend who has feelings for her; Oren's roommate
- Jake Austin Walker as Liam Sadusky, musician and bar worker, Peter Sadusky's grandson; later Jess's love interest
- Catherine Zeta-Jones as Billie Pearce, a wealthy and ruthless black market antiquities dealer
- Lyndon Smith as Agent Ross, an FBI agent who recently transferred to the Bureau's Baton Rouge field office. It is later revealed her full name is Hannah Betsy Ross.

=== Special guest stars ===
- Harvey Keitel as Peter Sadusky, a reclusive former FBI agent and master Freemason suffering from dementia. Keitel reprises his role from the National Treasure films.
- Justin Bartha as Riley Poole, a computer expert and good friend of Ben Gates from both films. Bartha reprises his role from the films.

=== Recurring ===
- Breeda Wool as Kacey Hasler, one of Billie's mercenaries
- Dustin Ingram as Myles Moro, Peter's former nurse
- Salena Qureshi as Meena Mishra, Ethan's love interest
- Darri Ingolfsson as Dario, another one of Billie's mercenaries
- Armando Riesco as Agent Hendricks, Agent Ross's boss and Peter Sadusky's former partner and friend. Riesco reprises his role from the films.
- Tommy Savas as Dr. Zeke Hudson, a coroner at the city morgue who is interested in Agent Ross romantically
- Joseph D. Reitman as The Bearded Man, a man who follows Jess and her friends
- Jacob Vargas as Rafael, Jess's father

== Episodes ==
No.	Title	Directed by	Written by	Original release date
1	"I'm a Ghost"	Mira Nair	Cormac and Marianne Wibberley	December 14, 2022
In 2001, a treasure hunter named Rafael Rios recovers a hidden artifact and sends his family into hiding, before he is killed by a man named Salazar in Mexico. In present day, Rafael's daughter, Jess, is living in Baton Rouge, Louisiana, as a DACA resident, with her friend Tasha, while two other friends, Oren, and Ethan, live nearby. While working at a storage facility, Jess finds Peter Sadusky's locker, and goes to meet him. Sadusky notices Jess' necklace, and gives her a letter and photo addressed to his estranged grandson, Liam. While Liam refuses the letter, a woman named Billie sends fake FBI agents to retrieve it, but they are unsuccessful. Jess and Tasha decode the photo, and find a puzzle box in Sadusky's Freemason lodge, which contains a symbol matching Jess' necklace. Shortly after, Billie contacts Jess and Tasha, revealing that she has Oren hostage. Meanwhile, in Mexico City, Salazar is shown in prison, drawing the same symbol on a piece of paper.
2	"The Treasure Map"	Nathan Hope	Rick Muirragui	December 14, 2022
Jess and Billie agree to meet at the USS Kidd museum gift shop to exchange the box for Oren. Before they go, Jess and Tasha go to the FBI to report Oren's kidnapping, but Tasha doesn't want them to use their real names. A new FBI agent, Ross, takes their info, but Jess hesitates and decides not to file the kidnapping report. On the way to the museum, Jess solves the puzzle box, and find that the inside pieces have parts of a map drawn on them. Jess and Tasha take photos of the map pieces before restoring the box. At the museum gift shop, Jess hides a keychain in the puzzle box, and tries to frame Billie for shoplifting. Unfortunately, she gets away scot-free. Meanwhile, Liam finds out Peter gave him the entire house in his Will, forcing him to stay in Louisiana until the house is sold, instead of moving to Tennessee to start his music career. Jess meets Liam again, and Liam decides to show her a hidden room in Peter's house, containing a paper written by Jess' mother. Meanwhile, Billie analyzes the puzzle box, and finds the keychain, now knowing that Jess was able to solve it.
3	"Graceland Gambit"	Monica Raymund	Gabriel Llanas	December 21, 2022
Jess and Liam find a video of Jess' mom, telling the story of La Malinche. While La Malinche was known as a translator for Hernan Cortes, she founded a secret society known as the Daughters of the Plumed Serpent, who wear the same symbol as Jess' necklace and hid treasure from the Spanish Inquisition. The group learn there are three puzzle boxes that lead to the treasure: Jade, Obsidian and Lapis lazuli. The group find a clue in Sadusky's room, relating to a clue about a dove and Elvis Presley. The group head to Graceland, having learned that there is a secret basement with Elvis memorabilia that has never been displayed. There, as Liam performs to distract security, Jess sneaks into the basement and finds an audio clue by Elvis on a gold record of "La Paloma". Meanwhile, Billie and her henchmen solve the Obsidian box, and already have the Jade box. A clue on the boxes leads them to Iztaccihuatl, only for Billie to realize too late that it's a trap, leading to the death of one of her henchmen, Nate. As Billie and Kacey mourn their loss, Billie acquires a copy of Jess' audio clue.
4	"Charlotte"	Antonio Negret	Cormac and Marianne Wibberley	December 28, 2022
Billie reports to a board of directors, who doubt if she is up to the task of collecting the treasure. Their doubts are dispelled when she shares with them Elvis Presley's audio clue. Meanwhile, with no luck at deciphering the clue, Jess and her friends go to Sadusky's wake, where Agents Ross and Hendricks are attending, as well as Riley Poole. Jess and her friends ask Riley for help on the clue, while Ross, who suspects Sadusky was poisoned, records plants and medicines in Sadusky's office. Ethan notices an old man in a brown car, who was following them in Tennessee, also appeared at the wake, but Ethan scares him off and lets the team know. Later, Riley accidentally triggers a deadly security system in Sadusky's clue room and gets locked inside with Jess. The duo nearly suffocate, but they crack the security code and escape, then deduce that the clue relates to Sacagawea and a journal in the Louisiana Governor's Mansion. After the wake, Liam and Jess kiss. Riley gets a call from Ben and warns Jess that someone else has a copy of Elvis' audio clue. Jess immediately suspects Liam.
5	"Bad Romance"	Laura Belsey	Sasha Stroman	January 4, 2023
Jess and Ethan sneak to the governor's mansion, hiding from Liam, who learns that the Journal will be displayed during the governor's ball. Jess confronts Liam about Billie getting the clue, upsetting Liam. Tasha finds a bug in Oren's shoes planted by Billie and plays a YouTube video of Oren. Jess apologizes to Liam, and they make up. The team, with Ethan's girlfriend, Meena, go to the ball. At the FBI office, Agent Ross confirms that Sadusky was poisoned the night he died. Meanwhile, Billie's team works on the audio clue, and think it refers to a journal written by Hernan Cortes. Unfortunately, the journal Billie finds is fake. Billie's team deduce that Jess' team found the bug when they match the audio to Oren's video, and also figure out they're going to the governor's ball. Billie also notices Jess in Oren's video wearing Rafael Rios' necklace. At the ball, Jess and Ethan dance, sparking feelings of jealousy from Liam and Meena. Jess tries to find Liam, but catches him stealing the journal, and he escapes before a guard notices the journal missing and suspects Jess, who runs from the ball, and as the police arrive, Billie helps her escape.
6	"Frenemies"	Kevin Alejandro	John-Paul Nickel	January 11, 2023
Billie tries to convince Jess that they are on the same side, and that she bought Lewis' journal from Liam. Jess goes to Liam's house to find it ransacked. The Bearded Man attacks Jess, whom Kacey rescues. Jess solves the journal's clue, leading to the Alamo's well in Texas. Jess, Billie, and Kacey plan to search the well for the third box during a battle re-enactment. Meanwhile, Ethan and Meena break up amicably. Ethan later finds Liam brutally injured. Liam says that he stole the journal when he saw Billie at the ball but Kacey ambushed him. During the re-enactment, Jess, having deduced that Billie was tricking her, traps her in the well before getting rescued by Oren and Tasha. Jess says that the Alamo Well clue does not refer to the well in Texas, but a bank in Mexico, which was broken into by Salazar, now in a Mexican prison. Jess decides that she needs to meet Salazar in-person. Agent Ross investigates the gift shop incident and tries to discover who Billie is. After Billie gets arrested, Kacey contacts Myles, Sadusky's caretaker, to give a flash drive to the FBI, which contains evidence to frame Jess for murdering Sadusky.
7	"Point of No Return"	Sherwin Shilati	Paola Villegas Soruco	January 18, 2023
Myles' drive contains a falsified recording of Jess poisoning Sadusky. Hendricks tells Ross to arrest Jess. Jess and Tasha see the FBI raiding their apartment and learn that Billie has framed Jess for Sadusky's murder. They go to Owen and Ethan's place to pack for Mexico. Ethan tells Jess about Liam and goes to the FBI to plead Jess' case. There, he hears the recording, and notices that "Jess" makes a grammatical error that Jess would be unlikely to say, but Billie would. Liam is unable to contact Jess. However, his boss pays him to sing at the bar, as his performance at Graceland went viral and brought a large crowd. After performing, he finds Myles, who was with Kacey. Myles offers to help find Jess, but Liam is reluctant to trust him. Jess finds out that Salazar is actually her father, Rafael, and that the police thought he was Salazar when he was arrested. Rafael gives her a clue, leading to a convent. There, Jess and the others find the Lapis box. With all three boxes, they assemble the map, but don't understand it. Jess decides to meet with her father again, only to see Billie. Worried about her father's fate, Jess decides to break him out of prison.
8	"Prison Break"	Sherwin Shilati	Dwain Worrell	January 25, 2023
Billie recognizes "Salazar" as Rafael, whom she blames for her brother's death. Jess' friends plan to break her into prison. Oren, worried about the consequences, decides to return to Louisiana. Once back home, Ross tries to ask Oren about Jess' whereabouts, to no avail. Ross then notices a Mexican airport sticker on Oren's luggage. Jess breaks into Rafael's cell. Jess and Rafael barely escape, due to the prison's sniper being shot. Tasha and Ethan drop Jess and Rafael, before being apprehended by the FBI after crossing the border. Meanwhile, Myles and Liam get Dario's phone to find Jess via Billie's trackers. Myles finds a tracker that places Billie in Mexico. Liam notices that Billie was tracking his dad. Noticing that "Dario" is using the tracking software, Billie calls Dario's phone. Liam answers in anger, now knowing that Billie is responsible for his father's death. Billie sends henchmen to Liam's house. Myles is fatally wounded, but Liam escapes. Jess shows Rafael the map, who explains that it is a Star Map, leading to the Devil's Swamp. Billie and Kacey kill the Bearded Man, and capture Jess and Rafael, thanks to trackers in Rafael's shoes.
9	"A Meeting with Salazar"	Brad Tanenbaum	Diya Mishra and Maura Milan	February 1, 2023
Jess, having smuggled Ethan's phone aboard Billie's plane, tries to get an SOS out to her friends. While on the plane, Billie figures out that Rafael's necklace is actually a special compass for navigating the Devil's Swamp. At FBI HQ, Oren submits to a polygraph test and Liam informs Ross about Myles' death. Ross tries to interrogate Tasha & Ethan, but when Tasha stays silent, she lets them go. Meena informs Ethan about the SOS, leading her friends to Jess & Billie heading to the Devil's Swamp. Liam shows Oren a book from his grandpa with a note: "Cras Est Nostrum". From the book, they find that Sadusky left him a message: Cras Est Nostrum is a group of Treasure destroyers; Billie is a member, and Salazar is its leader. Meanwhile, Ross discusses the case with Hudson. They go to Sadusky's house, where they encounter Dario. Ross gets a video of Billie's plane landing, and she and Hendricks investigate. There, Ross realizes that Hendricks poisoned Sadusky, and cuffs him. Ross heads to the Devil's Swamp alone to arrest Billie. However, Hendricks, having escaped, mortally wounds her with a sword. Rafael recognizes Hendricks as Salazar, who killed Billie's brother.
10	"Treasure Protectors"	Nathan Hope	Story by : Gabriel Llanas; Teleplay by : Rick Muirragui	February 8, 2023
As the Cras Est Nostrum group take Jess and Rafael through the Devil's Swamp, Tasha and Oren try to get Ross medical help. Hudson calls Ross' phone, and guides Tasha to stabilize her while Oren calls an ambulance and search party. Liam and Ethan use a spare boat to catch up to Cras Est Nostrum. While navigating through the jungle, Jess and Rafael trick Billie's men into activating a trap, resulting in two of them dying and Kacey getting shot in the leg. Seeing her as too much of a liability, Hendricks kills Kacey. Realizing that Hendricks killed her brother for the same reason, Billie kills him and declares herself Salazar. During the chaos, Jess and Rafael escape, meeting Ethan and Liam. Ethan decides to head back to alert the authorities, while Liam joins Jess and Rafael to find the treasure. The three find a hidden entrance into a temple, leading to the treasure. Billie blows up the entrance to get in and tries to burn evidence of Malinche, but is stopped by Ethan. Billie is arrested, while Jess and her friends celebrate. Everyone later attends the opening of an exhibit displaying the Pan-American treasure and validating Jess' mother. Liam reveals that he found a cassette left by his grandfather which mentions another treasure.

== Production ==
=== Development ===
In early May 2020, Jerry Bruckheimer revealed in an interview with Collider that a National Treasure television series was in the works for Disney+. The series would follow the same concept as the films with a younger cast. The script for the pilot was completed, with plotting for the story continued for the rest of the episodes. In March 2021, Disney officially greenlit the series. The title of the show was revealed in July 2022, ahead of its panel at San Diego Comic-Con.

=== Casting ===
In October 2021, Lisette Olivera, a Latina actress from L.A. previously acting under the name Lisette Alexís, was cast in the lead role. In January 2022, Zuri Reed, Jake Austin Walker, Antonio Cipriano, Jordan Rodrigues and Lyndon Smith were added to the cast, with Catherine Zeta-Jones joining the next month. In April 2022, Justin Bartha joined the series as a recurring guest star to reprise his role from the films. On July 21, 2022, during San Diego Comic-Con, it was revealed that Harvey Keitel would also be reprising his role, as Peter Sadusky, the lead FBI agent from the first two movies.

=== Filming ===
Principal photography began on February 12, 2022, in Baton Rouge. Filming moved to Santa Fe, New Mexico, in late June.

=== Music ===
National Treasure: Edge of History (Original Series Soundtrack)
No.	Title	Music	Performer(s)	Length
1.	"Main Title"	Trevor Rabin		1:41
2.	"Church Heist"	Trevor Rabin		0:44
3.	"Escape Room"	Paul Linford		2:06
4.	"Masonic Temple"	Trevor Rabin		3:08
5.	"Hidden Artwork"	Paul Linford		1:28
6.	"Be Brave"		Jake Austin Walker	3:07
7.	"Duerme Descansa"	Trevor Rabin		1:10
8.	"Trade Oren for Relic"	Paul Linford		2:03
9.	"Puzzle Box"	Trevor Rabin		2:06
10.	"Gift Shop Trap"	Paul Linford		2:44
11.	"Searching Sudusky's Study"	Trevor Rabin		2:25
12.	"Hey Dreamer"		Jake Austin Walker	2:02
13.	"Mom Knew About Treasure"	Trevor Rabin		3:42
14.	"Cracking the Box"	Trevor Rabin		1:29
15.	"Real Exterminators"	Paul Linford		2:18
16.	"La Paloma Clue"	Paul Linford		4:01
17.	"Suspicious Minds"		Jake Austin Walker	3:42
18.	"Oxygen Level 40%"	Trevor Rabin		6:19
19.	"I Miss That Van"		Jake Austin Walker	2:35
20.	"Shame on Me"		Jake Austin Walker	2:53
21.	"Charge!"	Trevor Rabin		2:16
22.	"Jess Meets Salazar"	Paul Linford		3:11
23.	"Organ Clue"	Trevor Rabin		3:59
24.	"Beside Me, Besides You"		Jake Austin Walker	3:05
25.	"Run! – Escape Pt. 3"	Trevor Rabin		2:38
26.	"Let's Find Out"	Trevor Rabin and Paul Linford		3:21
27.	"Salazar"	Paul Linford		1:55
28.	"Which Way"	Trevor Rabin		2:37
29.	"The Great Treasure"	Trevor Rabin		5:29
30.	"Another Treasure"	Trevor Rabin		1:00
Total length:				1:21:00

== Release ==
The trailer of National Treasure: Edge of History was released in September 2022. The series premiered December 14, 2022, on Disney+, with its first two episodes available immediately. It consists of ten episodes, with each one released weekly on Wednesdays, culminating in the finale on February 8, 2023. On April 21, 2023, Disney+ canceled the series after one season.

== Reception ==
=== Viewership ===
According to market research company Parrot Analytics, which looks at consumer engagement in consumer research, streaming, downloads, and on social media, National Treasure: Edge of History saw a significant increase in demand, rising to eighth place among the most in-demand new shows for the week of January 14-20, 2023, with 16.5 times the average series demand. This marked a 29% increase from the previous week, following the airing of its seventh episode on January 18. It later saw a 5% increase in demand from January 31 to February 3, 2023. The series climbed to sixth place in the rankings, with demand 16 times higher than the average series. This boost in demand occurred following the release of its penultimate episode on February 1. As the series approached its finale, further increases in demand were anticipated. Whip Media, which tracks viewership data for the more than 21 million worldwide users of its TV Time app, calculated that National Treasure: Edge of History ranked as the tenth most streamed original television series in the U.S. during the week of December 18 and rose to ninth during the week of December 25, 2022. It returned to tenth place during the weeks of January 1 and January 8, 2023. The series climbed to seventh by January 15 and moved up to fourth during the week of January 22. National Treasure: Edge of History dropped to fifth by January 29. It later settled back at seventh during the week of February 12. Nielsen Media Research, which records streaming viewership on U.S. television screens, estimated that series was watched for 294 million minutes from January 16-22, 2023.

=== Critical response ===
The review aggregator website Rotten Tomatoes reported an approval rating of 38% based on 21 critic reviews, with an average rating of 5.5/10. The website's critics consensus reads, "Treating the franchise's past with an overweening reverence while padding out its new cast with cloying sidekicks, this National Treasure spinoff tumbles over the edge of satisfaction." Metacritic, which uses a weighted average, assigned a score of 46 out of 100 based on 10 critics, indicating "mixed or average reviews".

Kayleigh Donaldson of TheWrap said the series is a nostalgic throwback to action-adventure TV with a familiar but entertaining tone. She thought the show effectively captured the lighthearted spirit of the original films, despite the absence of Nicolas Cage. Donaldson praised Lisette Olivera’s performance as Jess and highlighted Catherine Zeta-Jones’ stylish portrayal of a villain, saying it brought energy to an otherwise well-worn plot. While she stated that the series doesn’t break new ground, Donaldson appreciated its engaging puzzles and the subtle exploration of historical themes like colonialism. David Cote of The A.V. Club gave Edge of History a B− rating. He remarked that while the series might feel nostalgic and familiar, the character of Jess Valenzuela is a welcome addition. Cote noted that the show’s approach is more kid-friendly compared to the original films and appreciated the subtle shift in focus from the Freemasons to themes of colonialism and resistance. However, he found the series to be somewhat slow-paced and criticized its sometimes grating youth-oriented dialogue. Despite these issues, Cote praised the engaging puzzles and the solid performances, particularly from Olivera and Catherine Zeta-Jones.

Lucy Mangan of The Guardian rated the series three out of five stars, describing it as a nostalgic nod to 80s and 90s entertainment. She highlighted the show for its fun, action-packed adventure reminiscent of Indiana Jones and The Mummy. Mangan appreciated the new protagonist, Jess Valenzuela, and the engaging mix of puzzles and relic-hunting, even without Nicolas Cage. While Mangan acknowledged the series' predictable plot and some lackluster dialogue, she found it enjoyable and a good example of Bruckheimer’s entertaining escapism. Polly Conway of Common Sense Media rated Edge of History three out of five stars. She praised Jess Valenzuela as a quick-minded and compassionate role model and noted the positive themes of teamwork and ethical decision-making, even when bending the rules. Conway pointed out that the series offers opportunities for family discussions on topics such as the challenges faced by undocumented individuals and the importance of perseverance and teamwork. She described the show as a "fun, light treasure-hunting series with adventure and violence."

=== Accolades ===
National Treasure: Edge of History was one of 200 television series that received the ReFrame Stamp for the years 2022 to 2023. The stamp is awarded by the gender equity coalition ReFrame and industry database IMDbPro for film and television projects that are proven to have gender-balanced hiring, with stamps being awarded to projects that hire women, especially women of color, in four out of eight key roles for their production.

Year	Award	Category	Nominee(s)	Result	Ref.
2023	Women's Image Network Awards	Drama Series	National Treasure: Edge of History	Nominated	
2023	Children's and Family Emmy Awards	Outstanding Main Title	National Treasure: Edge of History	Nominated	
2023	Children's and Family Emmy Awards	Outstanding Editing for a Single Camera Live Action Program	National Treasure: Edge of History	Nominated	
2023	Children's and Family Emmy Awards	Outstanding Supporting Performance in a Preschool, Children's or Young Teen Program	Catherine Zeta-Jones	Nominated	
2023	Imagen Awards	Best Primetime Program - Drama	National Treasure: Edge of History	Won	

== Future ==
In August 2024 Ted Elliott, the writer of National Treasure 3, revealed to the National Treasure Hunt podcast that he has been working on the project, completed his first draft of the script with "familiar faces" in the story, and that the TV series National Treasure: Edge of History is also being treated as canon.
