= Jon Turteltaub =

American film director, writer and producer (born 1963)

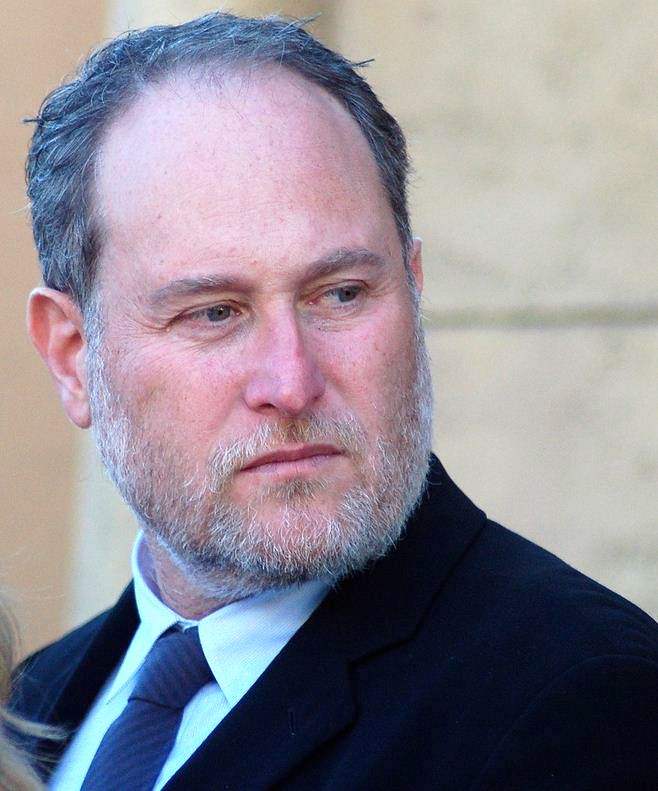
- Turteltaub in 2013
- Born: August 8, 1963 (age 63); New York City, New York, U.S.
- Education: Wesleyan University; USC School of Cinematic Arts
- Occupations: Film director, film writer, film producer
- Years active: 1989–present
- Spouse: Amy Eldon (m. 2006)
- Children: 3
- Relatives: Saul Turteltaub (father)

Jonathan Charles Turteltaub (born August 8, 1963) is an American filmmaker.

== Early life, family and education ==
Turteltaub was born on August 8, 1963, in New York City, one of two children born to comedy writer Saul Turteltaub (best known for his work on Sanford and Son) and his wife, Shirley Steinberg. His parents are both Jewish. Turteltaub graduated from Wesleyan University and the USC School of Cinematic Arts.

== Career ==
Jon Turteltaub has directed successful mainstream films for the Walt Disney Studios, including; 3 Ninjas (1992), Cool Runnings (1993), While You Were Sleeping (1995), Phenomenon (1996), Instinct (1999), Disney's The Kid (2000), National Treasure (2004), as well as its 2007 sequel National Treasure: Book of Secrets, and The Sorcerer's Apprentice (2010), as well as The Meg (2018) for Warner Brothers. Turteltaub produced the CBS television series Jericho. He also directed the show's first three episodes. In 1996, his production company Junction Entertainment had a film deal with Disney, and in 2006, signed a deal with Paramount Television, which would soon become CBS Paramount Network Television.

In 2020, Turteltaub directed two episodes of NBC's musical TV series Zoey's Extraordinary Playlist including the episode "Zoey's Extraordinary Glitch", which The Hollywood Reporter listed as one of the 10 best episodes of television that year.

== Personal life ==
Turteltaub is married to British television writer and producer Amy Eldon, co-founder of Creative Visions Foundation. Their family resides in Malibu, California, next door to his in-laws. Amy's brother photojournalist Dan Eldon was stoned to death alongside several other journalists in Somalia in 1993.

Turteltaub serves on the Creative Council of Represent.Us, a nonpartisan anti-corruption organization.

Ahead of the 2020 U.S. presidential election, Turteltaub directed an anti-Trump video for the Lincoln Project.

== Filmography ==
Film

Year	Title	Director	Producer	Writer
1988	Whatever It Takes	Yes	Yes	Yes
1990	Think Big	Yes	No	Yes
1991	Driving Me Crazy	Yes	No	Yes
1992	3 Ninjas	Yes	No	No
1993	Cool Runnings	Yes	No	No
1995	While You Were Sleeping	Yes	No	No
1996	Phenomenon	Yes	No	No
1999	Instinct	Yes	No	No
2000	Disney's The Kid	Yes	Yes	No
2004	National Treasure	Yes	Yes	No
2007	National Treasure: Book of Secrets	Yes	Yes	No
2010	The Sorcerer's Apprentice	Yes	No	No
2013	Last Vegas	Yes	No	No
2018	The Meg	Yes	No	No

Television

Year	Title	Director	Executive Producer	Notes
1998	From the Earth to the Moon	Yes	No	Episode: "That's All There Is"
2006	Jericho	Yes	Yes	3 episodes
2009	Harper's Island	Yes	Yes	Episode: "Whap"
2012	Common Law	Yes	Yes	Episode: "Pilot"
2016	Rush Hour	Yes	No	Episode: "Pilot"
2020	Zoey's Extraordinary Playlist	Yes	No	2 episodes
2022	National Treasure: Edge of History	No	Yes	
