= Charles Segars =

American film producer

- Born: Charles Segars; April 15, 1963 (age 63); Pittsburgh, Pennsylvania, United States
- Occupations: Media and Communications Executive, Producer/Writer

Charles Segars is a Media and Communications executive, National Security consultant, a Producer/Writer and a native of Pittsburgh. He is CEO of Ovation (U.S. TV channel), EVP of Co-Media and partner of OPSEC Alliance . He has had an extensive career across multi-platform disciplines.

== Early life ==
Charles Segars has a Bachelor of Arts degree from Loyola Marymount University in Los Angeles, and completed a graduate certificate in International Security and Policy at Stanford University in 2011.

== Business career ==
Segars was a senior executive at Viacom, CBS, The Walt Disney Company, and DreamWorks Pictures, and DreamWorks Animation. He also led a number of online community subscription service businesses, from founding to successful exits. He was a senior executive at MarketRange/PerfectMatch.com, and co-founded a movie fan site, CountingDown.com. Segars is also known for creating and executive producing the Walt Disney Studios Motion Pictures hit movie franchise, National Treasure and National Treasure: Book of Secrets. Currently, Segars enjoys a dual role as CEO of Ovation TV – the only multi-platform program service dedicated to the Arts and as President of Segars Media – an advisory firm specializing in helping companies and their management teams navigate disruption across all aspects of their global enterprises. With an early career in law enforcement, Segars is a known global safety and security analyst.

== Political and civic activities ==
Charles Segars is a 25-year law enforcement veteran in Los Angeles County. From 2008-2016 and 2020-2024, Segars was a White House Associate as an Advance Team leader for the Office of the President and Vice President of the United States of America, leading a number of domestic and international trips. Segars is also a tireless advocate for after school programs in the arts and sciences and has testified on a number of Congressional committees highlighting effective programs that reduce crime, drug use and raise graduate rates. He currently serves on the Board of Trustees for Ford's Theatre in Washington DC. He is an active member of the Writers Guild of America, Producers Guild of America and INSA, and has recently joined Carnegie Mellon as an adjunct professor for its Master of Entertainment Industry Management program.

== Filmography ==
- National Treasure (2004) – Executive Producer, Writer (story)
- National Treasure: Book of Secrets (2007) – Executive Producer, Writer (Characters)
- Gravity (TV Movie) (2007) – Executive Producer
- The Law (TV Movie) (2009) – Executive Producer
- National Treasure 3 (announced) – Executive Producer
- Inside the Actors Studio (2019–present) – Executive Producer
