= Jack Sparrow =

Protagonist of the Pirates of the Caribbean film series

Captain Jack Sparrow
- Pirates of the Caribbean character
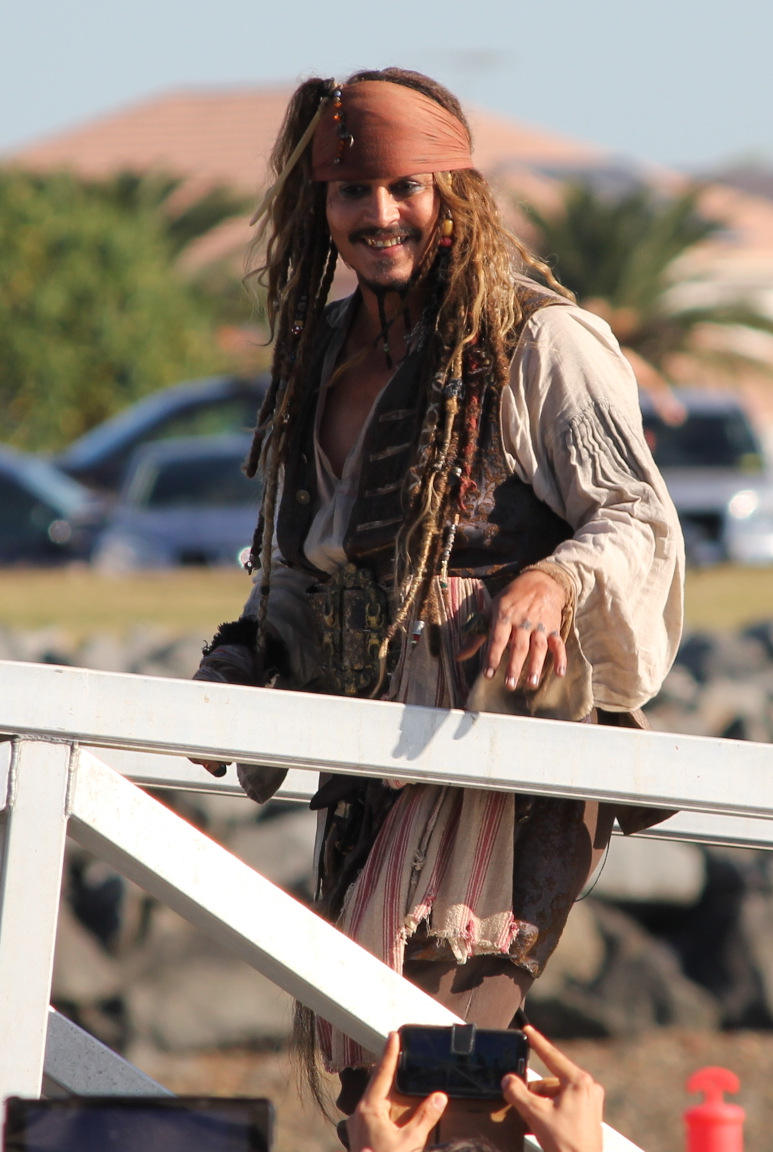
- Johnny Depp as Captain Jack Sparrow on the set of Pirates of the Caribbean: Dead Men Tell No Tales
- First appearance: The Curse of the Black Pearl (Junior Novelization) (2003)
- Created by: Jay Wolpert; Stuart Beattie; Ted Elliott; Terry Rossio; Johnny Depp
- Based on: Keith Richards; Long John Silver
- Portrayed by: Johnny Depp; Anthony De La Torre (Note: Anthony De La Torre, with his face replaced with a CGI replica of a younger Depp's and his voice replaced by Jared Butler, played a younger Jack in Dead Men Tell No Tales (2017).) (young)
- Voiced by: Johnny Depp (2006); Jared Butler (2007–present); James Arnold Taylor (2006)

In-universe information
- Aliases: Smith/Smithy; Justice Smith; Mr. Smith
- Nicknames: Jackie/Jacky; Jackie boy/Jacky boy Jack the Sparrow
- Species: Human
- Gender: Male
- Title(s): Captain; Pirate Lord of the Caribbean sea
- Occupation: Pirate; Formerly: Captain for the East India Trading Company
- Affiliation: Crew of the Black Pearl; Formerly: East India Trading Company; Blackbeard's Crew
- Weapon: Cutlass; Flintlock
- Family: Edward Teague (father); Jack (uncle)
- Nationality: English
- Appearance(s): Film series; Young Jack Sparrow books; The Price of Freedom; Legend of the Brethren Court books; Video games; Ride; Disney Infinity; Kingdom Hearts II; Kingdom Hearts III; Sea of Thieves; Fortnite; Disney Speedstorm

Captain Jack Sparrow is a fictional character and the protagonist of Disney's Pirates of the Caribbean franchise. He first appeared in the Pirates of the Caribbean: The Curse of the Black Pearl (2003) and later appeared in Dead Man's Chest (2006), At World's End (2007), On Stranger Tides (2011), and Dead Men Tell No Tales (2017). During the initial development of the film series, Jack Sparrow was conceived as a supporting role, but as the storyline of the series progressed, actor Johnny Depp gained recognition as the breakout performer in the role of Captain Jack Sparrow, largely becoming the franchise's central figure.

The character is based on a combination of the Rolling Stones' guitarist Keith Richards, Groucho Marx, and Looney Tunes cartoons, specifically the characters Bugs Bunny and Pepé Le Pew. An early iteration of the character was created by screenwriter Jay Wolpert, with later drafts by Stuart Beattie and writing partners Ted Elliott and Terry Rossio, but the final version of Sparrow was created by actor Johnny Depp, who also portrayed him.

In the films, Sparrow is the pirate captain of the Black Pearl, and is later revealed to be one of the nine pirate lords in the Brethren Court, serving as the Pirate Lord of the Caribbean. The character is primarily defined as a trickster who can be treacherous and survives mostly by using wit, guile, and negotiation rather than force, opting to flee most dangerous situations and fight only when necessary.

Sparrow is introduced seeking to regain the Black Pearl from his mutinous first mate Hector Barbossa. After succeeding, he attempts to escape his blood debt to the legendary Davy Jones by finding the Dead Man's Chest, as well as becoming embroiled in a war between the Brethren Court and the East India Trading Company. Later, when searching for the Fountain of Youth, he is abducted and taken aboard Blackbeard's Queen Anne's Revenge. Sparrow is subsequently forced to lead Blackbeard to the Fountain while the shrunken Black Pearl is trapped in a bottle. In a later adventure, when the ghost Spanish Captain Armando Salazar pursues him, he searches for the Trident of Poseidon while also seeking to restore the Pearl to its original form.

Captain Jack Sparrow headlined much of the franchise, including the Disney theme parks and entertainment. In 2006, he was added to a revised story of the Pirates of the Caribbean ride to better tie the location into an emerging, overarching Pirates mythology. The character also headlined The Legend of Captain Jack Sparrow at Disney's Hollywood Studios. Jack Sparrow is also the subject of spin-off novels, including the Jack Sparrow children's book series, which chronicles his childhood years, and The Price of Freedom, the adult novel by Ann C. Crispin. Depp's performance in Curse of the Black Pearl earned him an Oscar nomination, and the character has gone on to become one of the most iconic in film history.

== Concept and creation ==
=== Character ===
Stuart Beattie, who drafted early versions of the film's script, said he created the character Jack Sparrow with Hugh Jackman in mind to play the part. However, since Jackman was not well known outside of his native Australia, the more-famous Johnny Depp was cast instead. Depp found the script quirky; rather than seeking treasure, the crew of the Black Pearl were trying to return it; also, the traditional mutiny had already taken place. Initially Sparrow was, according to Bruckheimer, "a young Burt Lancaster, just the cocky pirate." Jim Carrey was considered for the part, but the production schedule for Pirates of the Caribbean conflicted with Bruce Almighty. Other actors considered for the role include Michael Keaton and Christopher Walken. Eventually, Depp was cast, as Bruckheimer felt he could give the character the edge.

When writing the screenplay for The Curse of the Black Pearl, Ted Elliott and Terry Rossio envisioned Captain Jack Sparrow as a supporting character in the vein of Bugs Bunny and Groucho Marx. Director Gore Verbinski admitted, "The first film was a movie, and then Jack was put into it almost. He doesn't have the obligations of the plot in the same ways that the other characters have. He meanders his way through, and he kind of affects everybody else." Sparrow represents an ethical pirate, with Captain Barbossa as his corrupt foil, though both characters viewed as both light and dark tricksters. His true motives usually remain masked, and whether he is honorable or evil depends on the audience's perspective. This acts as part of Will Turner's arc, in which Sparrow tells him a pirate can be a good man, like his father. During the initial development of the film series, the character Elizabeth Swann (Keira Knightley) was conceived as the protagonist of the trilogy. As the storylines progressed, however, Johnny Depp gained recognition as the series's breakout performer in the role of Captain Jack Sparrow, largely becoming the franchise's central figure.

Following the success of The Curse of the Black Pearl, the challenge to creating a sequel was, according to Verbinski, "You don't want just the Jack Sparrow movie. It's like having a garlic milkshake. He's the spice and you need a lot of straight men ... Let's not give them too much Jack. It's like too much dessert or too much of a good thing." Although Dead Man's Chest was written to propel the trilogy's plot, Sparrow's state-of-mind as he is pursued by Davy Jones becomes increasingly edgy, and the writers concocted the cannibal sequence to show that he was in danger whether on land or at sea. Sparrow is perplexed over his attraction to Elizabeth Swann, and attempts to justify it throughout the film.

At World's End was meant to return it tonally to a character piece. Sparrow, in particular, is tinged with madness after extended solitary confinement in Davy Jones's Locker, and now desires immortality. Sparrow struggles with what it takes to be a moral person, after his honest streak caused his doom in the second film. This is mainly shown by his increasingly erratic behaviour and Jack's hallucinations, which appeared to be simply his deranged mind in the beginning where dozens of "Jack Sparrows" appeared to crew the ship in his solitary exile, but later the hallucinations grew more important and there were mainly two "Jacks" constantly arguing about which path to follow: the immortality or the mortality. The last hallucination took place while Jack was imprisoned on the Dutchman, where his honest streak won. By the end of At World's End, Sparrow is sailing to the Fountain of Youth, an early concept for the second film.

By September 2006, Mark Zoradi, president of the Disney Motion Pictures Group was quoted as saying, "The third film... will conclude the initial Pirates trilogy, though it is unlikely to be the last Pirates sequel." Terry Rossio said in 2007 that a fourth film was possible, and producer Jerry Bruckheimer expressed interest in a spin-off. Gore Verbinski concurred that "all of the stories set in motion by the first film have been resolved. If there ever were another Pirates of the Caribbean film, I would start fresh and focus on the further adventures of Captain Jack Sparrow." The fourth film was first announced on September 28, 2008, during a Disney event at the Kodak Theatre with Johnny Depp and Walt Disney Studios chairman Dick Cook, with Depp in full Captain Jack Sparrow attire, while also wearing the Lone Ranger mask to announce his involvement in a Lone Ranger movie. Depp and Cook appeared in the 2009 D23 Expo and announced Pirates of the Caribbean: On Stranger Tides, a subtitle taken from Tim Powers' novel of the same name, which included the Fountain of Youth and Blackbeard, though the film is not a straight adaptation of the novel. Verbinski did not return to direct the fourth installment and was replaced by Rob Marshall.

The fifth film, Dead Men Tell No Tales, was co-directed by Joachim Rønning and Espen Sandberg.

=== Johnny Depp ===
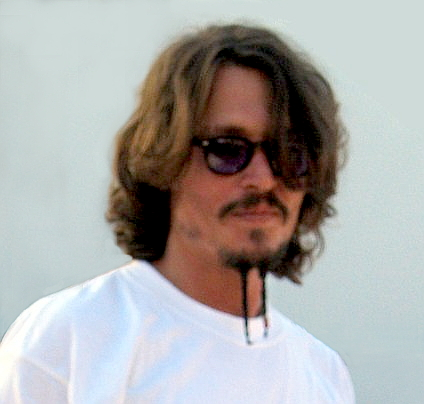
Johnny Depp during filming, sporting Jack's 'goatee' applied in makeup

Looking to do a family film, Johnny Depp visited the Walt Disney Studios in 2001 when he heard of plans to adapt the Pirates of the Caribbean ride into a film. Depp was excited by the possibility of reviving an old Hollywood genre, and found the script met his quirky sensibilities: the crew of the Black Pearl were not in search of treasure but trying to return it to lift a curse on them, and the traditional mutiny had already occurred. Depp was cast on June 10, 2002. Producer Jerry Bruckheimer felt Depp would give the film an edge that could draw teenage and adult audiences despite Disney's reputation for soft children's fare.

According to various reports and interviews, Johnny Depp prepared for the role while rehearsing in the steam room of a sauna. At times, he claimed to turn the heat up to its max temperature of 1,000 degrees. The actor was quoted as saying, "Captain Jack was actually born in a sauna—my sauna. I figured this is a guy who has been on the high seas for probably all of his life, the majority of his life at least, and therefore probably dealt with a lot of inescapable heat to the brain." Depp also said, due to his daughter Lily-Rose Depp being three years old at the time, he watched various cartoons, using Tex Avery and Wile E. Coyote as examples.

At the first read-through, Depp surprised the cast and crew by portraying the character in an off-kilter manner. He researched 18th-century pirates and, seeing parallels with modern rock stars, modeled his performance on Keith Richards. Richards later appeared in two cameos as Jack's father, Captain Teague, in At World's End and On Stranger Tides. Verbinski and Bruckheimer had confidence in Depp, partly because Orlando Bloom would play the traditional Errol Flynn-type character. Depp improvised the film's final line, "Now, bring me that horizon", which the writer called his favorite line. Disney executives were initially confused by Depp's performance, questioning whether the character was drunk or gay. While watching the rushes, Disney CEO Michael Eisner proclaimed Depp was ruining the film. Depp's response to Disney executives was they could trust him with his choices or let him go. Many industry insiders questioned Depp's casting, as he was an unconventional actor not known for working within the traditional studio system.

Depp's performance won acclaim from film critics. Alan Morrison found it "Gloriously over-the-top ... In terms of physical precision and verbal delivery, it's a master-class in comedy acting." Roger Ebert praised Depp for drawing away from the character as written and found Depp's performance "original in its every atom. There has never been a pirate, or for that matter a human being, like this in any other movie ... his behavior shows a lifetime of rehearsal". Depp won a Screen Actor's Guild award for his performance, and was nominated for a Golden Globe and the Academy Award for Best Actor, the first in his career. Film School Rejects argued the film made Depp as much a movie star as he was a character actor.

Depp's return in Dead Man's Chest was the first time he had ever made a sequel. Drew McWeeny wrote, "Remember how cool Han Solo was in Star Wars the first time you saw it? And then remember how much cooler he seemed when Empire came out? This is that big a jump." Depp received an MTV Movie Award and a Teen Choice Award for Dead Man's Chest, and was nominated for an Empire Award and another Golden Globe. For his performance in At World's End, Depp won an MTV Movie Award for Best Comedic Performance, as well as a People's Choice Award, a Kids' Choice Award, and another Teen Choice Award. He has signed on to reprise the role for future sequels.

=== Make-up and costumes ===
Early character sketches of Johnny Depp as Jack Sparrow by Crash McCreery. An initial costume concept before Depp's ideas took hold.

Depp wears a dreadlock wig in a rock-and-roll approach to a pirate aesthetic. He wears a red bandanna and numerous objects in his hair, influenced by Keith Richards' habit of collecting souvenirs from his travels; Sparrow's decorations include his "piece of eight". Sparrow wears kohl around his eyes, which was inspired by Depp's study of nomads, whom he compared to pirates, and he wore contacts that acted as sunglasses. Sparrow has several gold teeth, two of which belong to Depp, although they were applied during filming. Depp initially forgot to have them removed after shooting The Curse of the Black Pearl, and wore them throughout the shooting of the sequels. Like all aspects of Depp's performance, Disney initially expressed great concern over Depp's teeth. Depp also fought for Sparrow to be "missing his nose, with just a bloody wound in its place" for "comedic value"; this subtraction to the character was going to give Sparrow a new fear of the common cold, as well as becoming afraid of other extremely common things. Sparrow also would have avoided pepper, and the water—which would have posed a massive problem for the sea-faring character. Sparrow wears his goatee in two braids. Initially wire was used in them, but the wires were abandoned because they made the braids stick up when Depp lay down. Sparrow has numerous tattoos, and has been branded a pirate on his right arm by Cutler Beckett, underneath a tattoo of a sparrow.

Depp collaborated with costume designer Penny Rose on his character's appearance, handpicking a tricorne as Sparrow's signature leather hat; to make Sparrow's unique, the other characters did not wear leather hats. A rubber version was used for the scene in Dead Man's Chest when the hat floats on water. Depp liked to stick to one costume, wearing one lightweight silk tweed frock coat throughout the series, and he had to be coaxed out of wearing his boots for a version without a sole or heel in beach scenes. The official line is that none of the costumes from The Curse of the Black Pearl survived, which allowed the opportunity to create tougher linen shirts for stunts. However, one remains which has been displayed in an exhibition of screen costumes in Worcester, England. It was a nightmare for Rose to track down the same makers of Sparrow's sash in Turkey. Rose did not want to silkscreen it, as the homewoven piece had the correct worn feel. Sparrow wears an additional belt in the sequels, because Depp liked a new buckle which did not fit with the original piece.

Sparrow's weapons are genuine 18th-century pieces: his sword dates to the 1740s and his pistol is from the 1760s. Both were made in London. Depp used two pistols on set, one of rubber. Both survived production of the first film. Sparrow's magic compass also survived into the sequels, though director Gore Verbinski had a red arrow added to the dial as it became a more prominent prop. As it does not act like a normal compass, a magnet was used to make it spin. Sparrow wears four rings, two of which belong to Depp. Depp bought the green ring in 1989 and the gold ring is a replica of a 2400-year-old ring Depp gave to the crew, though the original was later stolen. The other two are props to which Depp gave backstories: the gold-and-black ring is stolen from a Spanish widow Sparrow seduced and the green dragon ring recalls his adventures in the Far East. Among Depp's additional ideas was the necklace made of human toes that Sparrow wears as the Pelegosto prepare to eat him, and the sceptre was based on one a friend of Depp's owned.

During the course of the films, Sparrow undergoes physical transformations. In The Curse of the Black Pearl, Sparrow curses himself to battle the undead Barbossa. Like all the actors playing the Black Pearl crew, Depp had to shoot scenes in costume as a reference for the animators, and his shots as a skeleton were shot again without him. Depp reprised the scene again on a motion capture stage. In At World's End, Sparrow hallucinates a version of himself as a member of Davy Jones's crew, adhered to a wall and encrusted with barnacles. Verbinski oversaw that the design retained Sparrow's distinctive look, and rejected initial designs which portrayed him as over 100 years old. In Dead Men Tell No Tales, a young Jack Sparrow appears during a flashback sequence.

== Fictional character biography ==
=== Before the films ===
According to the 2006 reference book Pirates of the Caribbean: The Visual Guide and the 2007 reprint The Complete Visual Guide, Jack Sparrow was born on a pirate ship during a typhoon and was trained to fence by an Italian. The 2011 book On Stranger Tides: The Visual Guide says that Jack described himself as a notorious and infamous pirate, brigand, pillager, and highwayman, sailing a fine line between piratical genius and mercurial madness, and having an enemy in every port. Jack wore a ragbag of garb from the four corners of the earth; whether it's a silk headscarf from Singapore or a pistol belt from Port Royal, he hadn't paid for any of it. Jack also had the way to the Fountain of Youth committed to his memory, likely due to the use of his compass and Sao Feng's navigational charts.

Books following Jack Sparrow's adventures before the events of the film include a twelve-book series focusing on his teenage years entitled Pirates of the Caribbean: Jack Sparrow, and a five-books Pirates of the Caribbean: Legends of the Brethren Court series.

The 2017 film, Pirates of the Caribbean: Dead Men Tell No Tales, features a flashback with how "Jack the Sparrow" meets the Spanish Navy Captain Armando Salazar. Sparrow was the helmsman aboard the Wicked Wench, a pirate ship which may or may not be the Black Pearl, under the command of Captain Morgan, who was killed in battle. In the flashback, as reminisced upon by Salazar, the Silent Mary attacked pirate ships in battle until Captain Morgan died aboard the Wicked Wench, giving captaincy to young Sparrow. Sparrow outmaneuvers Salazar while being chased into the Devil's Triangle, in which the crew of the Wicked Wench throw ropes around nearby reefs off the port side and use the rigging to slingshot the ship in the opposite direction. Jack steers the ship through the reef, saving the crew and the ship by changing the ship's course at the last second. Afterward, on the deck of the Wicked Wench, the crew rewards Sparrow with "tribute" and bestows Jack with his famous hat and other personal effects.

Jack Sparrow's Jolly Roger is identical to a flag erroneously attributed to Henry Every, which was flown from the mast of the Black Pearl and a dinghy.

Ann C. Crispin wrote the Disney Publishing novel titled Pirates of the Caribbean: The Price of Freedom, published in 2011, which focuses more on the films' continuity rather than the other prequel books, and follows Jack's adventures as a merchant captain for the East India Trading Company, which was hinted in At World's End, due to Crispin reading the screenplay, though the scenes were deleted from the final cut of the film. Jack Sparrow captained the merchant ship Wicked Wench for Cutler Beckett for about a year, hauling various cargoes, but he refused to haul slaves. Hoping to recruit Sparrow as one of his many "operatives", Beckett indulged what he regarded as an odd peccadillo of Sparrow's until he and the captain came to part ways. Beckett had dispatched Sparrow on a mission to find the lost island of Kerma, and the treasure at the heart of its underground labyrinth, but Sparrow double-crossed the EITC official and claimed he couldn't locate the island. Suspicious that Sparrow had indeed found the island and the treasure, but had not given him its accurate location, Beckett determined to browbeat the captain into obedience and demanded that the young captain transport a cargo of slaves to the New World. Initially, Sparrow agreed, but when he realized that he was betraying the Wicked Wench, as well as himself, he rebelled and freed the slaves by taking them to Kerma for safe asylum. Furious that Sparrow had flouted his orders and stolen the "cargo" of "black gold", Beckett had Sparrow thrown into jail. After allowing him to languish for a couple of months, Beckett had Sparrow transported to the Wicked Wench's anchorage, about a mile from the coast of West Africa, near Calabar on the Bight of Benin. After personally branding Sparrow with the "P" brand (so he'd be forever identifiable as a pirate), Cutler Beckett gave the order to fire incendiary carcass charges at the Wicked Wench, to demoralize her captain. Sparrow fought his way free from his guards, dove overboard, and attempted to rescue his burning, foundering ship, but he was too late. The Wicked Wench turned into an inferno, then sank, taking Jack with her. But, while dying, Sparrow called upon Davy Jones, and struck a bargain with him: his soul and one hundred years of service aboard the Flying Dutchman, in return for continued human existence of thirteen years as captain, plus saving the Wicked Wench and transforming her into the fastest, most dangerous pirate ship on the seven seas. Jones agreed and raised the ship from the sea floor, now a charred vessel with an angel figurehead. In keeping with her scorched appearance, Jack painted his ship black and added black sails, rechristening her "the Black Pearl".

At some point, Hector Barbossa joins Jack Sparrow as his first mate. The original backstory was that Jack recruited Barbossa and his cronies prior to the voyage to Isla de Muerta. However, in the Legends of the Brethren Court book series, Hector Barbossa was Sparrow's first mate in the quest for the Shadow Gold, where Tia Dalma tasks them with securing seven vials of shadow gold to stop the Shadow Lord from gaining total control over the seas by destroying the Brethren Court with his Shadow Army. Over the course of the novels, they are able to collect all vials shattered across the world by allying with or fighting against the other Pirate Lords. They are able to defeat the Shadow Lord with the combined efforts of all Pirate Lords, after which Jack wants to sail for Tortuga to recruit a new crew. Barbossa offers him to handle that in his stead, implying that he recruited men with the intent to mutiny against his captain.

Two years after his deal with Davy Jones, Jack Sparrow sailed the Black Pearl and used his magical compass in search of the mysterious Isla de Muerta with a new crew, where the legendary Treasure of Cortés was hidden. Bootstrap Bill Turner was already a member of Jack's crew, while the other crewmen, like Pintel and Ragetti, were recruited in Tortuga. Jack was also the one who told his first mate Hector Barbossa and the rest of the crew about the curse that was upon the treasure, though nobody believed this ghost story. Captain and crew agreed to equal shares of the treasure, but devious first mate Barbossa persuaded Jack that equal shares included knowing the treasure's location. Jack complied, and soon after Barbossa led a mutiny and marooned Jack on an island with nothing but a pistol containing one shot. Although Jack was okay with Bootstrap Bill staying on board with Captain Barbossa, Jack hated Barbossa for having violated the Pirate's Code. Jack was able to escape after three days on the island and began his pursuit of the Black Pearl. Within the next ten years, Jack learned of how Barbossa's crew found the Aztec gold and became cursed, despite not believing in the curse placed on it, as well as how they are trying to get all the gold back and add their blood to the chest.

=== Films ===
==== The Curse of the Black Pearl ====
Captain Jack Sparrow first appears in The Curse of the Black Pearl (2003).

In his debut scene, Sparrow arrives in Port Royal, Jamaica on a sinking boat, seeking to commandeer a new ship. Despite rescuing Elizabeth Swann, the daughter of Governor Weatherby Swann, from drowning, he is jailed for piracy. That night, a cursed pirate ship called the Black Pearl attacks Port Royal and Elizabeth is kidnapped. The Black Pearl's captain, Hector Barbossa, desperately seeks one last gold coin to break an ancient Aztec curse that he and his crew are under. A blacksmith named Will Turner frees Sparrow to aid him in rescuing Elizabeth. They commandeer HMS Interceptor and recruit a motley crew in Tortuga, Haiti before heading to Isla de Muerta, where Elizabeth is held. Along the way, Will learns that Sparrow was the Black Pearl's original captain until Barbossa led a mutiny ten years earlier and took over the ship, marooning Sparrow on an island to die. Sparrow tells Turner that his father was a pirate known as "Bootstrap" Bill Turner.

The rescue goes awry after Will betrays Sparrow, thinking Sparrow was going to betray him, and Barbossa later maroons Jack and Elizabeth on the same island upon which he had stranded Sparrow before. Elizabeth creates a signal fire from rum barrels and they are rescued by the Royal Navy. Sparrow cuts a deal with Commodore James Norrington to lead Norrington to the Black Pearl. Norrington refuses until Elizabeth, desperate to save Will, spontaneously accepts Norrington's earlier marriage proposal. Right before the film's climactic battle with the pirates at Isla de Muerta, Sparrow swipes a cursed coin from the treasure chest, making himself immortal and capable of dueling Barbossa. He shoots his nemesis with the pistol he has carried for ten years just as Will breaks the curse, killing Barbossa. Despite having assisted the Navy, Sparrow is sentenced to hang.

At Sparrow's execution in Port Royal, Will saves Sparrow, but they are quickly captured. Elizabeth intervenes, declaring her love for Will who is pardoned, while Sparrow escapes by tumbling off a sea wall. The Black Pearl and her new crew arrive in time to retrieve him, and he becomes captain once more. Impressed by the wily pirate, Norrington allows him one day's head start before giving chase.

==== Dead Man's Chest ====
A year following the events of the first film, Sparrow searches for the Dead Man's Chest, which contains the heart of Davy Jones. Thirteen years prior to the events of the film, Sparrow made a bargain with Jones to raise the sunken Black Pearl and make Sparrow captain for thirteen years. Now the debt is due, and Bootstrap Bill Turner warns that Sparrow must either serve one hundred years aboard the Flying Dutchman, or be dragged to Davy Jones's Locker by the Kraken. Jack believes if he can find the Dead Man's Chest, he can free his soul as well as control Jones and the seas.

Adding to Sparrow's woes, Lord Cutler Beckett of the East India Trading Company has a personal score to settle and wants the chest himself. Beckett arrests Will Turner and Elizabeth Swann, forcing Turner to search for Sparrow and his magic compass. Turner locates Sparrow's crew on Pelegosto, held captive by cannibals who intend to eat Sparrow. They escape, and voyage to Tia Dalma (a magical woman later revealed to be the Goddess, Calypso, bound in human form as Dalma, and former lover of Jones). Dalma immediately sees destiny in Will, and provides Sparrow with a jar of dirt – Jones can only set foot on land once every 10 years, and since land is where Sparrow is safe, Dalma suggests with the dirt that he takes land with him.

Sparrow strikes a new deal with Jones to deliver one hundred souls in exchange for his own. Jones agrees but keeps Turner as a "good faith payment". Sparrow is recruiting sailors in Tortuga when he encounters Elizabeth Swann and James Norrington, the latter having succumbed to alcohol. Sparrow convinces Elizabeth that Turner can be freed by using the magic compass to find the chest. The duo head for Isla Cruces and find Will, who escaped Jones's ship and has stolen the key to the Chest. Turner wants to stab Jones's heart and free his father from Jones's servitude, while Norrington plots to restore his career by delivering the heart to Beckett. Sparrow wants it to convince Jones to call off the Kraken.

Norrington escapes with the heart amid a battle with Jones's crew, and Jones summons the Kraken. Realizing Sparrow is the target, Elizabeth traps him aboard the Black Pearl as the crew abandons the ship, and kisses him while she handcuffs him to the mast. Then, the monster devours Sparrow and drags the ship and his soul to Davy Jones's Locker. The surviving crew seeks refuge with Tia Dalma, who produces a captain she says can rescue Sparrow: a resurrected Hector Barbossa.

==== At World's End ====
Two months following the events of the second film, with Davy Jones's heart in his possession and the Flying Dutchman under his command, Cutler Beckett begins exterminating all pirates. To combat Beckett, the nine pirate lords of the Brethren Court convene at Shipwreck Cove. Only Jack Sparrow is missing, killed and sent to Davy Jones's Locker at the end of the previous film. Sparrow, as Pirate Lord of the Caribbean, must attend, as he did not bequeath to a designated heir his "piece of eight", a pirate lord's marker. The collective "nine pieces of eight" are needed to free sea goddess Calypso to defeat Beckett. With Elizabeth and Will, Barbossa leads Sparrow's crew to Davy Jones's Locker using stolen navigational charts from the pirate lord Sao Feng. After the crew locate him, Sparrow deciphers a clue on the charts allowing them to escape the Locker.

At the Brethren Court, Elizabeth has succeeded Captain Sao Feng as a Pirate Lord and is elected "Pirate King" after Sparrow breaks a stalemate vote. Sparrow is briefly reunited with his father, Captain Teague. During a parley with Beckett and Jones, Sparrow is traded for Turner, whom Jones and Beckett had captured. The Black Pearl battles the Flying Dutchman during a maelstrom created by Calypso, during which Sparrow fights Jones for the chest so that he may acquire Jones' heart to become immortal. When Jones mortally wounds Turner, Sparrow instead chooses to save Turner by helping him stab the heart, which kills Jones and makes Turner the Dutchman's captain. Together, the Pearl and the Dutchman destroy Beckett's ship. At the end, Barbossa again commandeers the Pearl and Sao Feng's charts, stranding Sparrow and Gibbs in Tortuga. However, Sparrow had managed to cut out the navigational section of the charts and with them begins to search for the legendary Fountain of Youth.

==== On Stranger Tides ====
Prior to the events of the film, Jack Sparrow gained some renown as the pirate who knew and memorized the Fountain of Youth's location. In the film, Joshamee Gibbs was put on trial in London until Sparrow himself arrived to rescue him as a disguised judge at the Old Bailey courthouse. However, they are captured at St James's Palace. Jack is dragged into a forced audience with King George II, who wants Sparrow to guide an expedition to the Fountain. Hector Barbossa, now a privateer in the service to the British with a peg leg, reveals to Jack that he lost his leg and the Black Pearl, which he believes to be sunk. Jack Sparrow escapes and crosses paths with a "Jack Sparrow" impostor, Angelica, a woman from Sparrow's past and ruthless con artist. Angelica shanghais Jack aboard the Queen Anne's Revenge, the ship captained by Blackbeard.

Angelica tells Jack she is conning about being Blackbeard's daughter, though later revealed she was telling the truth, and that Blackbeard wanting to find the Fountain to avoid a prophesied death. Although Jack incites a mutiny, saving the missionary named Philip Swift and fighting zombie officers, Blackbeard himself subdues the mutineers, using a sword that controls ships, a power that Jack's crew of mutineers are unaware of. Blackbeard also practices voodoo magic and fashions a voodoo doll to bend Jack Sparrow to his will. Jack learns from Angelica that the ritual for the Fountain requires a mermaid's tear and two silver chalices located on Ponce de León's ship, the Santiago, and the person who drinks the water with the tear gets all the years of life from the other. Angelica also shows Jack Blackbeard's collection of ships in bottles, including the Black Pearl. After capturing the mermaid Syrena at Whitecap Bay, Blackbeard sends Jack to get the chalices, taking his compass and threatening his own daughter at gunpoint. Aboard the Santiago, Jack meets Barbossa, but both find that the chalices have been taken by the Spanish. Before retrieving the chalices, Barbossa reveals his true agenda: revenge against Blackbeard for the attack on the Black Pearl, which Barbossa truly believes to be sunk, (Note: Screenwriter Terry Rossio released his unproduced screenplay for Pirates of the Caribbean: Dead Men Tell No Tales (2017), which includes additional information in extensive footnotes. Pertaining to On Stranger Tides, Rossio notes that Jack and Barbossa were each conning the other, while not knowing they were at the same time being conned. Barbossa does not know that the Black Pearl in a bottle, and Jack does not know the importance of Blackbeard's sword.) which led to cutting off his leg via self-dismemberment. Jack returns to give Blackbeard the chalices in exchange for Angelica's safety and Jack's compass, which Jack sends Gibbs off with.

After locating the Fountain of Youth, a battle ensues until Angelica cuts her hand trying to remove Barbossa's poisoned sword from Blackbeard's chest. Jack receives the chalices from Syrena, who tells him to not waste her tear. Filling the chalices with the remaining drops of water from the Fountain, Jack tricks Blackbeard into drinking the chalice lacking the mermaid's tear. Despite Blackbeard choosing to murder her so he can live, Angelica is mad at Jack about her father's death. Acknowledging their feelings for one another, Jack maroons Angelica with on a small island named Sola Fide Beach, unsure if he can trust her. Angered, Angelica then uses the one shot from her pistol to kill Jack as he rows away, but misses. Jack reunites with Gibbs, who used Sparrow's compass to locate and retrieved the shrunken Black Pearl. Though he has forfeited his opportunity for immortality, Sparrow tells Gibbs he's settling for being famous as the one who found the Fountain of Youth and determined to continue living the pirate's life. Following the film's end credits, the Jack Sparrow voodoo doll drifted to the island that Angelica is marooned on.

==== Dead Men Tell No Tales ====
Prior to the events of the film, Jack Sparrow's rival Hector Barbossa has become the richest and most powerful pirate of the seven seas, commanding a fleet of ten ships. Meanwhile, Jack has the Black Pearl still trapped in a bottle. Sparrow's new ship the Dying Gull has never left berth, and his latest plans have met with failure.

Sparrow and his crew attempt to rob the new bank of St. Martin. The robbery is a success, but all the gold in it had fallen while they were dragging the locker, and Sparrow's crew abandons him. Despondent, Jack trades his magical compass for a drink. However, this betrayal of the compass releases an old enemy, who holds a serious grudge against Sparrow; the ruthless ghostly pirate hunter Captain Armando Salazar. Years previously, Jack had defeated Salazar by tricking him into sailing his ship into the Devil's Triangle, where Salazar and his crew were cursed to live as the undead. Salazar states that Jack perched in the ship's rigging like a "little bird", earning him the name "Jack the Sparrow".

While in prison, Jack is contacted by Henry Turner, the son of Will Turner and Elizabeth Swann, who asks for aid in finding the Trident of Poseidon, as both are in need of its power to break curses related to the sea. The Trident could help save Sparrow from Salazar's revenge and free Will from the Flying Dutchman. Remembering Will and Elizabeth, expressing some hesitation, Jack agrees. The next day, Sparrow is sentenced to be executed by guillotine (by Jack's accidental choosing), but is rescued by his crew. Aided by aspiring astronomer Carina, Jack and Henry attempt to locate the Trident of Poseidon. Barbossa releases the Pearl from its bottle, giving them a chance to outrun Salazar. Jack and Barbossa discuss the fact that Carina is Hector's long-lost daughter, whom he had left at an orphanage in order to give her a chance for a better life. Jack attempts to use the secret to blackmail Barbossa, but fails.

They are able to track the Trident to its resting place. Though Salazar nearly kills Jack, they are able to destroy the Trident. With the destruction of the Trident, Salazar and his crew become mortal again. Jack, Henry and Carina escape as Barbossa sacrifices himself to kill Salazar. Despite their differences, Jack mourns Barbossa's death. Later, Jack watches Will and Elizabeth's reunion before he departs, sailing with the Black Pearl and his compass once again in his possession.

== Characterization ==
According to screenwriters Ted Elliott and Terry Rossio, Sparrow is a trickster, who uses wit and deceit to attain his goals, preferring to end disputes verbally instead of by force. He walks with a slightly drunken swagger and has slurred speech and flailing hand gestures. Sparrow is shrewd, calculating, and eccentric. He fools Norrington and his crew to set sail on the royal ship Interceptor, which compels the admiration of Lieutenant Groves as he concedes: "That's got to be the best pirate I have ever seen". Norrington himself acquiesces to this praise: "So it would seem", in sharp contrast to his earlier assertion: "You are without doubt the worst pirate I have ever heard of". In the third film, while Sparrow leaves Beckett's ship stranded and makes off, Lieutenant Groves asks: "Do you think he plans it all out, or just makes it up as he goes along?" Jack also tricks Blackbeard into saving his daughter by switching the two chalices required to use the fountain of youth.

Though a skilled swordsman, Sparrow prefers to use his superior intelligence during combat, exploiting his environment to turn the tables on his foes, reasoning "Why fight when you can negotiate?" and using non-violent negotiation to turn his enemies against each other. He invokes parleys and tempts his enemies away from their murderous intentions, encouraging them to see the bigger picture, as when he persuades Barbossa to delay returning to mortal form so he can battle the Royal Navy. He often uses complex wordplay and vocabulary to confound his enemies, and it is suggested that his pacifism may be one reason Barbossa and the crew of the Black Pearl mutinied.

"Gentlemen, m'lady, you will always remember this as the day that you almost caught Captain Jack Sparrow."
—Jack almost escapes another sticky situation

The character is portrayed as having created, or at least contributed to, his own reputation. When Gibbs tells Will that Sparrow escaped from a desert island by strapping two sea turtles together, Sparrow embellishes the story by claiming the rope was made of hair from his own back, while in reality, Sparrow escaped the island by bartering with rum traders. The video game Pirates of the Caribbean: The Legend of Jack Sparrow bases itself on these tall tales, including the sacking of Nassau port without firing a shot. Depp has likened pirates to rock stars in that their fame preceded them. Sparrow insists on being addressed as "Captain" and often gives the farewell, "This is the day you will always remember as the day that you almost caught Captain Jack Sparrow!" which is sometimes humorously cut short. When Norrington accuses him of being the worst pirate he has ever heard of, Sparrow replies, "But you have heard of me." In a deleted scene from The Curse of the Black Pearl Sparrow ponders being "the immortal Captain Jack Sparrow", and during At World's End he again is interested in immortality, although his father, Captain Teague, warns it can be a terrible curse. Sparrow ponders being "Captain Jack Sparrow, the last pirate," as the East India Trading Company purges piracy. The topic of immortality is brought up again during On Stranger Tides, when Jack says "But better to not know which moment may be your last, every morsel of your entire being alive to the infinite mystery of it all".

Despite his many heroics, Sparrow is a pirate and a morally ambiguous character. When agreeing to trade 100 souls, including Will, to Davy Jones in exchange for his freedom, Jones asks Sparrow whether he can "condemn an innocent man—a friend—to a lifetime of servitude in your name while you roam free?" After a hesitation Sparrow merrily replies, "Yep! I'm good with it!" He carelessly runs up debts with Anamaria, Davy Jones, and the other pirate lords. Sao Feng, pirate lord of Singapore, is particularly hateful towards him. In a cowardly moment, Sparrow abandons his crew during the Kraken's attack, but underlying loyalty and morality compel him to return and save them. Sparrow claims to be a man of his word, and expresses surprise that people doubt his truthfulness. There is no murder on his criminal record. He is shown to genuinely care about his allies and even people he doesn't know. He genuinely cared for Angelica, and even admits to her at the end of the film that he does love her, and even saves Phillip Swift, a missionary trapped on Blackbeard's ship whom he had never met before.

Depp partly based the character on Pepé Le Pew, a womanizing skunk from Looney Tunes. Sparrow claims to have a "tremendous intuitive sense of the female creature," although his conquests are often left with a sour memory of him. Former flames, Scarlett and Giselle, usually slap him or anyone looking for him. Likewise, Angelica claims that Jack "seduced her and used her". His witty charm easily attracts women, and even has Elizabeth questioning her feelings. Verbinski noted phallic connotations in Sparrow's relationship with his vessel, as he grips the ship's wheel. The Black Pearl is described as "the only ship which can outrun the Flying Dutchman". The Freudian overtones continue in the third film when Sparrow and Barbossa battle for captaincy of the Black Pearl, showing off the length of their telescopes, and in a deleted scene, they fight over the steering wheel. Sparrow claims his "first and only love is the sea," and describes his ship as representing freedom. Davy Jones's Locker is represented as a desert, symbolizing his personal hell.

In addition to the trickster element, Jack Sparrow was also based on Long John Silver as portrayed in the 1950 Disney Treasure Island adaptation, and Depp's experiences with Peter Ustinov's Blackbeard's Ghost and the Disneyland ride. One thing Elliott and Rossio took from their experience on Treasure Planet, was the simple premise of, "Is Long John Silver a delightful Falstaffian character or a contemptible villain?" That idea was something they carried into Jack Sparrow. In an article, The Guardian noted that "Nowadays all pirates (though not Somali pirates, interestingly) are in some sense a version of Long John Silver, even when they have got two legs – think of Captain Jack Sparrow." In the 2010s, various Turkish newspapers and websites popularised an unverified hypothesis put forth in the monthly Derin Tarih by writer Giles Milton that suggested that Jack Sparrow was inspired by the seventeenth-century English pirate John "Jack" Ward, an idea that was also covered by BBC History Magazine in 2020.

== Reception and impact on pop culture ==
When Dead Man's Chest grossed over $1 billion worldwide, Ian Nathan attributed this to Sparrow's popularity: "Pirates, the franchise, only had to turn up. There was a powerful holdover from the cheeky delights of its debut, something we hadn't felt since the Clone Wars called it a day." Empire in 2006 declared Depp's performance the seventy-fourth "thing that rocked our world" and later named him the eighth greatest movie character of all time. In 2015, a new poll of the 100 greatest film characters of all time placed him as the fourteenth greatest. A survey of more than 3,000 people showed Jack Sparrow was the most popular Halloween costume of 2006, and a 2007 poll held by the Internet Movie Database showed Sparrow to be the second most popular live action hero after Indiana Jones. In a 2007 Pearl & Dean poll, Jack Sparrow was listed as Depp's most popular performance.

Todd Gilchrist feels Sparrow is the only element of the films that will remain timeless. According to Sharon Eberson, the character's popularity can be attributed to his being a "scoundrel whose occasional bouts of conscience allow viewers to go with the flaws because, as played to the larger-than-life hilt by Depp, he owns every scene he is in". Film history professor Jonathan Kuntz attributed Sparrow's popularity to the increased questioning of masculinity in the 21st century, and Sparrow's personality contrasts with action-adventure heroes in cinema. Leonard Maltin concurs that Sparrow has a carefree attitude and does not take himself seriously. Mark Fox noted Sparrow is an escapist fantasy figure for women, free from much of the responsibility of most heroes. Sparrow is listed by IGN as one of their ten favorite film outlaws, as he "lives for himself and the freedom to do whatever it is that he damn well pleases. Precious few film characters have epitomized what makes the outlaw such a romantic figure for audiences as Captain Jack Sparrow has." Entertainment Weekly put it on its end-of-the-decade, "best-of" list, saying, "Part Keith Richards rift, part sozzled lounge lizard, Johnny Depp's swizzleshtick pirate was definitely one of the most dazzling characters of the decade." In June 2010, Sparrow was named one of Entertainment Weekly's 100 Greatest Characters of the Last 20 Years. In the May 2012 Greek elections, a voter gained media coverage when he "voted" for Jack Sparrow by writing his name on the Pirate Party of Greece ballot. In 2015, Amanda Teague gained media attention after becoming a Jack Sparrow impersonator.

An internet hoax about a reality program on the now-defunct Quibi platform called Jack Sparrow House gained traction in the early 2020s. The program supposedly featured fourteen Jack Sparrow impersonators living in a house together, with them being eliminated if they broke character. The hoax included a detailed Wikipedia article, which was eventually deleted. Snopes said that comedian Rory Strahan-Mauk was behind it, and that a photo claiming to be of the contestants were actually fans attending the Tokyo premiere of Dead Men Tell No Tales.

== In other media ==
Jack Sparrow in the Pirates of the Caribbean campaign of the 2013 Toys-to-life video game Disney Infinity

Jack Sparrow appears in video games and books spun off the Pirates of the Caribbean media franchise. Some notable Pirates video games in which Jack Sparrow appears as a playable character in include Pirates of the Caribbean: The Legend of Jack Sparrow, voiced by Johnny Depp, Pirates of the Caribbean: At World's End, voiced by Jared Butler, and Lego Pirates of the Caribbean: The Video Game, with archive audio of Johnny Depp's vocal effects. Jack was one of the first playable characters in the Disney Infinity series, where he is reprised by Jared Butler. He also appears in the Kingdom Hearts series, first in 2005's Kingdom Hearts II, where he is voiced by James Arnold Taylor, and again in 2019's Kingdom Hearts III, reprised again by Butler. In the A Pirate's Life expansion for the video game Sea of Thieves he is voiced again by Butler. Jack Sparrow also appears as playable character in Disney Magic Kingdoms, Disney Heroes: Battle Mode, and Disney Speedstorm. A purchasable cosmetic outfit of Jack Sparrow was added to Fortnite Battle Royale on July 19, 2024, as part of the Cursed Sails Event Pass.

In 2011, comedy group the Lonely Island, in collaboration with Michael Bolton, released a song named for Jack.

In July 2022, Depp portrayed a parody of Sparrow, Phillip Artoosh, in Adventurer's Game, a promotional short film for the mobile game Sea of Dawn.
