= Pirates of the Caribbean: The Curse of the Black Pearl =

2003 film by Gore Verbinski

- Theatrical release poster
- Directed by: Gore Verbinski
- Screenplay by: Ted Elliott; Terry Rossio
- Story by: Ted Elliott; Terry Rossio; Stuart Beattie; Jay Wolpert
- Based on: Walt Disney's Pirates of the Caribbean
- Produced by: Jerry Bruckheimer
- Starring: Johnny Depp; Geoffrey Rush; Orlando Bloom; Keira Knightley; Jonathan Pryce
- Cinematography: Dariusz Wolski
- Edited by: Craig Wood; Stephen Rivkin; Arthur Schmidt
- Music by: Klaus Badelt
- Production companies: Walt Disney Pictures; Jerry Bruckheimer Films
- Distributed by: Buena Vista Pictures Distribution
- Release dates: June 28, 2003 (Disneyland Resort); July 9, 2003 (United States)
- Running time: 143 minutes
- Country: United States
- Language: English
- Budget: $140 million
- Box office: $654.3 million

Pirates of the Caribbean: The Curse of the Black Pearl (Note: Originally titled and marketed as Pirates of the Caribbean) is a 2003 American swashbuckler film directed by Gore Verbinski. Produced by Jerry Bruckheimer and distributed by Buena Vista Pictures via the Walt Disney Pictures label, the film is based on the Pirates of the Caribbean attraction at Disney theme parks and is the first film in the Pirates of the Caribbean series. Starring Johnny Depp, Geoffrey Rush, Orlando Bloom, and Keira Knightley, it follows pirate Jack Sparrow (Depp) and blacksmith Will Turner (Bloom), as they attempt to rescue the kidnapped Elizabeth Swann (Knightley). The trio encounters Captain Hector Barbossa (Rush) and the Black Pearl crew who are afflicted by a supernatural curse.

Executives at Walt Disney Studios drafted a rough treatment for the film in 2000. A script was developed by Jay Wolpert in 2001, and was rewritten by Stuart Beattie in early 2002. Around that time, the producer Jerry Bruckheimer became involved in the project. He brought in screenwriters Ted Elliott and Terry Rossio, who had drafted a premise for the film in the 1990s. Elliott and Rossio added the curse to the script to align the film's story with the theme park ride. Verbinski eventually signed on as the director. Filming took place from October 2002 to March 2003 in Saint Vincent and the Grenadines and on sets in Los Angeles, California.

Pirates of the Caribbean had its world premiere at the Disneyland Resort in Anaheim, California, on June 28, 2003. It was theatrically released in the United States on July 9. Despite low expectations, the film was a massive box-office success: it grossed $654.3 million worldwide, making it the fourth-highest-grossing film of 2003. It received generally positive reviews from critics, and Depp won a Screen Actors Guild Award. He was also nominated for his performance at the Academy Awards, BAFTAs, and Golden Globes. Pirates of the Caribbean was also nominated for additional Academy Awards and BAFTAs. The film was followed by four sequels: Dead Man's Chest (2006), At World's End (2007), On Stranger Tides (2011), and Dead Men Tell No Tales (2017).

== Plot ==
In the early 18th century, Governor Weatherby Swann and his daughter Elizabeth sail aboard HMS Dauntless, captained by Lieutenant Norrington. They encounter a shipwreck and rescue a boy, Will Turner. Elizabeth notices a gold medallion around Will's neck and takes it while he is unconscious, before seeing a ghostly ship sailing away. Eight years later in Port Royal, Jamaica, Captain Norrington is being promoted to commodore while Will works as a blacksmith. A pirate captain named Jack Sparrow arrives in Port Royal seeking a ship.

Norrington proposes to Elizabeth atop a cliff, but she faints and falls into the ocean due to her tight-fitting corset, causing the medallion she is carrying to emit a pulse. Jack rescues Elizabeth and discovers the medallion. Governor Swann orders Jack's execution after he is identified as a pirate, but Jack flees into Will's smithy, where he is caught after Will duels him to a stalemate.

That night, Port Royal is attacked by the crew of the Black Pearl, who are searching for the medallion. After Elizabeth indentifies herself as Elizabeth Turner, the pirates take her hostage and bring her before Captain Barbossa. He reveals that the medallion is one of the 882 cursed gold pieces originally used to bribe Hernán Cortés to end his slaughter of the Aztecs. After stealing the gold from Isla de Muerta, Barbossa and his crew were cursed to become undead skeletons, unable to experience pleasure or pain. To lift the curse, the crew must return all the gold with an offering of blood from each member, but one piece belonging to "Bootstrap" Bill Turner, a crew member thrown overboard after the theft, is missing. Believing Elizabeth to be Bootstrap's daughter, Barbossa intends to use her blood for the ritual.

Intent on rescuing Elizabeth, Will frees Jack and they steal HMS Interceptor. They escape to Tortuga to recruit a crew from Joshamee Gibbs, who reveals Jack as the previous captain of the Black Pearl, whom Barbossa mutinied against and marooned on a deserted island. On Isla de Muerta, they sneak into the treasure grotto where Barbossa fails to lift the curse using Elizabeth's blood. Will and Elizabeth escape with the medallion, but Jack is captured and imprisoned on the Pearl, which pursues the Interceptor. Elizabeth informs Will of his true parentage. The Pearl destroys the Interceptor, with the crew captured by the pirates. Will surrenders to save Elizabeth, but threatens to kill himself unless she and the crew are left unharmed. Barbossa imprisons the crew and maroons Jack and Elizabeth on the same island that Jack was previously exiled to. Jack reveals that the island was used as a smuggling cache for rum runners, who rescued him after only three days. Elizabeth signals for help using a bonfire fueled by the rum, leading the Royal Navy to rescue them. She agrees to marry Norrington if he saves Will from Barbossa.

Jack and Norrington concoct a plan to ambush the pirates at Isla de Muerta, but Jack reveals himself to the pirates and convinces Barbossa to delay lifting the curse until after killing Norrington's men. After Barbossa's crew leaves, Jack frees Will and attacks Barbossa, having surreptitiously pocketed a medallion to give himself immortality. Elizabeth frees Jack's crew on the Pearl, but they sail away without her. Jack shoots Barbossa just as Will returns his and Jack's medallions to the chest with their blood, breaking the curse and killing Barbossa. The remaining pirates are defeated by the Navy.

At Port Royal, where Jack is to be hanged for his crimes, Will declares his love for Elizabeth before rescuing Jack. Jack and Will are surrounded by Norrington's soldiers, but Elizabeth joins Will, forcing Governor Swann to order the soldiers to stand down. Jack falls into the sea and is picked up by the Black Pearl. Norrington accepts that Elizabeth loves Will, and gives Jack a head start before pursuing him. Governor Swann gives his blessing to Will and Elizabeth, while Jack becomes captain of the Pearl.

In a post-credits scene, Jack, Barbossa's pet monkey, climbs onto the chest of gold in the cave on Isla de Muerta and takes a coin from it, becoming undead once more.

== Cast ==
- Johnny Depp as Captain Jack Sparrow: A notorious pirate characterized by his slightly drunken swagger, slurred speech and flailing hand gestures. He is determined to reacquire the Black Pearl.
- Orlando Bloom as Will Turner: A blacksmith's apprentice working in Port Royal who is in love with Elizabeth Swann. Will struggles with the fact that his father was a pirate.
- Keira Knightley as Elizabeth Swann: The daughter of Governor Weatherby Swann. She has been fascinated with pirates since childhood and is in love with Will.
  - Lucinda Dryzek as young Elizabeth Swann
- Geoffrey Rush as Captain Barbossa: The captain of the Black Pearl. He was Jack's first mate before he led a mutiny. Barbossa and his crew stole cursed Aztec gold and became immortal zombies.
- Jack Davenport as Norrington: An officer in the Royal Navy who seeks to marry Elizabeth.
- Kevin R. McNally as Joshamee Gibbs: Jack's loyal first mate who once served in the Royal Navy.
- Zoe Saldaña as Anamaria: A pirate who wants to confront Jack for stealing her ship. One of the film's screenwriters, Terry Rossio, stated that the name "AnaMaria" was chosen because it is the middle name of his daughter.
- Jonathan Pryce as Governor Weatherby Swann: The father of Elizabeth and the governor of Port Royal.
- Treva Etienne as Koehler: A lieutenant in Barbossa's cursed crew who is killed by Norrington.
- David Bailie as Cotton: A member of Jack's crew. His parrot talks for him because his tongue was cut out.
- Lee Arenberg as Pintel: A dimwitted member of the cursed crew.
- Mackenzie Crook as Ragetti: A member of the cursed crew who has a wooden eye.
- Isaac C. Singleton Jr. as Bo'sun, Barbossa's first mate
- Martin Klebba as Marty, a dwarf pirate who joins Sparrow's crew on the Interceptor
- Damian O'Hare as Lieutenant Gillette, Norrington's Second-in-Command
- Vince Lozano as Jacoby, a member of the cursed crew with a knack for explosives

Supporting characters include the cursed pirates Grapple (Trevor Goddard), Mallott (Brye Cooper), and Twigg (Michael Berry Jr.), and British Officer (Greg Ellis). The soldiers Murtogg and Mullroy are portrayed by Giles New and Angus Barnett, respectively.

== Production ==
=== Development ===
In 2001, Jay Wolpert wrote a script based on the Pirates of the Caribbean ride, which was based on a story created by the Walt Disney Studios executives Brigham Taylor, Michael Haynes and Josh Harmon. This story featured Will Turner as a prison guard who releases Jack Sparrow to rescue Elizabeth Swann, who is being held for ransom by Captain Blackheart. By March 2002, Disney brought Stuart Beattie in to rewrite the script because of his knowledge of piracy. Beattie stated that he talked about making a pirate film based on the ride while tossing a Frisbee with a friend and wrote a first draft titled "Quest for the Caribbean" while on exchange to Oregon State University in 1991.

Screenwriters Ted Elliott and Terry Rossio notably thought about a pirate film based on the ride during the early 1990s, having pitched the idea after completing work on the 1992 film Aladdin as a premise to studio executives who were not interested at the time. Undeterred, the writing team refused to give up the dream, waiting for a studio to pick up their take on a pirate tale. Having worked with Disney on Aladdin and the 2002 film Treasure Planet, among other successful films, Elliott and Rossio were also brought in for Pirates of the Caribbean to give it a "more supernatural spin". Ted Elliott and Terry Rossio were the final writers to receive screenplay credit, while all four writers received story credits.

When Dick Cook managed to convince producer Jerry Bruckheimer to join the project, he rejected Jay Wolpert's script because it was "a straight pirate movie". Later in March 2002, Bruckheimer brought Elliott and Rossio, who suggested making a supernatural curse—as described in the opening narration of the ride—the film's plot.

Disney was unsure whether to release the film in theaters or direct-to-video. The studio was interested in Matthew McConaughey as Sparrow because of his resemblance to Burt Lancaster, who had inspired that script's interpretation of the character. If they chose to release it direct-to-video, Christopher Walken or Cary Elwes would have been their first choice.

In May 2002, Gore Verbinski signed on to direct Pirates of the Caribbean. He was attracted to the idea of using modern technology to resurrect a genre that had disappeared after the Golden Age of Hollywood. He recalled his childhood memories of the ride, feeling the film was an opportunity to pay tribute to the "scary and funny" tone of it.

Although Cook had been a strong proponent of adapting Disney's rides into films, the box-office failure of The Country Bears (2002) made Michael Eisner attempt to shut down production of Pirates of the Caribbean. However, Verbinski told his concept artists to keep working on the picture, and when Eisner came to visit, Eisner was astonished by what had been created.

As recalled in the book DisneyWar, Eisner asked "Why does it have to cost so much?". Bruckheimer replied, "Your competition is spending $150 million," referring to franchises like The Lord of the Rings and The Matrix. Eisner concurred, but with the stigma attached to theme-park adaptations, Eisner requested Verbinski and Bruckheimer remove some of the more overt references to the ride in the Pirates of the Caribbean script, such as a scene where Sparrow and Turner enter a cave via a waterfall. Another change was the addition of The Curse of the Black Pearl as a subtitle in the event that the film proved successful enough to warrant sequels. Verbinski protested the change, as it is the Aztec gold that is cursed, not the Black Pearl ship. Eisner refused to back down and The Curse of the Black Pearl remained as the subtitle, although on most posters and trailers the words were so small as to be barely visible following a request from Verbinski.

==== Influence of the Monkey Island series of games ====
Ted Elliott was allegedly writing a George Lucas-produced animated film adaptation of The Curse of Monkey Island, which was cancelled before its official announcement, three years prior to the release of Pirates of the Caribbean. This film was allegedly in production at Industrial Light and Magic before being cancelled. Ron Gilbert, the creator of the Monkey Island series, has jokingly expressed a bitterness towards Pirates of the Caribbean films, specifically the second film, for its similarities to his game.

Gilbert has stated that Tim Powers' 1987 novel On Stranger Tides, which was adapted into the fourth Pirates film, was the principal source of inspiration for his video games. Pirates screenwriter Terry Rossio mentioned how Disney was hit with at least six plagiarism lawsuits for the first Pirates of the Caribbean film for supposedly stealing elements of the Monkey Island video game and the On Stranger Tides novel, despite there being a ride at Disneyland and also a first draft screenplay by other writers.

=== Casting ===
Stuart Beattie, who drafted early versions of the film's script, said he created the character Jack Sparrow with Hugh Jackman in mind to play the part. However, since Jackman was not well known outside of his native Australia at the time, the more-famous Johnny Depp was cast instead. Depp found the script quirky: rather than seeking treasure, the crew of the Black Pearl were trying to return it; also, the traditional mutiny had already taken place. Initially Sparrow was, according to Bruckheimer, "a young Burt Lancaster, just the cocky pirate." Jim Carrey was considered for the part, but the production schedule for Pirates of the Caribbean conflicted with Bruce Almighty. Other actors considered for the role include Michael Keaton and Christopher Walken. Eventually, Depp was cast, as Bruckheimer felt he could give the character the edge.

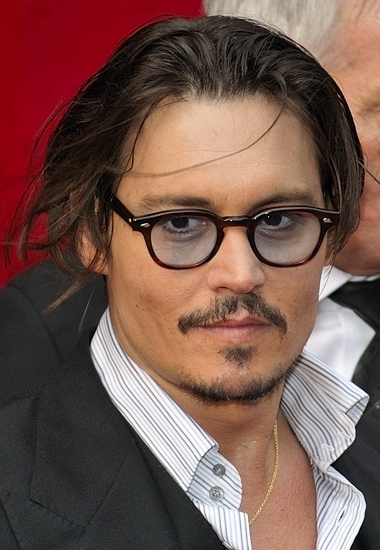
Johnny Depp in 2009

At the first read-through, Depp surprised the rest of the cast and crew by portraying the character in an off-kilter manner. After researching 18th-century pirates, Depp compared them to modern rock stars and decided to base his performance on Keith Richards. Although Verbinski and Bruckheimer had confidence in Depp, partly because it would be Bloom who was playing the traditional Errol Flynn type, Disney executives were confused, asking Depp whether the character was drunk or gay, and Michael Eisner at one point proclaimed, "He's ruining the film!" Depp also fought for Sparrow to be "missing his nose, with just a bloody wound in its place" for "comedic value"; this subtraction to the character was going to give Sparrow a new fear of the common cold, as well as becoming afraid of other extremely common things. Sparrow also would have avoided pepper, and the water—which would have posed a massive problem for the sea-faring character. Even Bruckheimer was slightly uncomfortable with Depp's decision to cap his teeth with gold. Depp later recalled, "I said, 'Look, these are the choices I made. You know my work. So either trust me or give me the boot.' And luckily, they didn't."

Verbinski approached Geoffrey Rush for the role of Hector Barbossa, as he knew he would not play it with attempts at complexity, but with a simple villainy that would suit the story's tone. Contrarily, Rush felt that he was playing the unsung hero of the film, who only dreamed about lifting the curse and living as a rich rogue with his prized pirate bride and developed an intricate backstory for the character to play him more convincingly. Originally, Rush was the second choice for the role behind Robert De Niro, who turned it down because he expected the film to flop in a similar manner to previous pirate films. Barbossa was conceptualized as a villain, a "dark trickster", and an evil counterpart to Sparrow. Depp created the name "Hector Barbossa" on set, but the name was never revealed onscreen.

Tobey Maguire, Jude Law, Ewan McGregor, Ben Peyton, Christopher Masterson, Christian Bale, Tom Hiddleston and Heath Ledger were considered for the role of Will Turner. Orlando Bloom read the script at the suggestion of Rush, and was eventually selected for the part. Tom Wilkinson was considered for the role of Governor Swann, while Brian Cox turned down the role because he did not want to work with Depp. The role of the governor ultimately went to Jonathan Pryce, whom Depp idolized.

In 2025 Sharon Osbourne revealed her husband Ozzy Osbourne was offered a chance to audition for a role in Pirates of the Caribbean, but it was "the biggest mistake" in declining.

=== Filming and design ===
Verbinski did not want an entirely romanticized feel to the film, but rather a sense of historical fantasy. Most of the actors wore prosthetics and contact lenses. Depp had contacts that acted as sunglasses, while Rush and Lee Arenberg wore dulled contacts that gave a sinister feel to the characters. Mackenzie Crook wore two contacts to represent his character's wooden eye: a soft version, and a harder version for when it protrudes. Their teeth and scurvy skin were dyed on. Depp carried a genuine pistol, which was made in London in 1760. A number of swords were built for the production by the blacksmith Tony Swatton.

The crew spent five months creating the cavern in which Barbossa and the Black Pearl crew attempt to reverse their curse, filling it with five feet of water, 882 gold coins, and applying gold paint to the styrofoam rocks for more impressions of treasure. The Port Royal fortress was built in Rancho Palos Verdes, California. Governor Swann's mansion was built at Manhattan Beach. A fire broke out in September 2002, causing $525,000 worth of damage, though no one was injured.

The filmmakers chose St. Vincent as their primary shooting location, as it contained the quietest beach they could find. They built three piers and a backlot for Port Royal and Tortuga. Of most importance to the film were the three ships: Black Pearl, Dauntless, and Interceptor. For budget reasons, the ships were built on docks, with only six days spent in the open sea for the battle between Black Pearl and Interceptor. Dauntless and Black Pearl were built on barges, with computer-generated imagery finishing the structures. Black Pearl was also built on the Spruce Goose stage, to control fog and lighting. Interceptor was a re-dressed Lady Washington, a full-scale replica sailing ship from Aberdeen, Washington, fully repainted before going on a 40-day voyage beginning December 2, 2002, arriving on location on January 12, 2003. A miniature was built for the storm sequence.

Principal photography began on October 9, 2002, and wrapped on March 7, 2003. The quick shoot was only marred by two accidents: as Sparrow steals Interceptor, three of the ropes attaching it to Dauntless did not break at first, and when they did snap, debris hit Depp's knee. He was not injured, and the way the incident played out on film made it look like Sparrow merely ducks. A more humorous accident was when the boat, which Sparrow was supposed to arrive in at Port Royal, sank. In October, the crew was shooting scenes at Rancho Palos Verdes. In December they were shooting at Saint Vincent and the Grenadines, and in January they were at the cavern set at Los Angeles. The script often changed with Elliott and Rossio on set, with additions such as Gibbs (Kevin McNally) telling Will how Sparrow allegedly escaped from an island—strapping two turtles together with rope made of his back hair—and Pryce was written into the climactic battle to keep some empathy for the audience.

Because of the quick schedule of the shoot, Industrial Light & Magic immediately began visual effects work. While the skeletal forms of the pirates revealed by moonlight take up relatively little screen-time, the crew knew their computer-generated forms had to convey the performances of the actors, or else the transition would not work. Each scene featuring them was shot twice: a reference plate with the actors, and then without them to add in the skeletons, an aesthetic complicated by Verbinski's decision to shoot the battles with handheld cameras. The actors had to perform their scenes again on the motion-capture stage. Filming was completed a mere four months before release, which caused Verbinski to spend 18-hour days in the editing room. There were 600 visual effects shots, 250 of which involved merely removing modern sailboats from the shot.

== Music ==
The musical score was composed by Klaus Badelt, conducted by Blake Neely and performed by the Hollywood Studio Symphony. Hans Zimmer served as the music producer. Seven other composers, including Geoff Zanelli and Ramin Djawadi, received credit for "additional music". Verbinski oversaw the score with Badelt and Zimmer, who headed 15 composers to finish it quickly.

Composer Alan Silvestri, who had collaborated with Verbinski on Mouse Hunt and The Mexican, was originally hired to write the film's score. Citing creative differences with Bruckheimer, Silvestri left the project before recording any material. Verbinski and Bruckheimer decided to go with Zimmer's team instead, who were frequent collaborators on their productions. Zimmer declined to do the bulk of the composing, as he was busy scoring The Last Samurai. As a result, he referred Verbinski to Klaus Badelt, a relatively new composer who had been a part of Remote Control Productions, known as Media Ventures at the time, for three years. At that point, Badelt had only composed a few films, including The Time Machine, The Recruit, K-19: The Widowmaker and Basic. As for Zimmer, he ended up collaborating with Badelt to write most of the score's primary themes. Zimmer said he wrote most of the music in the space of one night, and then recorded it in an all-synthesized demo credited to him. This demo presents three of the score's themes and motifs, concluding with an early version of "He's A Pirate" which differs from the final cue and includes a development of a melody Zimmer wrote for the score to Drop Zone.

The song Elizabeth Swann sings in the opening of the film as a child, and then later on the island marooned with Jack Sparrow, is called "Yo Ho (A Pirate's Life for Me)'". It was written by George Bruns with lyrics by Xavier "X" Atencio. It is the song heard throughout the attraction Pirates of the Caribbean in Disneyland and Magic Kingdom.

== Marketing ==
On August 22, 2002, IGN's FilmForce previewed the film's story after corresponding with an anonymous source prior the start of to shooting in October. The first teaser poster and trailer for film, at the time titled Pirates of the Caribbean, in which only one second of actual footage of the film was used, was attached to The Lord of the Rings: The Two Towers as well as Disney's official website on December 17, 2002. On April 6, 2003, the full trailer for the film, now bearing its subtitle The Curse of the Black Pearl, was shown on every Disney-owned TV station, as well as being available to watch online, with some videos featuring an introduction by Bloom.

== Release ==
=== Rating ===
Pirates of the Caribbean was the first film released under the Walt Disney Pictures banner to be rated PG-13 by the MPAA, for action/adventure violence. One executive noted that she found the film too intense for her five-year-old child.

=== Home media ===
The DVD and VHS editions of the film were released December 1, 2003, in the United Kingdom and December 2, 2003, in the United States, with 11 million copies sold in the first week, a record for live action video. It earned $235 million from DVD sales as of January 2004. This THX certified DVD release featured two discs, featuring three commentary tracks (Johnny Depp and Gore Verbinski; Jerry Bruckheimer, Keira Knightley and Jack Davenport; and the screenwriter team), various deleted scenes and documentaries, and a 1968 Disneyland episode about the theme park ride. A special three-disc edition was released in November 2004, in the United States and April 2005, in the United Kingdom.

A PSP release of the film followed on April 19, 2005. The high-definition Blu-ray Disc version of the film was released in May 2007. This movie was among the first to be sold at the iTunes music store. The Curse of the Black Pearl had its UK television premiere on Christmas Eve 2007 on BBC One at 20:30 and was watched by an estimated 7 million viewers.

In January 2022, The Curse of the Black Pearl was released on Ultra HD Blu-ray. However, the film's remaster was criticized by various online reviewers for being upscaled from 2K resolution, excessive application of digital noise reduction and various other shortcomings. A review by Martin Liebman of Blu-ray.com compared the release unfavorably to the previous 2007 Blu-ray release, stating: "The picture's grain has been reduced to a meshy, artificial appearance, looking frozen and flat and certainly less than genuine and flattering. Edge enhancement is in evidence. Textures have been scrubbed down and sharpened back up. Details appear waxy and lacking complexity [...] This is just a real clunker of a UHD image and one of the least impressive the format has seen."

=== 2023 re-release ===
As part of Disney's 100th anniversary, Pirates of the Caribbean: The Curse of the Black Pearl was re-released in theaters from July 7 to 20, 2023, on the film's own 20th anniversary.

=== Other Media ===
An immersive performance of the film by title Disney's Pirates of the Caribbean: The Immersive Adventure will open at Secret Cinema's Greenwich Peninsula venue in London in February 2027 for a limited ten-week run.

== Reception ==
=== Box office ===
Before its release, many journalists expected Pirates of the Caribbean would be a box-office bomb. The pirate genre had not been successful for many years, with Cutthroat Island (1995) being a notable failure. Depp was known mostly for starring in cult films, but Pirates of the Caribbean has been cited as launching his career as a leading man.

On its opening day, Pirates of the Caribbean collected $13.5 million. The film opened at number one ahead of Terminator 3: Rise of the Machines and The League of Extraordinary Gentlemen, grossing $46,630,690 in its opening weekend and $70,625,971 since its Wednesday launch. It went on to surpass Armageddon to have the highest July opening weekend for a Disney film. That record would be held until the debut of The Village a year later. The film also achieved the biggest opening weekend for Gore Verbinski and Johnny Depp's careers, replacing The Mexican and Sleepy Hollow respectively. The latter lasted for two years until 2005 when Tim Burton's Charlie and the Chocolate Factory surpassed it. The film would also outgross another pirate-themed film, Sinbad: Legend of the Seven Seas, while staying ahead of the summer's top earner, Disney's own Finding Nemo. It was overtaken by Bad Boys II during its second weekend, but still made $34 million. For its third weekend, it maintained second place behind Spy Kids 3-D: Game Over, generating $23.1 million and beating newcomers Lara Croft: Tomb Raider – The Cradle of Life and Seabiscuit. Pirates of the Caribbean eventually made its way to $654,264,015 worldwide ($305,413,918 domestically and $348,850,097 overseas), becoming the fourth-highest-grossing film of 2003, as well as joining Finding Nemo, Bruce Almighty, X2, and The Matrix Reloaded as one of the first five films to pass the $200 million mark in one summer season. Box Office Mojo estimates that the film sold over 50.64 million tickets in the US.

Internationally, Pirates of the Caribbean dominated for seven consecutive weekends at the box office, tying the record of Men in Black II at the time. Only three movies after that broke the record; its sequel, Dead Man's Chest, (with nine consecutive No. 1 weekends and ten in total), Avatar (with 11 consecutive No. 1 weekends) and The Smurfs (with eight consecutive No. 1 weekends). As of February 2021, it is the 141st-highest-grossing film of all time.

=== Critical response ===
On review aggregator Rotten Tomatoes, the film has an approval rating of 79% based on 216 reviews, and an average rating of 7.3/10. The site's critical consensus reads, "May leave you exhausted like the theme park ride that inspired it; however, you'll have a good time when it's over." At Metacritic, which assigns a weighted average rating to reviews, the film received an average score of 63 out of 100, based on reviews from 40 critics indicating generally favorable reviews. Audiences polled by CinemaScore gave the film an average grade of "A" on an A+ to F scale.

Alan Morrison of Empire thought Pirates of the Caribbean was the best blockbuster of the summer. He praised the film's humor, but was disappointed by its swashbuckling sequences. Duane Dudek of Milwaukee Journal Sentinel gave the film a three-out-of-four rating, describing it as "a fast-moving, wickedly funny and vividly mounted distraction that brings to mind adventure romps like The Mummy, The Princess Bride and The Mask of Zorro." Gregory Weinkauf of Dallas Observer said, "I love it, but much in the way I managed to love The Phantom Menace -- in spite of its bloat, swaggering self-importance and largely neutered characters."

The performance of Depp as Sparrow was particularly praised. Review site PopMatters applauded Depp's performance, saying "Ingenious and mesmerizing, Johnny Depp embodies the film's essential fantasy, that a pirate's life is exciting and unfettered." James Berardinelli of ReelViews also applauds Depp's performance by saying "Pirates of the Caribbean belongs to Johnny Depp...Take away Depp, and you're left with a derivative and dull motion picture."

Roger Ebert acclaimed the performances of Depp and Rush, and particularly that "It can be said that [Depp's] performance is original in its every atom. There has never been a pirate, or for that matter a human being, like this in any other movie... his behavior shows a lifetime of rehearsal." However, he felt the film went on for too long, a criticism shared by Kenneth Turan's negative review, feeling it "spends far too much time on its huge supporting cast of pirates (nowhere near as entertaining as everyone assumes) and on bloated adventure set pieces", despite having also enjoyed Depp's performance. Mark Kermode described the film as "a triumph of turgid theme-park hackery over the art of cinema".

In 2025, it was one of the films voted for the "Readers' Choice" edition of The New York Times' list of "The 100 Best Movies of the 21st Century," finishing at number 188.

=== Accolades ===
For his performance as Sparrow, Depp won several awards, including Outstanding Performance by a Male Actor in a Leading Role at the 10th Screen Actors Guild Awards, Best Male Performance at the 2004 MTV Movie Awards, and Best Actor at the 9th Empire Awards. Depp was also nominated for Best Actor – Motion Picture Musical or Comedy at the 61st Golden Globe Awards, Best Actor in a Leading Role at the 57th British Academy Film Awards, and Best Actor at the 76th Academy Awards, in which The Curse of the Black Pearl also received nominations for Best Makeup, Best Sound Editing, Best Sound Mixing, and Best Visual Effects. Awards won by Curse of the Black Pearl include Best Make-up/Hair at the 57th British Academy Film Awards, Saturn Award for Best Costumes, Golden Reel Award for Sound Editing, two VES Awards for Visual Effects, and the People's Choice Award for Favorite Motion Picture.

American Film Institute Lists

- AFI's 100 Years...100 Movies (10th Anniversary Edition) – Nominated
- AFI's 10 Top 10 – Fantasy – Nominated

== Sequels ==
Following the critical and commercial success of The Curse of the Black Pearl, Pirates of the Caribbean became a multimedia franchise encompassing films, books, video games, and theme park attractions. While The Curse of the Black Pearl was conceived as a standalone film, its writers Elliott and Rossio turned it into the first of a trilogy, in which two back-to-back sequels were released: Dead Man's Chest in 2006 and At World's End in 2007. Depp, Bloom, Knightley, Rush, and McNally returned for both films. A short film created as a prequel to The Curse of the Black Pearl, titled Tales of the Code: Wedlocked, was directed by James Ward Byrkit, who was a creative consultant for Gore Verbinski in the Pirates trilogy.

A fourth film, On Stranger Tides, was released in 2011. Following the release of The Curse of the Black Pearl, Disney approached author Tim Powers about optioning his novel On Stranger Tides for a Pirates film, a decision which was finalized near the end of filming the first two sequels. With the stories of both Will and Elizabeth resolved, and both Bloom and Knightley declining involvement in a fourth film, a stand-alone sequel was developed focusing on the further adventures of Sparrow. Depp, Rush, McNally, Greg Ellis, and Damian O'Hare reprised their roles from the previous films.

The fifth film, Dead Men Tell No Tales, was also developed as a standalone sequel and was released in 2017. Rossio was contracted to write the screenplay in 2011, but his script was rejected by 2012. The screenwriter Jeff Nathanson was hired, along with the directors Joachim Rønning and Espen Sandberg, who were quoted as being inspired by The Curse of the Black Pearl. Depp, Rush, McNally, Martin Klebba, Giles New and Angus Barnett returned to their roles from previous films. Despite the studio and producer guideline that Knightley and Bloom would not return, as well as the actors' past comments about not wanting to return, they made cameo appearances as their respective characters. An untitled sixth film is currently in development, with Jerry Bruckheimer returning as a producer.
