= Edward Charles Elliott =

Edward Charles Elliott is the full name of:

- Edward C. Elliott (1874–1960), American educator
- Charlie Elliott (jockey) (1904–1979), British jockey

== See also ==
- Edward Elliott (disambiguation)
