= On Stranger Tides =

1987 historical fantasy novel by Tim Powers

- First edition cover.
- Author: Tim Powers
- Cover artist: James Gurney
- Language: English
- Genre: Historical fantasy
- Publisher: Ace Books (Hardcover edition)
- Publication date: November 1987
- Publication place: United States
- Media type: Print (Hardback & Paperback)
- Pages: 325
- ISBN: 978-0-441-62683-0
- OCLC: 15661924

On Stranger Tides is a 1987 historical fantasy supernatural novel by American writer Tim Powers. It was nominated for the World Fantasy Award for Best Novel, and placed second in the annual Locus poll for best fantasy novel.

Set in the early 18th century, On Stranger Tides takes place during the Golden Age of Piracy, when puppeteer John Chandagnac sets out to reclaim an inheritance in Haiti and is waylaid by various buccaneers and pirates, only to become one himself. Now known as "Jack Shandy", Chandagnac encounters voodoo, zombies and the supernatural while on a quest for the fabled Fountain of Youth and rescues Englishwoman Elizabeth "Beth" Hurwood. Powers' novel features real historical figures like Blackbeard, Stede Bonnet, Woodes Rogers, and Juan Ponce de León alongside fictional ones.

The book was also the inspiration for the Monkey Island video game series by LucasArts and was loosely adapted for the fourth installment in the Pirates of the Caribbean film series, Pirates of the Caribbean: On Stranger Tides (2011).

== Plot ==
In 1718, French puppeteer John Chandagnac sails to Jamaica on the British ship Vociferous Carmichael. He aims to confront his uncle Sebastian, who has apparently stolen a fortune that rightfully belonged to John's father and could have prevented his poverty-induced death. On board, he meets an Englishwoman named Elizabeth "Beth" Hurwood, who complains that her erudite father Benjamin has abandoned his natural philosophy work and begun studying dark magic with her lecherous physician Leo Friend. The pirate sloop Jenny menaces the Carmichael, neutralizing its powerful cannons with vodun magic. Benjamin Hurwood and Friend begin shooting their fellow passengers, revealing them as allies of the pirates, as the assailants board and seize the Carmichael.

The pirates allow the passengers to leave on a rowboat, except for Beth, whom Hurwood requires for a vodun ritual, and Chandagnac, enrolled into the crew after wounding pirate captain Philip Davies. Not fond of long words, the pirates change John's name to Jack Shandy. The pirates head for New Providence Island to refit the Carmichael for piracy. On the way, they are captured by the Royal Navy, but Shandy breaks them out, thus ingratiating himself with the pirates. On New Providence, Shandy develops a proficiency for cooking and learns about vodun: unlike in the Old World, magic is very strong in the Caribbean, and pirates hire bocors to channel loas for healing, attacking and protection. Male and female sorcerers control different kinds of magic. Shandy also meets a rambling old sorcerer named Sawney, and develops an affection for Beth.

Hurwood has concluded an alliance with Blackbeard to lead him to the fabled Fountain of Youth in Florida, a powerful source of magic that will make Blackbeard immortal and allow Hurwood to resurrect his late wife—a process which involves evicting Beth's soul from her body. Davies and Shandy join him, fighting through a hostile, sentient jungle on the way. Davies defends himself from a curse by tossing enchanted soil into the air; Shandy takes note and saves some soil for himself. Shortly after he returns from the Fountain, Shandy finds that Friend has seized the Carmichael and abducted Beth. He gives pursuit in the Jenny, and fights off Friend's magical zombie crew, with assistance from the ghost ship Nuestra Señora de Lagrimas, which Friend accidentally summoned along with the ghost crew. Davies is killed and Hurwood takes Beth for himself after defeating Friend in a wizards' duel.

Not knowing where to find Beth, Shandy becomes a drunken wreck and accepts the King's pardon from Woodes Rogers, along with most of the pirates on New Providence, while Hurwood assumes a new identity as Ulysse Segundo and begins pirating. Meanwhile, Blackbeard is killed by the Navy, and Shandy receives an education in magic from old Sawney (actually a 200-year-old Juan Ponce de León) and a vision he gets after using the Fountain of Youth soil during a fight. A survivor of Segundo's raids relates the mannerisms of his undead crew, and Shandy recognizes them as the old Carmichael crew. Hearing that Segundo was last seen heading for Jamaica, Shandy sails on the Jenny, facing a storm and a mutiny on the way.

Using Sawney's cryptic tips—involving blood and the magic-dampening power of magnetized iron—he defeats Hurwood and destroys his wife's soul. In Jamaica, he barely escapes the Navy and fights his way to the house of Hurwood's accomplice, who turns out to be Sebastian. He frees Beth and makes his way to a harbor, where he is met by Blackbeard, now resurrected and assuming a new identity. Combining his male magic with Beth's female magic, he vanquishes Blackbeard and marries Beth. The book ends as he prepares for the voyage out of Jamaica.

== Characters ==
=== Original characters ===
- John Chandagnac/Jack Shandy - a puppeteer-turned-pirate.
- Philip Davies - a notorious pirate captain of the sloop Jenny.
- Benjamin Hurwood/Ulysses Segundo - a former professor who wants to resurrect his dead wife.
- Leo Friend - Hurwood's assistant.
- Elizabeth "Beth" Hurwood - Benjamin Hurwood's only daughter and Jack Shandy's love interest.
- Sebastian Chandagnac/Joshua Hicks - John Chandagnac's treacherous uncle.
- Skank - Jack Shandy's quartermaster.

=== Historical characters ===
- Johnny Con/Edward "Ed" Thatch/Blackbeard/Edmund Morcilla - a pirate, known as the "hunsi kanzo", a boy deeply educated as an assistant to an old English magician before becoming a full-fledged Voodoo sorcerer, and captain of the Queen Anne's Revenge with a zombie servant who is a boatman.
- Stede Bonnet - Blackbeard's partner and captain of the sloop Revenge.
- "Governor" Sawney/Juan Ponce de León - the former governor of New Providence Island, revealed to be the immortal discoverer of the Fountain of Youth.
- Anne Bonny - a female pirate in Nassau.
- Robert Maynard - a Royal Navy lieutenant who is responsible for Blackbeard's first death at Ocracoke Inlet.

== Background ==
Growing up as an Orange County citizen, Tim Powers and his wife visited Disneyland a lot as kids, with Powers specifically remembering when the Pirates of the Caribbean ride was brand new. Powers believed he had the ride, among other inspirations, in mind when writing On Stranger Tides. He wrote it after Lester del Rey had rejected a number of Powers' books, including The Anubis Gates. Powers wrote On Stranger Tides thinking del Rey would like "pirate adventure, zombies, Fountain of Youth, sea battles, cutlass fights...and he didn't like it either." In his research for the book, Powers found that the supernatural and pirates were a comfortable fit. The book features the history and myth of Juan Ponce de León and the Fountain of Youth, and depicts Blackbeard's death at Ocracoke Inlet and beheading by Lieutenant Robert Maynard. During his research, Powers was puzzled by Blackbeard's behavior, and found a context in which his peculiar behaviors were not lunacy, but instead were shrewd and clever. On Stranger Tides was published in 1987.

In the process of writing his book, Powers researched voodoo magic, historical pirate profiles, and history. Asked of what inspired his writing of On Stranger Tides, Powers stated:

I was already hooked into using real historical places for settings. And so I thought, you know you loved Treasure Island...And I thought I bet you can set a nice fantasy story in among the pirates, Blackbeard, that crowd. So I read a million books (that is probably fifteen books) about that particular crowd of pirates that were in the Caribbean in 1718 like Stede Bonnet, Blackbeard, and Anne Bonny.
What I always do when I'm writing a book is first I read all the history and biographies and things like that that I can find. And I look for stuff that's too cool not to use. "Ooh that's neat. Look at that. I like that." And I'll write it down. And then I'll find something else and say, "Oh wow this is great. You got to have a scene happening in this place. Oh you gotta use this guy." Eventually, I'll have twenty or thirty things that are too cool not to use. And it's kind of fun then because you say, "Well okay, here's twenty or thirty parts of your book. You just have to connect the dots." And so I thought, "Ok, what was Blackbeard really up to?"

== Reception ==
Orson Scott Card states that the novel "is as good as storytelling ever gets," adding that "Powers writes in a clean, elegant style that illuminates without slowing down the tale. The story promises marvels and horrors, and delivers them all." David Langford wrote that On Stranger Tides "immediately hooks you and drags you along in sympathy with one central character's appalling misfortunes on the Spanish Main, [and] escalates from there to closing mega-thrills so determinedly spiced that your palate is left almost jaded."

Jack Adrian wrote that "Tim Powers has further refertilized the Sabatini swashbuckler," and describes the novel as a skillful blend of "high seas adventure with sorcery and black magic."

== Influence on other works ==
=== Books ===
Kim Newman based the name of a vampire in his Anno Dracula series on the main character of On Stranger Tides.

=== Video games ===
Ron Gilbert has been widely quoted that the Monkey Island series of adventure games was inspired by Disneyland's Pirates of the Caribbean ride. However, he stated in a blog that the ride was mainly his inspiration for the ambiance of the series, while his true inspiration was On Stranger Tides.

=== Films ===
==== Pirates of the Caribbean ====
In 2007, after the successful opening weekend of the third Pirates of the Caribbean film, At World's End, Walt Disney Studios Chairman Dick Cook said he was interested in a fourth film. The Los Angeles Times also reported that producer Jerry Bruckheimer already had rights to a book that could end up as another installment, though had not confirmed what book it was. On September 11, 2009, Walt Disney Pictures announced that the fourth installment would be titled Pirates of the Caribbean: On Stranger Tides. The announcement had fueled speculation among those familiar with Tim Powers' novel On Stranger Tides that the fourth Pirates movie would follow the plot of the novel. It was later revealed that the idea to adapt On Stranger Tides came close to the end of filming the Pirates trilogy, in which screenwriters Ted Elliott and Terry Rossio found the novel and brought it up to Bruckheimer as an idea to option the book for the new chapter. In a 2011 interview, Tim Powers stated that Disney wanted the film rights as early as before the release of the second Pirates film, Dead Man's Chest, though he thought they already used elements beforehand. Disney would not buy the rights to Powers' novel until they started filming their fourth movie. Rossio mentioned how Disney was hit with at least six plagiarism lawsuits for the first Pirates of the Caribbean movie, as well as informal accusations of stealing elements from the Monkey Island video game series and Powers' novel.

In January 2010, Disney announced that the film would be released on May 20, 2011. Before the film began production, it was speculated that Jack Sparrow would replace Jack Shandy as the story's protagonist. Tim Powers stated that the Fountain of Youth would definitely be in the film because it was teased in At World's End, but also said that Sparrow and Shandy are "totally different characters", and that Hector Barbossa and his fictionalized Blackbeard might overlap. On March 22, 2010, Jerry Bruckheimer confirmed that both Barbossa and Blackbeard (portrayed by Ian McShane) would be in the film, with Blackbeard as the villain. Additionally, Penélope Cruz would play Angelica, Blackbeard's daughter. Unlike the book, where Blackbeard dies and returns from the dead, Blackbeard in the film would be a still-living Blackbeard.

While making the fourth film, screenwriter Terry Rossio stated Tim Powers' novel was an inspiration for characters, theme, settings, and basic storyline. He also stated that he and co-writer Ted Elliot had considered using Blackbeard and the Fountain of Youth in the story before reading the book, "but whenever you say those words, Powers' novel comes to mind. There was no way we could work in that field without going into territory Tim had explored." However, they denied that it would be a straight version of the novel: "Blackbeard came from the book, and in the book there is a daughter character, too. But Jack Sparrow is not in the book, nor is Barbossa. So I wouldn't call this an adaptation." Powers himself stated that he never consulted with the writers and initially thought they weren't using much of his book at all aside from Blackbeard and the Fountain of Youth. Rossio stated that Blackbeard, Angelica, and the Fountain are examples of how they integrated Powers' book into the film.
