= Edward Elliot =

Edward Elliot may refer to:

- Edward Elliot (judge) (died 1866), judge in colonial Madras
- Edward Elliot (architect) (1828–1901), Canadian architect
- Edward Locke Elliot (1850–?), British Army general in India
- Edward Hay Mackenzie Elliot, British soldier and private secretary

== See also ==
- Edward Eliot (disambiguation)
- Edward Elliott (disambiguation)
