= Pirates of the Caribbean: On Stranger Tides =

2011 film by Rob Marshall

- Theatrical release poster
- Directed by: Rob Marshall
- Written by: Ted Elliott; Terry Rossio
- Based on: Characters by; Ted Elliott; Terry Rossio; Stuart Beattie; Jay Wolpert; Walt Disney's Pirates of the Caribbean; On Stranger Tides by Tim Powers
- Produced by: Jerry Bruckheimer
- Starring: Johnny Depp; Penélope Cruz; Ian McShane; Kevin R. McNally; Geoffrey Rush
- Cinematography: Dariusz Wolski
- Edited by: David Brenner; Wyatt Smith
- Music by: Hans Zimmer
- Production companies: Walt Disney Pictures; Jerry Bruckheimer Films
- Distributed by: Walt Disney Studios; Motion Pictures
- Release dates: May 7, 2011 (Disneyland Resort); May 20, 2011 (United States)
- Running time: 136 minutes
- Country: United States
- Language: English
- Budget: $410.6 million (gross); $378.5 million (net)
- Box office: $1.046 billion

Pirates of the Caribbean: On Stranger Tides is a 2011 American swashbuckler film and the fourth installment in the Pirates of the Caribbean film series, following At World's End (2007). The film was directed by Rob Marshall, and written by Ted Elliott and Terry Rossio, loosely based on the 1987 novel On Stranger Tides by Tim Powers. Johnny Depp, Kevin R. McNally and Geoffrey Rush reprise their roles from the previous films, with Penélope Cruz and Ian McShane joining the cast. The story follows the eccentric pirate Captain Jack Sparrow on a quest for the Fountain of Youth after crossing paths with Angelica, a mysterious woman from his past, and being forced aboard the Queen Anne's Revenge, the ship of the legendary pirate Blackbeard.

On Stranger Tides was produced by Walt Disney Pictures and Jerry Bruckheimer Films, and distributed by Walt Disney Studios Motion Pictures. During the back-to-back production of Dead Man's Chest (2006) and At World's End, writers Elliott and Rossio first learned of Powers' novel and considered it a good starting point for a new film in the series. Pre-production started after the end of the 2007–2008 Writers Guild of America strike, with Depp collaborating with the writers on the story design. Gore Verbinski did not return as director from previous films reportedly due to his commitment with Rango (2011). Principal photography lasted for 106 days between June and November 2010, with locations in Hawaii, the United Kingdom, Puerto Rico and California. Filming employed 3D cameras, and ten companies were involved with the film's visual effects. Following inflated production costs which ballooned the net budget to $379 million, the film was the most expensive film ever made at the time of its release.

On Stranger Tides premiered at the Disneyland Resort on May 7, 2011, and was theatrically released in the United States on May 20. The film received mixed reviews from critics and grossed over $1 billion worldwide, breaking several box office records and becoming the third highest-grossing film of 2011. A fifth film, Dead Men Tell No Tales, was released in 2017.

== Plot ==
Around 1750, (Note: According to production designer John Myhre, the filmmakers of On Stranger Tides picked the date of 1750, or in the range of the mid-1700s.) some 21 years after Captain Jack Sparrow acquired Sao Feng's map to find the Fountain of Youth and the Black Pearl stolen by Hector Barbossa, (Note: As depicted in Pirates of the Caribbean: At World's End (2007). In addition to the 1750 setting of On Stranger Tides, Pirates of the Caribbean: Dead Men Tell No Tales (2017) takes place roughly 10 years after At World's End as well as in the year 1751.) a castaway found in the ocean was brought to King Ferdinand at Cádiz, holding a ship's logbook of Ponce de León, who died 200 years earlier searching for the Fountain. Meanwhile, Jack rescues his first mate, Joshamee Gibbs, from execution in London, only to get captured. Gibbs takes Jack's map, while Jack himself meets King George II, who wants him to guide an expedition to locate the Fountain before the Spanish Navy, led by The Spaniard. Barbossa joins the expedition, now as a privateer wearing a peg leg having lost it in the fight along with the Pearl, believed to be sunk. (Note: Screenwriter Terry Rossio released his unproduced screenplay for Pirates of the Caribbean: Dead Men Tell No Tales (2017), which includes additional information in extensive footnotes. Pertaining to On Stranger Tides, Rossio notes that Barbossa does not know about the Black Pearl in a bottle in the fourth film, though Barbossa later shows knowledge in the fifth film.) Jack escapes, leading Barbossa to later recruit Gibbs, who memorizes Jack's map before burning it to save his life, and they set sail aboard the British Navy ship HMS Providence.

Captain Teague, Jack's father, tells him that the Profane Ritual is required to use the Fountain. Jack also hears of another Jack Sparrow recruiting a crew. The impostor is Angelica, Jack's former lover and daughter of Blackbeard, who practices voodoo magic as a brujo, and Jack is shanghaied aboard the Queen Anne's Revenge. The crew includes Philip, (Note: While credited as "Philip" in the film, "Philip Swift" is the character's full name, according to the film's script, visual guide, and actor Sam Claflin,) a captured missionary, and zombie officers. Although Jack incites the human crew to mutiny, Blackbeard subdues the mutineers with a sword that allows him to control ships at sea. Blackbeard wants to find the Fountain because of a prophesied death by a one-legged man. Jack also learns from Angelica that the ritual requires water from the Fountain, a mermaid's tear, and two silver chalices located on Ponce de León's ship, the Santiago; both chalices are drunk, and the person who drinks the water with the tear gets all the years of life from the other. Angelica also shows Jack Blackbeard's collection of captured, miniaturized ships in bottles, including the Black Pearl.

The Revenge sails to Whitecap Bay, where Blackbeard's crew captures the mermaid Syrena. Barbossa, Gibbs, and some of the British crew continue on foot after the Providence is attacked by mermaids. Syrena's tail becomes legs after being out of water; seeing that she cannot walk, Philip offers to carry Syrena. After their newfound love is used to extract the mermaid's tear, Syrena is left to die. Blackbeard sends Jack to get the chalices, taking the latter's magic compass. Jack and Barbossa meet on the Santiago, but find the chalices have been taken by the Spanish. Before retrieving the chalices, Barbossa reveals his true agenda: a desire for revenge against Blackbeard, detailing the attack on the Black Pearl, which Barbossa truly believes to be sunk, which led to him cutting off his leg. Jack returns to Blackbeard, giving him the chalices in exchange for Jack's compass, which Jack sends off with Gibbs.

All parties locate the Fountain of Youth, which leads to a battle, in which Barbossa uses a sword he poisoned using "poisonous toads" to stab Blackbeard. Angelica cuts her hand on the poisoned blade. The Spaniard throws the chalices into a deep pool and, believing it is an abomination against God, orders his men to destroy the Fountain. In the chaos, Philip frees Syrena, who gives the chalices to Jack. Filling the chalices with the remaining drops of water from the Fountain, adding Syrena's tear, Jack tricks Blackbeard into drinking the chalice lacking the tear; this earns his and Angelica's enmity. Angelica is healed, whilst Blackbeard dies, while Syrena returns to an injured Philip and, after she forgives him, they kiss and return underwater. (Note: Both Philip and Syrena return in Terry Rossio's unproduced screenplay for Pirates of the Caribbean: Dead Men Tell No Tales (2017), though both characters do not appear in the final version of the film.)

Barbossa claims Blackbeard's ship, crew, and sword for his own, and returns to a life of piracy. Meanwhile, Jack maroons Angelica on a small island, expressing his love and mistrust. Jack reunites with Gibbs, who uses the compass to locate the Revenge and retrieve the Black Pearl in a bottle. As they figure out how to get the Pearl out, Jack tells Gibbs he is determined to continue living the pirate's life.

In the post-credits scene, the voodoo doll of Jack created by Blackbeard washes ashore and is picked up by Angelica, who smiles.

== Cast ==
- Johnny Depp as Captain Jack Sparrow: Legendary pirate, former captain of the Black Pearl.
- Geoffrey Rush as Captain Hector Barbossa: Legendary pirate-turned-privateer, Jack's rival, former captain of the Black Pearl, and now captain of the HMS Providence.
- Ian McShane as Blackbeard: Legendary pirate, captain of the Queen Anne's Revenge, and Angelica's father. McShane was previously considered to play Davy Jones (later portrayed by Bill Nighy) in Pirates of the Caribbean: Dead Man's Chest.
- Penélope Cruz as Angelica: Jack's former love interest, first mate and daughter of Blackbeard. As the production date for On Stranger Tides neared, Penélope Cruz found out she was pregnant with her first child, a son with Javier Bardem. Director Rob Marshall and producer Jerry Bruckheimer worried Cruz might back out, despite Bruckheimer himself saying it did not affect production, but Cruz remained committed to the film. To accommodate her condition, the schedule was adjusted to shoot more of Cruz's scenes before she started to show. The costume designer created an elastic corset to allow the actress to move more freely, and Cruz's outfits were constantly being altered. "I just had a new fitting every three weeks," Cruz said. "We kept having fittings, but they were very, very kind to do it." Cruz did all of her close-up action scenes, though her pregnancy forced the filmmakers to use a stunt double on more of the wide shots. In September 2010, after it became noticeable on set at Puerto Rico, representatives of Cruz and Bardem confirmed she was four-and-a-half months pregnant. After that, Penélope only filmed Angelica's close-ups while her sister Mónica did all of Angelica's long-distance shots.
- Kevin McNally as Joshamee Gibbs: Jack's loyal friend, and former first mate of the Black Pearl.
- Sam Claflin as Philip: A missionary, kept prisoner aboard Blackbeard's ship, and Syrena's love interest. Although the character's full name is "Philip Swift", he is only named and credited as "Philip" in the film.
- Àstrid Bergès-Frisbey as Syrena: A mermaid captured by Blackbeard's crew, and Philip's love interest.
- Stephen Graham as Scrum: A self-serving crew member of the Queen Anne's Revenge.
- Richard Griffiths as King George II
- Greg Ellis as Lt. Cmdr. Theodore Groves: Barbossa's second-in-command aboard the Providence. Ellis reprises his role as an officer under the command of Commodore James Norrington in The Curse of the Black Pearl and Lord Cutler Beckett in At World's End.
- Óscar Jaenada as The Spaniard: King Ferdinand's most trusted agent.
- Keith Richards appears as Captain Teague, legendary pirate and Jack Sparrow's father, reprising his role from At World's End.
- Damian O'Hare reprises his role as Lieutenant Gillette from The Curse of the Black Pearl.
- King George's ministers include Roger Allam as Prime Minister Henry Pelham and Anton Lesser as Lord John Carteret.
- Other Spanish characters include Sebastian Armesto as King Ferdinand and Juan Carlos Vellido as a Spanish captain.
- Judi Dench has a cameo appearance as a society lady who encounters Jack Sparrow in a carriage.

Hannah Walters, Stephen Graham's wife, portrayed a Captain's Daughter Tavern wench.

== Production ==
=== Development ===
By September 2006, Mark Zoradi, president of the Walt Disney Motion Pictures Group was quoted as saying, "The third film... will conclude the initial Pirates trilogy, though it is unlikely to be the last Pirates sequel." Terry Rossio said in 2007 that a fourth film was possible, and producer Jerry Bruckheimer expressed interest in a spin-off. Director Gore Verbinski concurred that "all of the stories set in motion by the first film have been resolved. If there ever were another Pirates of the Caribbean film, I would start fresh and focus on the further adventures of Captain Jack Sparrow."

Shortly before the premiere of Pirates of the Caribbean: At World's End, Bruckheimer stated it was the end of the Pirates of the Caribbean trilogy, but the idea of a spin-off was still possible. After the film's successful opening weekend, Dick Cook, then Chairman of the Walt Disney Studios, said he was interested in a fourth installment. Los Angeles Times also reported that rights to a book were bought. Johnny Depp was expected to reprise his role as Captain Jack Sparrow. Ted Elliott and Terry Rossio had started working on a script in 2007, but they were interrupted by the 2007–2008 Writers Guild of America strike, and only resumed in mid-2008.

The fourth film was first announced on September 28, 2008, during a Disney event at the Kodak Theatre with Johnny Depp and Walt Disney Studios chairman Dick Cook, with Depp in full Captain Jack Sparrow attire, while also wearing the Lone Ranger mask to announce his involvement in a Lone Ranger movie. In June 2009, Bruckheimer indicated Disney would prefer the fourth installment of Pirates to be released before Lone Ranger film, which was being worked on for release in the summer of 2010. He hoped original Pirates director Gore Verbinski would return for the fourth film, as his BioShock film adaptation had been put on hold. As Verbinski was unavailable due to his commitment with Rango the same year, Bruckheimer suggested Rob Marshall, whom he considered a "premiere filmmaker", stating that "Every film [Marshall] made I thought was unique and different". On July 21, 2009, Marshall accepted the job, because of the "whole new story line and set of characters. It felt new, and that was important to me." Marshall's involvement was not reported until August. Marshall said the film provided him a long-awaited opportunity to work with Depp, and that his directing was helped by his experience as a choreographer—"the action sequences felt like big production numbers". "I really had one criteria for signing on. And that was a story I could actually follow."

On September 11, 2009, during a presentation at Disney's D23 Expo, Cook and Johnny Depp, in full Captain Jack Sparrow costume, made the announcement that a fourth Pirates film was in development for a summer 2011 release. The title was announced as Pirates of the Caribbean: On Stranger Tides, later revealed to have been taken from Tim Powers's 1987 novel On Stranger Tides. Cook resigned in September 2009 after working for Disney for over 38 years. Depp's faith in Pirates of the Caribbean: On Stranger Tides was somewhat shaken after the resignation, with Depp explaining that "There's a fissure, a crack in my enthusiasm at the moment. It was all born in that office". Depp also explained Cook was one of the few who accepted his portrayal of Jack Sparrow: "When things went a little sideways on the first Pirates movie and others at the studio were less than enthusiastic about my interpretation of the character, Dick was there from the first moment. He trusted me". Regardless, on January 6, 2010, Disney announced that the film would be released on May 20, 2011.

Director Rob Marshall visited the Pirates of the Caribbean ride in Disneyland for inspiration, eventually paying homage with a skeleton holding a magnifying glass in Ponce de León's ship. Another ride reference scene featuring "Old Bill", the pirate who tries to share his rum with a cat, was also filmed but cut. Pintel and Ragetti were originally supposed to make an appearance, but director Rob Marshall opted out of the idea as he feared their roles would be cut.

=== Writing ===
During the production of Pirates of the Caribbean: Dead Man's Chest and At World's End, writers Ted Elliott and Terry Rossio discovered Tim Powers's 1987 novel On Stranger Tides, which they considered a good foundation on which to base "a new chapter" in the Pirates series. Disney bought the rights to the novel in April 2007. In 2009, after the announcement of the film's title, which led to speculation in regards to his book, Powers insisted that Jack Sparrow and his book's main character Jack Shandy "are totally different characters", but that it was possible that "they might overlap" his fictionalized version of Blackbeard and the film franchise character Hector Barbossa. Additionally. Powers felt certain the Fountain of Youth was the only thing they would hold on to due to the film's ending. Rossio stated that he and Elliot had considered using Blackbeard and the Fountain of Youth in the story, "but whenever you say those words, Powers's novel comes to mind. There was no way we could work in that field without going into territory Tim had explored." However, while taking inspiration from Powers' novel, Rossio denied that the film would be a straight version of the novel: "Blackbeard came from the book, and in the book, there is a daughter character, too. But Jack Sparrow is not in the book, nor is Barbossa. So I wouldn't call this an adaptation". Rossio declared the script for On Stranger Tides was written to be a standalone film, "kind of a James Bond sort of thing", instead of the "designed to be a trilogy" structure of the previous installments. They hoped to "design a story that would support new characters," knowing that previous arcs were over. "The main guideline was to create a stand-alone story rather than a continuation of the trilogy, or the start of a new one. And then of course the Tim Powers book, 'On Stranger Tides,' was a huge inspiration for characters, theme, settings, and basic storyline." Bruckheimer added that there was a decision to "streamline the story a little bit, make it a little simpler and not have as many characters to follow", as the number of characters and subplots in At World's End caused the film to have an unwieldy length. The duo decided to employ another sea myth alluded to in the previous episodes: mermaids, which are briefly referenced as "suck-you-byes, female demons that weirdly and erotically occupied the last hours of men marooned on barren islands" in the fourth chapter of the book. The mermaids' role expanded in the film's script, which included a vast attack sequence.

Depp was deeply involved with the story design, frequently meeting the writers to show what he was interested in doing, and in the words of Rossio, being "involved in coming up with storylines, connecting characters, creating moments that we would then fashion, shape and then go back." Among Depp's suggestions were turning Philip into a missionary and having a Spanish contingent following the protagonists. Afterwards, Rob Marshall and executive producer John DeLuca met Rossio and Elliot and did alterations of their own, including building the female lead.

=== Casting ===
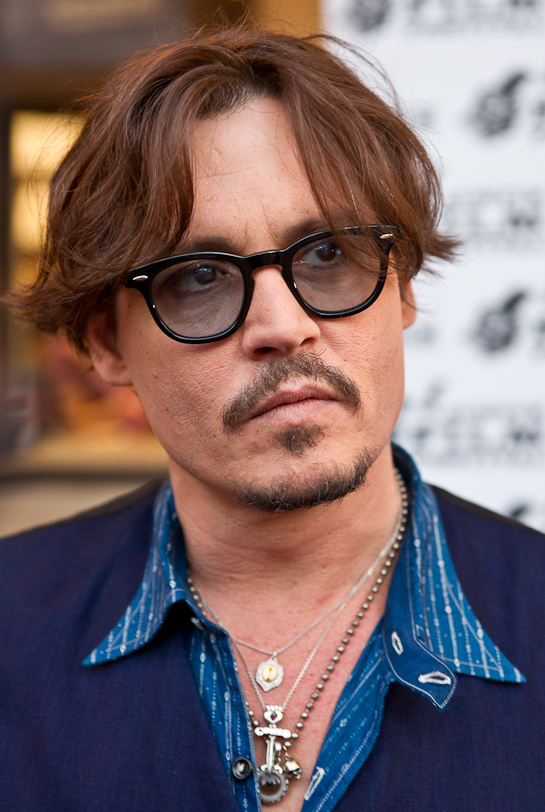
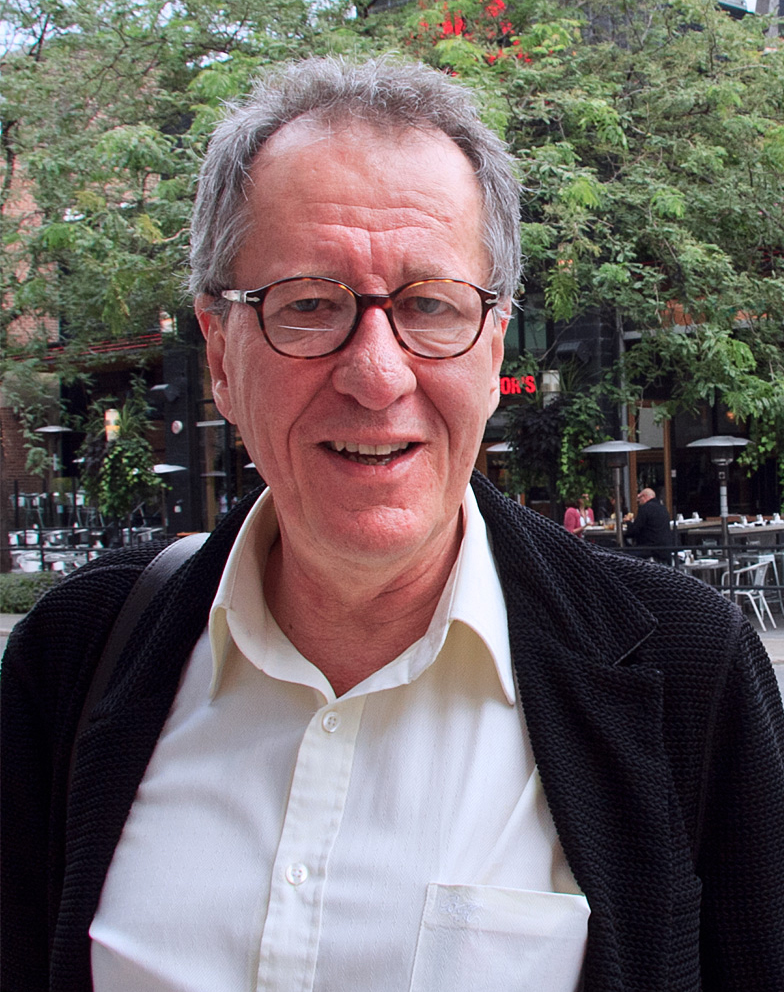
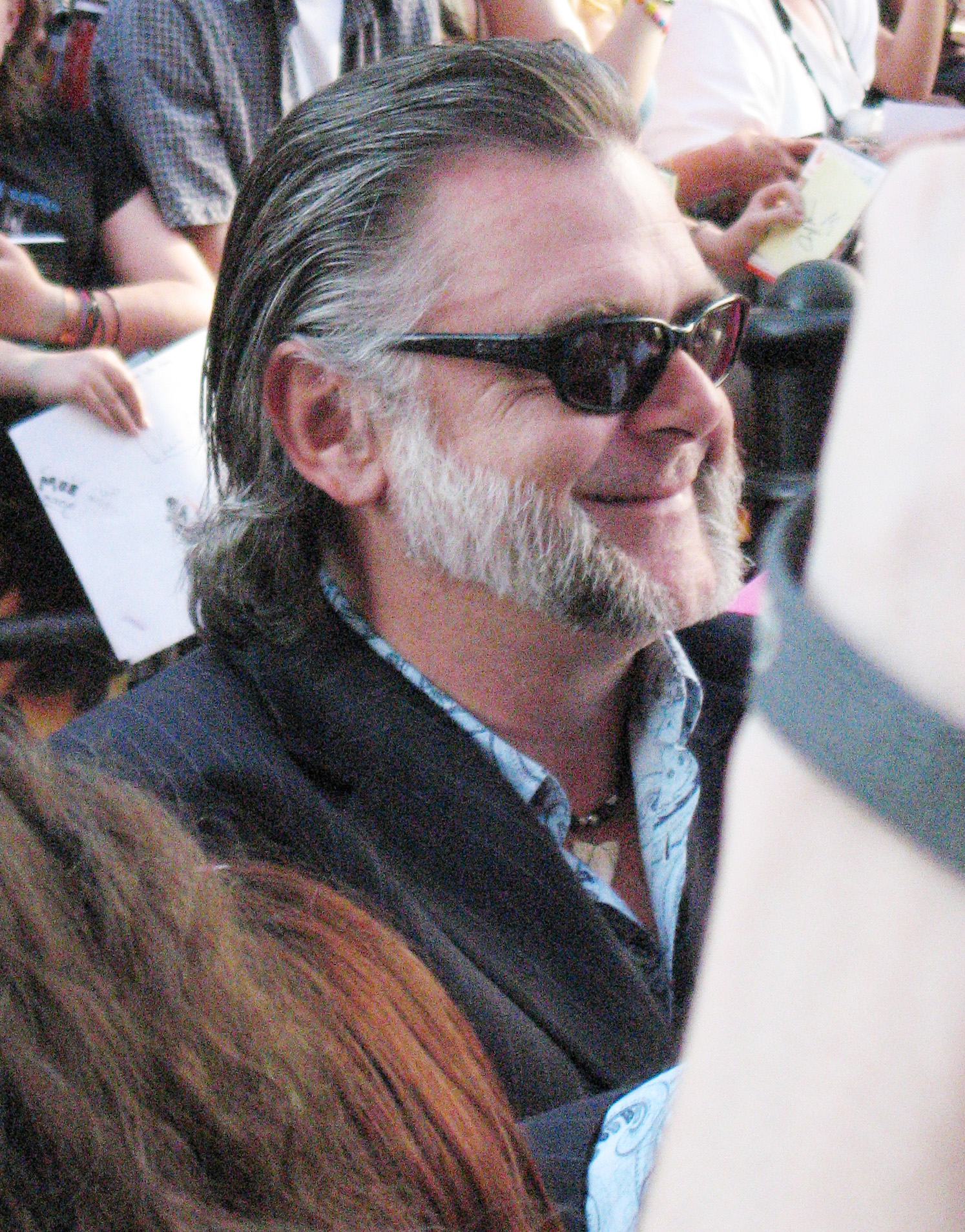
Top to bottom: Johnny Depp, Geoffrey Rush, and Kevin McNally who reprised their roles from the previous films as Captain Jack Sparrow, Captain Hector Barbossa, and Joshamee Gibbs respectively.

Depp signed on to return as Captain Jack Sparrow in September 2008, saying that he would come back if the script was good. Almost a year later, it was reported that Disney announced that Depp would be paid $55.5 million for his role, realizing that without him the franchise would be "dead and buried." Geoffrey Rush expressed interest in returning to his role as Hector Barbossa. Bruckheimer later confirmed the presence of Rush as Barbossa, and Kevin McNally as Joshamee Gibbs. Rush was positive on Barbossa having lost a leg, as he considered the disability made him "angrier, more forceful and resilient as a character", and had to work with the stunt team for an accurate portrayal of the limp and usage of crutch, particularly during sword fighting scenes. While the production team considered a prop pegleg to be put over Rush's leg, the tight schedule caused it to be replaced with a blue sock that was replaced digitally, with a knob on the shoe to give Rush a reference for his walk. Three other actors from the previous films returned: Greg Ellis as Lt. Theodore Groves, Damian O'Hare as Lt. Gilette, and Keith Richards as Captain Teague. On reprising his cameo role from At World's End, Richards and Depp tried to persuade Mick Jagger to join Richards as a pirate elder.

Previous cast members Orlando Bloom (Will Turner) and Keira Knightley (Elizabeth Swann) repeatedly stated that they would not reprise their roles, declining interest in returning to the Pirates series as they both thought the storyline involving their characters had gone as far as it could in At World's End. On August 1, 2009, Bill Nighy expressed his desire to return as Davy Jones, who died in the previous film At World's End, citing a possibility to resurrect the character. On February 5, 2010, Mackenzie Crook also stated he would not be reprising his role of Ragetti, stating, "They haven't asked me. But actually I don't mind that at all. I'm a fan of the first one especially and I think the trilogy we've made is great. I'd almost like them to leave it there."

New cast members include Ian McShane, who plays the notorious pirate and primary antagonist of the film, Blackbeard, and Penélope Cruz, who plays Angelica, Jack Sparrow's love interest. According to Marshall, McShane was chosen because "he can play something evil but there's always humor behind it as well" and the actor accepted the job due to both the "very funny and charming" script and the opportunity to work with Marshall. The beard took one hour and a half to get applied, and McShane likened the character's costume to "a real biker pirate—it's all black leather." Marshall said Cruz was the only actress considered for the role, as she fit the description as "an actress who could not only go toe to toe with Johnny and match him, but also needed to be all the things that Jack Sparrow is in a way. She needed to be funny and clever and smart and crafty and beautiful", and invited her for the role as they wrapped the production of Nine. The actress spent two months working out and learning fencing for the role. Cruz was pregnant during filming, leading the costume department to redesign her wardrobe to be more elastic and the producers to hire her sister Mónica Cruz to double for Penélope in risky scenes. Depp recommended Stephen Graham, who worked with him in Public Enemies, to play Scrum, a Machiavellian pirate and sidekick to Jack Sparrow, and Richard Griffiths for the role of King George II, as Depp was a fan of Griffiths' work on Withnail and I. Sam Claflin, a recent drama school graduate with television experience, was chosen to play the missionary Philip Swift, and British actor Paul Bazely also joined the cast. Spanish news website El País reported that the film had four Spanish actors: Cruz, Àstrid Bergès-Frisbey, Óscar Jaenada, and Juan Carlos Vellido. Jaenada was picked for both his work in The Losers and a recommendation by Cruz.

Casting for mermaids required the actresses to have natural breasts—no implants. As Bruckheimer explained to EW, "I don't think they had breast augmentation in the 1700s, [...] So it's natural for casting people to say, 'We want real people.'" Marshall invited Spanish-French actress Àstrid Bergès-Frisbey to play Syrena after seeing her in a French magazine article on up-and-coming actresses. Bergès-Frisbey had to take lessons of English, swimming and breath control for the role. The rest of the mermaid portrayers, such as Australian supermodel Gemma Ward, were chosen for having "exotic sense, an otherworldly sensibility, but also under those layers a deadly quality", according to Marshall, and had to take swimming lessons to learn movements such as the dolphin and eggbeater kicks.

=== Filming ===
With the new director in Rob Marshall, there was a slight change in tone from the previous films, a much keener eye on history, and a clearer idea of when it takes place. Terry Rossio considers this shift in tone to actually, including some more historical references, be very much in keeping with the franchise. According to production designer John Myhre, the filmmakers got together in a room and picked a date of 1750, "and if it was a bit earlier, or just a hair later, maybe we'd do what was most fun for the storytelling, but we're in that range, we're saying mid-1700s."

Principal photography began on June 14, 2010, in Hawaii, with a synopsis released. Filming was moved to California in August 2010, primarily at the Long Beach shore and a recreation of Whitecap Bay done in the Universal Studios backlot, as the original Hawaiian location on Halona Cove was plagued with strong tides. After a brief shoot in Puerto Rico, with locations in both Palomino Island and the Fort of San Cristóbal in San Juan, production moved to the United Kingdom in September, where principal photography wrapped on November 18 after 106 days of shooting. Locations included Hampton Court Palace in London, Knole House in Kent, and Old Royal Naval College at Greenwich. Interiors were shot at London's Pinewood Studios, and a replica of an 18th-century London street was built on the backlot alongside the soundstages. The producers also considered using New Orleans as a location. In October, security was breached at the UK site when a celebrity impersonator gained access to filming at the Old Royal Naval College by dressing up as Captain Jack.

After the joint production of Dead Man's Chest and At World's End cost over $300 million, Disney decided to give a lower budget to the fourth installment. Many costs had to be cut, including moving primary production to Hawaii and London, where tax credits are more favorable, and having a shorter shooting schedule and fewer scenes featuring special effects compared to At World's End. The tighter schedule—according to Bruckheimer, "We had a 22-week post, and for a picture like this, with almost 1,200 visual effects shots, it's usually 40 weeks"—meant that Marshall supervised editing of sequences during filming. The British financial statements of the film revealed total expenditures of £240.7 million ($410.6 million) by 2013, with Disney receiving a rebate of $32.1 million from the British government, making Pirates of the Caribbean: On Stranger Tides the most expensive film ever made to date.

Bruckheimer said the decision to film in 3D was made due to its being "immersive filmmaking; I think it makes you part of the actual filming because you're part of the screen." Bruckheimer described it as the first major "exterior movie" to be shot in 3D, as Avatar was mostly done in sound stages. At first Marshall was not much interested in 3D, but the director eventually considered it a film that could benefit from the format. "You are on an adventure and with the 3D experience you are inside that adventure." While the original plan was to add 3D effects during post-production, the decision was made to shoot digitally with 3D cameras. Only one sequence was shot conventionally and needed a 3D conversion. The cameras were improved versions of the ones James Cameron developed for Avatar, which were made more compact for extra mobility. This meant the cameras could be brought into locations such as the Hawaiian jungle.

Queen Anne's Revenge was built atop Sunset, the same ship used to depict Black Pearl in previous installments. In February 2010, Sunset was sailed from Long Beach to a shipyard in Hawaii for the reforms, where a big concern was to make it imposing, with three stories, without sacrificing actual seakeeping. According to Myhre, given Blackbeard was meant to be the meanest pirate to appear in the series, the look for Queen Anne's Revenge was ominous, with sails dyed blood red, various elements on fire, and a decoration based on skulls and bones (drawing inspiration from the Sedlec Ossuary in Czech Republic). Damage from cannon fire was also added to show that "not only Blackbeard was a dying man, but his ship is also a dying ship". The ship's figurehead also drew inspiration from Blackbeard's pirate flag. The replica ship HMS Surprise was used for Barbossa's ship, HMS Providence, and all the scenes aboard Providence were shot on the Long Beach shore as Surprise could not be sailed to Hawaii. Over 50 designs were considered for the Fountain of Youth, with the final one representing a temple built by an ancient civilization around the Fountain, which itself was located in a round rocky structure to represent "the circle of life". The locations leading up to the Fountain were shot in the Hawaiian islands of Kauai and Oahu, but the Fountain itself was built at the 007 Stage on Pinewood.

=== Effects ===
On Stranger Tides employed 1,112 shots of computer-generated imagery, which were done by ten visual effects companies. Cinesite visual effects supervisor Simon Stanley-Clamp claimed that the most difficult part was doing the effects in 3D: "Rotoscoping is tricky. Cleaning up plates is double the work, and tracking has to be spot on." The lead companies, with over 300 effects each, were Industrial Light & Magic—responsible for, among others, the mermaids, ships in bottles and most water effects—and Moving Picture Company, who created digital ships and environment extensions, such as changing weather and designing cliffs and waterfalls. Filming the mermaids involved eight model-actresses, who portrayed them outside the water, as well as 22 synchronized swimming athletes and a group of stuntwomen, both of whom wore motion capture suits to be later replaced by digital mermaids. Mermaid corpses were depicted by plaster models. The design tried to avoid the traditional representations of mermaids in paintings and literature, instead going for a scaly body with a translucent membrane inspired by both jellyfish and the fabric employed in ballet tutus. To make the mermaids more menacing underwater, the faces of the actresses had some digital touch-ups on the underwater scenes, adding sharper teeth and a shimmery fish scale quality on the skin. ILM also handled Blackbeard's death, where Ian McShane's actual performance was covered by digital doubles which turned him into a "boiling mass of blood and clothing", and a hurricane-like formation that represented "the waters of the Fountain taking his life". Cinesite handled the recreation of London and Barbossa's peg leg, CIS Hollywood did 3D corrections and minor shots, and Method Studios created matte paintings.

== Music ==
The film's score was written by Hans Zimmer, who had worked in all of the previous entries in the franchise; being the main composer for the second and third installments. Zimmer said that he tried to incorporate a rock n' roll sound, as he felt "pirates were the rock 'n' rollers of many, many years ago", and Spanish elements, which led to a collaboration with Mexican guitarists Rodrigo y Gabriela and a tango song written by Penélope Cruz's brother Eduardo. American composer Eric Whitacre contributed several choir-based cues, as well as regular assistant Geoff Zanelli.

== Marketing ==
Disney's marketing president, MT Carney, said that the film's advertising campaign was intended "to remind people of why they fell in love with Jack Sparrow in the first place and also introduce new elements in a way that was elegant". Sony Pictures' former marketing president, Valerie Van Galder, was hired as a consultant. In the 2010 San Diego Comic-Con, footage of Johnny Depp as Captain Jack Sparrow was shown as a "Comic-Con Greeting" while also telling fans what to "possibly" expect in the upcoming film. The footage would later be uploaded on Jerry Bruckheimer Films's YouTube channel, as well as being featured in later features and the UK trailer for the film. The first behind-the-scenes footage from the film appeared on Entertainment Tonight on December 4, 2010. Three trailers were released, one in December, which had a 3D version included with the release of Tron: Legacy and broadcast by ESPN 3D; a Super Bowl XLV spot in February 2011, which was later released online in an extended version; and a final trailer in March that focused more on the plot than the previous trailer and commercials.

Promotional tie-ins included Lego Pirates of the Caribbean toy sets and a related video game, a cell phone app by Verizon Wireless, a special edition of Pirate's Booty, lines of nail polish by OPI, clothing from Hot Topic, and jewelry from Swarovski. Goldline International produced replicas of the "Pieces of Eight" coins from the movies and gold Mexican Escudo coins, which were given in sweepstakes at the El Capitan Theatre. At Disney California Adventure Park, the Pirates of the Caribbean segment of the World of Color show was extended to include visual clips and music from On Stranger Tides.

== Release ==
=== Theatrical ===
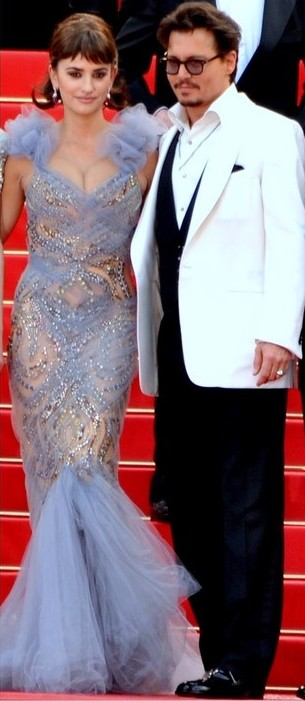
Penélope Cruz and Johnny Depp promoting the film at the 2011 Cannes Film Festival

On January 6, 2010, Disney announced that Pirates of the Caribbean: On Stranger Tides would be released in the United States and Canada on May 20, 2011, following Columbia Pictures' announcement of a delay in the Spider-Man reboot and Paramount Pictures slating Thor for May 6, 2011.

On May 5, as part of the last Harpo Hookup in The Oprah Winfrey Show, the studio audience enjoyed a surprise visit from Johnny Depp, followed by an advanced special screening of the film.

The world premiere of On Stranger Tides was on May 7, 2011, at a premium ticket screening at Disneyland in Anaheim, California, home of the original Pirates of the Caribbean ride that inspired the film series. Many of the film's stars were in attendance. Two other early screenings followed, one in Moscow on May 11, and another during the Cannes International Film Festival on May 14. The international release dates fell within May 18 and 20, with opening dates in the United Kingdom on May 18, in Australia on May 19, and in North America on May 20. The film was released on a then-record 402 IMAX screens, 257 screens in North America, and 139 in other territories. The total number of theaters was 4,155 in North America and 18,210 worldwide. For the film's release in the United States, On Stranger Tides received a PG-13 rating by the Motion Picture Association of America for "intense sequences of action/adventure violence, some frightening images, sensuality and innuendo"; marking it the first Walt Disney Pictures film to be rated PG-13 for sexual content.

=== Home media ===
The film was distributed by Walt Disney Studios Home Entertainment on DVD and Blu-ray on September 12, 2011, in the UK, topping both the Blu-ray and DVD sales charts during its first two weeks. The film had its high-definition home release on October 18, 2011, in the United States and Canada. Three different physical packages were made available: a 2-disc combo pack (Blu-ray and DVD), a 5-disc combo pack (2-disc Blu-ray, 1-disc Blu-ray 3D, 1-disc DVD, and 1-disc Digital Copy), and a 15-disc collection featuring all four Pirates movies. On Stranger Tides was also released as a movie download in both high definition and 3D. The regular DVD edition was released on December 6.

In its first week of release, it sold 1.71 million Blu-ray units and generated $48.50 million, topping the weekly Blu-ray chart. However, these results were quite skewed due to the one-month delay of its DVD-only release. It sold 3.20 million Blu-ray units ($83.46 million) after 11 weeks. It has also sold 1.12 million DVD units ($19.32 million). Upon its television premiere on December 29, 2013, in the UK on BBC One, it was watched by a total of 5.4 million viewers, making it the third-most watched program that night, according to overnight figures.

== Reception ==
=== Box office ===
On Stranger Tides earned $241.1 million in North America and $804.6 million in other countries for a worldwide total of $1.045 billion. It is the third-highest-grossing film of 2011 and the second most successful installment of the Pirates of the Caribbean series. On its worldwide opening weekend, it grossed $350.6 million, surpassing At World's End's $344 million opening as best in the series and ranking as the seventh-highest worldwide opening. It scored an IMAX worldwide opening-weekend record with $16.7 million (first surpassed by Transformers: Dark of the Moon).

It set records for the least time to reach $500, $600, and $700 million worldwide (in 10, 12 and 16 days, respectively). The first of these records was first surpassed by Dark of the Moon and the other two by Harry Potter and the Deathly Hallows – Part 2. After 46 days in theaters (July 2, 2011), it became the eighth film in cinema history and the fourth film released by Walt Disney Studios to cross the $1-billion-mark. It set a record for the fastest Disney-distributed film to reach the milestone (first surpassed by Marvel's The Avengers) and it is the fifth-fastest film overall to achieve this.

==== North America ====
During its Thursday-midnight showings, On Stranger Tides earned $4.7 million from 2,210 theaters, and $34.9 million in total on its opening day. It earned $90.2 million on its opening weekend, topping the weekend box office, but earning much less than its two immediate predecessors (At World's End – $114.7 million and Dead Man's Chest – $135.6 million) and the directly preceding Johnny Depp spectacle (Alice in Wonderland – $116.1 million). 3D showings accounted for only 46% of its opening-weekend gross. It closed on September 29, 2011, with a $241.1 million gross, ranking as the fifth-highest-grossing film of 2011 and the least profitable film of the franchise. However, it was the top-grossing movie during May 2011 (with $166.8 million by May 31).

==== Outside North America ====
Outside North America, On Stranger Tides is the sixth-highest-grossing film, the third-highest-grossing Disney film, the third-highest-grossing 2011 film and the highest-grossing film of the Pirates of the Caribbean series. It is the highest-grossing Pirates film in at least 58 territories.

During its opening day (Wednesday, May 18, 2011), On Stranger Tides made $18.5 million from 10 territories. It added 37 territories and $25.7 million on Thursday, for a two-day total of $44.2 million, and on Friday, it expanded to almost all countries, earning $46.2 million for a three-day total of $92.1 million. On its five-day opening weekend as a whole, it earned a then-record $260.4 million from 18,210 screens in more than 100 territories, in all which it reached first place at the box office. The record debut was surpassed later in the same summer season by Deathly Hallows Part 2. Earnings originating from 3-D showings accounted for 66% of the weekend gross, which was a much greater share than in North America. Its highest-grossing countries during its first weekend were Russia and the CIS ($31.42 million including previews), China ($22.3 million) and Germany ($20.53 million). It dominated for three weekends at the overseas box office despite competition from The Hangover Part II, Kung Fu Panda 2, and X-Men: First Class. It reached the $300, $400 and $500-million-mark at the box office outside North America in record time (7, 11 and 14 days respectively), records first surpassed by Deathly Hallows – Part 2.

On Stranger Tides set opening day records in both Russia (including the CIS) and Sweden. Subsequently, it set opening-weekend records in Latin America, the Middle East, Russia, Norway, Ukraine and Turkey, still retaining the record in Russia ($26.8 million) and Ukraine ($2.15 million). Its highest-grossing market after North America is Japan ($108.9 million), followed by China ($71.8 million) and Russia and the CIS ($63.7 million). It is the highest-grossing film of 2011 in Russia and the CIS, Austria, Ukraine, Greece, Portugal and Angola, South Africa, Romania, Bulgaria, Egypt, Estonia, and Latvia.

=== Critical response ===
On the review aggregator website Rotten Tomatoes, 32% of 275 critics' reviews are positive, with an average rating of 5/10. The website's consensus reads: "It's shorter and leaner than the previous sequel, but this Pirates runs aground on a disjointed plot and a non-stop barrage of noisy action sequences." Metacritic, which uses a weighted average, assigned the film a score of 45 out of 100, based on 39 critics, indicating "mixed or average" reviews. CinemaScore polls reported that the average grade moviegoers gave the film was a "B+" on an A+ to F scale.

Roger Ebert gave On Stranger Tides two out of four stars, saying that although the removal of Knightley and Bloom as well as the addition of Cruz were positive aspects, the film in general was "too much of a muchness" for him. Tom Long of The Detroit News gave a D+, saying that Jack Sparrow had "worn out his welcome". Despite the more linear plot, "the movie is still ridiculous". He found On Stranger Tides to be "precisely what you'd expect of the fourth installment of a movie based on an amusement park ride: a whole lot of noise, plenty of stunts and complete silliness." British film critic Mark Kermode gave the film an overwhelmingly negative review on his BBC Radio 5 Live show, saying "it's not as staggeringly misjudged as the third part, because it is just nothing, it is just a big empty nothing, whereas part three I think was an active atrocity, it's just nothing at all".

As with the previous films, the plot was criticized as incoherent and confusing. The Arizona Republic critic Bill Goodykoontz rated the film two out of five, stating that "the movie is a series of distractions tossed together in the hopes that they will come together in a coherent story. That never really happens." Online reviewer James Berardinelli considered the script "little more than a clothesline from which to dangle all of the obligatory set pieces", and USA Today's Claudia Puig found On Stranger Tides "familiar and predictable...often incoherent and crammed with pointless details."

Mike Scott from The Times-Picayune mentions that "while this latest chapter isn't quite sharp enough to restore the sense of discovery that made that first outing so darn exciting, it's enough to make up for most of the missteps that made the third one so darn arrgh-inducing." Writing for The A.V. Club, Tasha Robinson described On Stranger Tides as "a smaller film than past installments, by design and necessity", and felt that "the series has needed this streamlining" as the film "feels lightweight, but that's still better than bloated."

On Stranger Tides also had positive reviews; some critics found the film to be entertaining and well-made. Richard Roeper gave the film a B+, describing it as "the most fun installment since the first", calling the story "pure cartoon, but a lot easier to follow than the other sequels", and summing as "the franchise is getting tired, but Penelope energizes it." Along the same lines, Ann Hornaday of The Washington Post gave the film three out of four stars, writing that it "feels as fresh and bracingly exhilarating as the day Jack Sparrow first swashed his buckle, infusing new reckless energy into a franchise that shows no signs of furling its sails". She said that Marshall "swiftly and without fuss delivers the action set pieces and eye-popping escapism" and praised Depp, Cruz, and McShane's performances. Ray Bennett from The Hollywood Reporter considered that Marshall "shows terrific flair with all the usual chases and sword fights, and he handles the 3D well", and welcomed Penélope Cruz's character, saying she "brings her Oscar-winning vivacity" and had "lively sexual tension" with Depp. Writing for The Globe and Mail, Rick Groen found the action scenes to range from "merely competent to tritely cluttered", but he was pleased with the overall result, calling McShane a "fresh villain" whose "stentorian tones are welcome anywhere". Variety's Andrew Barker considered the film derivative, but accessible. "It has nary an original idea and still doesn't make much sense, but it's lost all pretensions that it should". He praised Geoffrey Rush, stating that he "not only gets the funniest lines and reaction shots, but also starts to siphon away much of the roguish charm that used to be Depp's stock and trade."

=== Accolades ===
The film was nominated for four Teen Choice Awards: Sci-Fi/Fantasy Movie, Sci-Fi/Fantasy Actor, Sci-Fi/Fantasy Actress, and Villain. Its trailer and TV spot were nominated for Golden Trailer Awards. The film won Best Movie for Mature Audiences Award at the 2012 Movieguide Awards.

== Sequel ==
Shortly before the release of On Stranger Tides in 2011, the cast and crew of the fourth film were told to set aside time in the near future, because Walt Disney Pictures intended to shoot a fifth and sixth film back-to-back with Johnny Depp as Captain Jack Sparrow. However, it was later stated that only a fifth film was in the works, with Terry Rossio writing the initial script without his partner Ted Elliott, and Rob Marshall rumoured to return to direct. Rossio's draft was a proposed story written with the studio and producer guideline that Keira Knightley and Orlando Bloom would not return to the series as Will Turner and Elizabeth Swann. Pintel and Ragetti also would not return from the Gore Verbinski's Pirates trilogy, among other characters, and there were also some connective tissue references to On Stranger Tides, notably Philip Swift and Syrena. However, Rossio's script was discarded in 2012, and the writer stated that a major reason was its use of a female villain, a sea witch named the Sea Widow, which made Johnny Depp "worried that would be redundant to Dark Shadows, which also featured a female villain."

In 2013, Jeff Nathanson was hired to write a new script for the film, featuring the Trident of Poseidon loosely based on Rossio's Trident of Neptune, which would be directed by Kon-Tiki directors Joachim Rønning and Espen Sandberg. The film would be titled Pirates of the Caribbean: Dead Men Tell No Tales, a stand-alone sequel which had Depp, Rush, McNally, Graham reprising their roles from On Stranger Tides, among other characters from the series, with Bloom and Knightley appearing in cameo roles. It was released in May 2017.
