= Ted Elliott =

Ted Elliott may refer to:

- Ted Elliott (American football) (born 1964), American football player
- Ted Elliott (footballer) (1919–1984), English soccer player
- Ted Elliott (screenwriter) (born 1961), American screenwriter
- Ted Elliott (umpire) (1851–1885), Australian cricketer and umpire

== See also ==
- Edward Elliott (disambiguation)
