= Edward Eliot =

Edward Eliot may refer to:

- Edward Eliot (born 1618) (1618–1710), English politician
- Edward Eliot (died 1722), Member of Parliament for St Germans 1705–1715, Lostwithiel 1718–1720 and Liskeard 1722
- Edward Craggs-Eliot, 1st Baron Eliot (1727–1804), British politician
- Edward James Eliot (1758–1797), British politician, son of Craggs-Eliot
- Edward John Eliot (1782–1863), British soldier
- Edward Eliot, 3rd Earl of St Germans (1798–1877), British politician, grandson of Craggs-Eliot
- Edward Eliot (priest) (1864–1943), Anglican archdeacon
- Edward Carlyon Eliot (1879–1940), British diplomat and Colonial Service administrator

== See also ==
- Edward Elliot (disambiguation)
- Edward Elliott (disambiguation)
