= Edward Eliot (died 1722) =

English politician (died 1722)

Edward Eliot (c. 1684 – 18 September 1722) was an English politician.

He sat as MP for St. Germans from 4 December 1705 till 1715, Lostwithiel from 26 November 1718 till 11 June 1720, and Liskeard from 12 April till 18 September 1722.

He was the first son of William Elliot and Anne, the daughter of Lawrence Williams. He was the brother of Richard Eliot. He was educated at Exeter College, Oxford and graduated 9 March 1703. He married his first wife Susan, the daughter of Sir William Coryton, 3rd Baronet and they had 1 son and 1 daughter. Susan was buried on 4 January 1714 and Eliot married Elizabeth, the daughter of James Craggs in April 1718.
