= Edward Elliott =

Edward Elliott may refer to:

- Edward Bishop Elliott (1793–1875), English clergyman and premillenarian writer
- Edward C. Elliott (1874–1960), American educational researcher and administrator
- Charlie Elliott (jockey) (Edward Charles Elliott, 1904–1979), British Champion flat racing jockey
- Edward E. Elliott (c. early to mid 20th century), U.S. legislator from California
- Edward Elliott (songwriter) (1800–1867), English writer of popular humorous songs
- Ted Elliott (umpire) (Edward Hudspeth Elliott, 1851–1885), Victorian (Australia) cricketer and umpire

== See also ==
- Edward Eliot (disambiguation)
- Ted Elliott (disambiguation)
