= Ted Elliott (screenwriter) =

American screenwriter and film producer

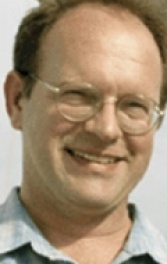
- Elliott in 2011
- Born: July 4, 1961 (age 65); Santa Ana, California, U.S.
- Occupations: Screenwriter; film producer
- Years active: 1989–present

Ted Elliott (born July 4, 1961) is an American screenwriter and film producer. Along with his writing partner Terry Rossio, Elliott has co-written the films Aladdin (1992), The Mask of Zorro (1998), Shrek (2001), and the first four Pirates of the Caribbean films (2003–11).

He was attached to write a feature version of Monkey Island, which failed to materialize. In 2004, he was elected to the board of directors of the Writers Guild of America; his term on the board ended in 2006. In 2005, Elliott ran for president of the Writers Guild of America West, but lost to animation writer and historical figurine maker Patric Verrone. Verrone received 1301 votes; Elliott received 591.

== Filmography (partial listing) ==
| Year | Film | Writer | Producer | Directed by | Notes |
|---|---|---|---|---|---|
| 1989 | Little Monsters | Yes | No | Richard Alan Greenberg | |
| 1992 | Aladdin | Yes | No | Ron Clements; John Musker | Nominated- Hugo Award for Best Dramatic Presentation |
| 1994 | The Puppet Masters | Yes | No | Stuart Orme | |
| 1998 | The Mask of Zorro | Yes | No | Martin Campbell | |
| 1998 | Godzilla | Story | No | Roland Emmerich | |
| 1998 | Small Soldiers | Yes | No | Joe Dante | |
| 2000 | The Road to El Dorado | Yes | No | Don Paul; Bibo Bergeron | |
| 2001 | Shrek | Yes | Co-Producer | Andrew Adamson; Vicky Jenson | BAFTA Award for Best Adapted Screenplay; Annie Award for Writing in a Feature Production; Nominated- Academy Award for Best Adapted Screenplay; Nominated- Nebula Award nomination for Best Script |
| 2002 | Treasure Planet | Story | No | Ron Clements; John Musker | |
| 2003 | Pirates of the Caribbean: The Curse of the Black Pearl | Yes | No | Gore Verbinski | Nominated- Bram Stoker Award for Best Screenplay; Nominated- Hugo Award for Best Dramatic Presentation |
| 2004 | National Treasure | uncredited | No | Jon Turteltaub | |
| 2005 | The Legend of Zorro | Story | No | Martin Campbell | |
| 2005 | Instant Karma | No | Yes | | |
| 2006 | Pirates of the Caribbean: Dead Man's Chest | Yes | No | Gore Verbinski | |
| 2007 | Pirates of the Caribbean: At World's End | Yes | No | Gore Verbinski | |
| 2007 | National Treasure: Book of Secrets | Story | No | Jon Turteltaub | |
| 2009 | G-Force | uncredited | Associate | Hoyt Yeatman | |
| 2011 | Pirates of the Caribbean: On Stranger Tides | Yes | Executive | Rob Marshall | |
| 2011 | Pirates of the Caribbean: Tales of the Code – Wedlocked | Yes | No | James Ward Byrkit | Short film; Filmed in 2006 |
| 2013 | The Lone Ranger | Yes | Executive | Gore Verbinski | Nominated- Golden Raspberry Award for Worst Screenplay |
| 2019 | Aladdin | No | No | Guy Ritchie | "Based on" credit (with Ron Clements, John Musker and Terry Rossio) |

=== Other credits ===
| Year | Film | Role |
|---|---|---|
| 1998 | Antz | Creative consultant/advisor |
| 2003 | Sinbad: Legend of the Seven Seas | Creative consultant/advisor |
| 2004 | Shrek 2 | Creative consultant |
| 2015 | Jake and the Never Land Pirates | Episode #89 – Captain Frost; Co-wrote storyboards with Terry Rossio |
