= Dick Cook =

American film entertainment executive

Richard W. Cook is an American film entertainment executive, and has served on the Board of Directors of Legendary Pictures since 2011. Prior to joining Legendary Pictures, he was the Chairman of the Walt Disney Studios from 2002 to 2009. At the time of his separation from the company, he was the only remaining top Disney executive who had worked for the company since before Michael Eisner took charge in 1984. Cook holds a degree in political science from the University of Southern California (USC).

== Career ==
Cook began his career with Disney in 1970 as a monorail and steam locomotive amusement park ride operator at Disneyland and moved to the Walt Disney Studios in Burbank in 1977 to manage pay television and non-theatrical releases. In 1980, he moved to the company's film distribution department, eventually heading both its distribution and marketing efforts. He earned a reputation there by his marketing of Disney's home video collection and hosting media-worthy movie premieres, for example securing a United States Navy aircraft carrier based in Pearl Harbor to host the debut of the film Pearl Harbor. In 1994, Cook was promoted to president of Buena Vista Pictures Distribution.

Cook was appointed in 1996 chairman of Walt Disney Motion Pictures Group, tasked with domestic and international theatrical marketing and distribution, feature film acquisition, and worldwide home video. In February 2002, Eisner named him as Peter Schneider's replacement as chairman of studios, popularly called the studio chief. Cook, described by BusinessWeek in 2003 as "the nicest guy in Disney's jungle", is known for his down-to-earth personality and his good relations with Disney's partners, including Jerry Bruckheimer. In 2005, Cook negotiated the exit of Harvey and Bob Weinstein from Disney's Miramax unit.

In 2005, Cook was awarded the Walt Disney Man of the Year Award, in recognition of "inspiring and positive role models for young people" from within the entertainment community, by Big Brothers Big Sisters of Greater Los Angeles & the Inland Empire. On July 17, 2006, Cook fired Disney executive Nina Jacobson over the telephone, immediately after the birth of her third child, while she was still in the delivery room.

On September 18, 2009, Cook stepped down as chairman of Walt Disney Studios, allegedly having been asked to do so by Bob Iger, president/CEO of the Walt Disney Company. He was then replaced by Disney Channel president Rich Ross.

In April 2011, Cook joined the Board of Directors of Legendary Pictures, and served as one of the executive producers of Legendary Pictures' Jackie Robinson biographical film 42. In August 2013, Cook was made Chairman of KCETLink's Board of Directors.

On April 19, 2015, Cook announced the formation of Dick Cook Studios, with an expected investment of $150 million by Citic Guoan Group Co. Ltd., a Chinese state-owned company and the largest subsidiary of conglomerate Citic Group. As of March 2016, the deal had closed, but no funding had yet been received under the arrangement. On the weekend of March 19, 2016, Cook Studios signed a production financing deal with Film Carnival, a Zhejiang, China-based company, for $500 million, covering 100% of movie costs. The announcement was made on March 29, after the Cook Studio and Film Carnival hosted the inaugural China–U.S. Motion Picture Summit on March 25 in Grand Epoch City, China. The first film using the financing is expected to be "Ranger's Apprentice" from director Paul Haggis, and the second, The Alchemyst. Both are to be filmed at Docklands Studios Melbourne, where its Asia-Pacific base would be set up under Melbourne-native managing director Kate McLean. The Australian and Victoria region governments granted incentives up to $20.5 million (AUS$30 million).
