= Roenberg =

Norwegian filmmaking duo

Roenberg was a partnership between Norwegian film directors Joachim Rønning and Espen Sandberg. They are best known for directing Kon-Tiki (2012), which was nominated for the Academy Award for Best Foreign Language Film.

== Early life and career ==
In the 1980s, Espen Sandberg and his childhood friend Joachim Rønning spent their free time making short films with Rønning's father's 30-pound home video camera.

In 1992 the duo attended Stockholm Film School in Sweden, and graduated in 1994. In 1995 they founded their own company. They called it "Roenberg", a portmanteau of their last names. Sandberg and Rønning established themselves in the American market with their spots for Capital One, Labatt's and especially with their USA Today Super Bowl 2001 Viewer's Poll-winning spot Rex for Budweiser. Together with fellow Norwegian director, Harald Zwart, they own and run Motion Blur, a production house for commercials. Founded in 2002 it is now one of the largest and most award-winning productions companies in Scandinavia.

=== 2006–2017 ===
In 2006, the duo directed the French-produced comedy western Bandidas in Mexico starring Salma Hayek and Penélope Cruz, it tells the tale of two very different women who become a bank robbing duo in an effort to combat a ruthless enforcer terrorising their town. In Norway, Rønning and Sandberg best known for directing the 2008 blockbuster movie Max Manus: Man of War with Aksel Hennie in the leading role, the story follows Manus (Aksel Hennie) from the Winter War against the Soviet Union, through the outbreak of World War II and the occupation of Norway by Nazi Germany until peacetime in 1945. In the same year they won Lions at Cannes for their Hydro Commercials Train Loop.

In 2012, Sandberg and Rønning were concerned with a new big movie about Thor Heyerdahl and the Kon-Tiki expedition. The development of this new film was shown in an exhibition at the Kon-Tiki Museum in Oslo. The film was released in 2012 with great reviews, Rotten Tomatoes reported that 83% of the critics gave a positive review. The site's consensus is: "A well-crafted retelling of an epic true story, Kon Tiki is a throwback to old-school adventure filmmaking that's exciting and entertaining in spite of its by-the-book plotting" and went on to be nominated for Best Foreign Language Film at the 85th Academy Awards and 70th Golden Globe Awards, and was also nominated for several other high-profile awards such as Satellite Awards and Norwegian Amanda Award

In 2013, it was announced that the duo were expected to direct the fifth installment of Pirates of the Caribbean which was released in 2017 titled Pirates of the Caribbean: Dead Men Tell No Tales.

== Filmography ==
Year	Title	Role	Notes
1997	Dag 1		Short film
2006	Bandidas	Director	
2008	Max Manus: Man of War	Director	Nominated- Amanda Award for Best Direction (shared with Joachim Rønning)
2012	Kon-Tiki	Director	(Award and Nominations shared with Joachim Rønning); Palm Springs International Film Festival for Directors to watch Nominated- Academy Award for Best Foreign Language Film; Nominated- Amanda Award for Best Direction; Nominated- Golden Globe Award for Best Foreign Language Film; Nominated- Satellite Award for Best Foreign Language Film
2012	Seile sin egen sjø		Documentary
2014	Marco Polo	Director	TV series
2017	Pirates of the Caribbean: Dead Men Tell No Tales	Director	
