= Pirates of the Caribbean: Secrets of the Lamp =

Upcoming Hungarian fan film

- Promotional poster
- Directed by: Ádám Slemmer
- Written by: Ádám Slemmer
- Based on: Pirates of the Caribbean by: Ted Elliott; Terry Rossio
- Produced by: Ádám Slemmer
- Starring: Ádám Slemmer; Alexandra Juhasz; Vazul Magyar; Áron Benesovits; András Ádám Bori
- Cinematography: Marton Bognar
- Music by: Ádám Helesfai
- Production company: Slemmerfilms Studio
- Running time: 150 minutes
- Languages: Hungarian; English
- Budget: $82470.15 (approx)

Pirates of the Caribbean: Secrets of the Lamp is an upcoming Hungarian swashbuckler fan film based on Pirates of the Caribbean starring Ádám Slemmer, Alexandra Juhasz and Vazul Magyar as Captain Jack Sparrow, Angelica Teach and new non-canon character Captain Robert Maynard respectively. The film is set after Pirates of the Caribbean: Dead Men Tell No Tales, with a new search commencing for a secret lantern.

Production started in 2022 and is projected to be completed in 2026, with plans to have a limited cinema and Comic Con release in 2027, alongside a standard free release on social media platforms. The fan film is also written, produced and directed by Slemmer, with music composed by Ádám Helesfai and cinematography from Marton Bognar.

== Plot ==
Set after the events of Pirates of the Caribbean: Dead Men Tell No Tales, the British Empire have expanded across the Caribbean, led by Captain Robert Maynard. They arrive in an Indian village whilst searching for something, raiding the village in the process. Captain Jack Sparrow and Angelica Teach begin to search for the item, a "secret lantern". An unknown awaits them however, and sacrifices may need to be made.

== Cast ==
- Ádám Slemmer as Captain Jack Sparrow
- Alexandra Juhasz as Angelica Teach
- Vazul Magyar as Captain Robert Maynard
- Áron Benesovits as Joshamee Gibbs
- András Ádám Bori as Scrum

== Development and production ==
Hungarian performer Ádám Slemmer began dressing up as Captain Jack Sparrow in 2015, performing professionally at events, such as parties. Having previously had an interest in filmmaking as a child, after putting together homemade costumes for several characters from the film series, Slemmer and his team produced a short film inspired by Pirates of the Caribbean whilst on vacation in Croatia. They decided to set up a larger fan production once they had acquired better equipment, prepared a script and invested money for filming in locations such as Mallorca. Slemmer set up Slemmerfilms Studios and a crowdfunding campaign, with donated money being split between production costs, perks for backers, shipping and Indiegogo fees. Due to the rights of Pirates of the Caribbean belonging to The Walt Disney Company, Secrets of the Lamp is unable to be commercialised.

Slemmer designed the costume for Sparrow using furniture upholstery, sewed with the help of his mother. The wig was designed with authentic accessories, including pearls and coins. Plasticine was sourced for the belt buckle. Whilst wearing the costume at a Hallowe'en party, Slemmer met Pirates of the Caribbean costume designer Penny Rose, who requested Slemmer's telephone number to set up a meeting with Johnny Depp. Depp, who was currently filming in Budapest for Modì, Three Days on the Wing of Madness, met with Slemmer on the set, both in costume as Jack Sparrow. They improvised together in character as Sparrow. Depp expressed his liking for the coat Slemmer designed for his version of the costume, and sent Slemmer a signed photo of them together in the mail after their meeting. Depp also requested for a copy of the finished production of Secrets of the Lamp for his own screening.

Pre-production began in 2022, with locations scouted, casting sessions taking place and screenwriting, costume and prop design commencing. Filming began in Mallorca and scene capture began in Croatia and Hungary. Set building for ship interiors and caves, with on-location filming in India starting in 2023. The first official trailer was released on 10 June 2023. More sets were built in 2024, with filming extending to Greece and Madeira. Shooting in Spain commenced in 2025, horseback specific stunts were captured and all exterior location photography was completed. The warehouse used for the sets became unavailable in 2025, meaning everything that had been built by the team was demolished. Slemmer published a message to fans requesting assistance in finding a new location for the sets. Siklós Castle was used as a filming location in 2025 for a two day shoot. Scenes filmed at the castle included horses and carriages, with stunts performed by Slemmer. Further scenes were filmed at Ráday Castle, with specific Indian temple scenes shot at Hungarian Castle in Pomáz, of which assembly took two and a half months, and involved carving nickel. Principal photography completed in 2026, with editing commencing. The second trailer was released on 25 March 2026.

== Promotion ==
A trailer for Secrets of the Lamp was shown at Comic Con, Budapest in 2023. Actors from the film appeared at GeekCon in 2023. A film panel also appeared at PlayIT Show in November 2025. The fan film was also promoted on YouTube by Joshamee Gibbs actor Kevin McNally at the Vienna Comic Con.
