= Pirates of the Caribbean: Dead Men Tell No Tales =

2017 film by Joachim Rønning and Espen Sandberg

- Theatrical release poster
- Directed by: Joachim Rønning; Espen Sandberg
- Screenplay by: Jeff Nathanson
- Story by: Jeff Nathanson; Terry Rossio
- Based on: Characters by; Ted Elliott; Terry Rossio; Stuart Beattie; Jay Wolpert; Walt Disney's Pirates of the Caribbean
- Produced by: Jerry Bruckheimer
- Starring: Johnny Depp; Javier Bardem; Brenton Thwaites; Kaya Scodelario; Kevin McNally; Geoffrey Rush
- Cinematography: Paul Cameron
- Edited by: Roger Barton; Leigh Folsom Boyd
- Music by: Geoff Zanelli
- Production companies: Walt Disney Pictures; Jerry Bruckheimer Films
- Distributed by: Walt Disney Studios; Motion Pictures
- Release dates: May 11, 2017 (Shanghai Disney Resort); May 26, 2017 (United States)
- Running time: 129 minutes
- Country: United States
- Language: English
- Budget: $230–320 million
- Box office: $795.9 million

Pirates of the Caribbean: Dead Men Tell No Tales (released in some territories as Pirates of the Caribbean: Salazar's Revenge) is a 2017 American swashbuckler film directed by Joachim Rønning and Espen Sandberg, and written by Jeff Nathanson. It is the fifth installment in the Pirates of the Caribbean film series, following On Stranger Tides (2011), and features an ensemble cast including Johnny Depp, Javier Bardem, Geoffrey Rush, Brenton Thwaites, Kaya Scodelario, and Kevin McNally. The film follows a search for the Trident of Poseidon by a down-on-his-luck Captain Jack Sparrow pursued by Captain Armando Salazar and a crew of deadly ghosts who have escaped from the Devil's Triangle, determined to kill every pirate at sea and take revenge on Sparrow.

Development of the film started shortly before the previous film was released in May 2011, with Terry Rossio writing the initial script, and Depp being involved in the writing process. In early 2013, Nathanson was hired to write a new script, while Rønning and Sandberg became involved in the project shortly afterward. The filmmakers cited the series' first installment, The Curse of the Black Pearl (2003), as inspiration for the script and tone of the film. Initially planned for a 2015 release, the film was delayed to 2016 and then to 2017, due to script and budget issues. Principal photography started in Queensland, Australia in February 2015, after the Australian government offered Disney $20 million in tax incentives, and ended that July. With an estimated production budget of $230–320 million, it is among the most expensive films ever made.

Dead Men Tell No Tales premiered at the Shanghai Disney Resort on May 11, 2017, and was released in the United States on May 26. The film received generally negative reviews from critics and grossed $796 million.

== Plot ==
13 years after Will Turner first leaves Elizabeth Swann aboard the Flying Dutchman, Will is visited by his twelve-year-old son, Henry. (Note: As depicted in Pirates of the Caribbean: At World's End (2007), Will Turner leaves Elizabeth Swann, only able to step on land once every ten years. In the film's "Ten Years Later" post-credit scene, Henry was nine years old. At the beginning Dead Men Tell No Tales, Henry is twelve. Because of this, thirteen years have passed in between films.) Will is still bound to the Dutchman, but Henry says that he can be freed from his curse by the Trident of Poseidon. Although his father tells him to accept his fate, Henry intends to recruit pirate Captain Jack Sparrow to help find the Trident.

Nine years later, Henry is a sailor aboard a British Navy ship, which sails into the supernatural Devil's Triangle, where the sailors come across the ghost ship Silent Mary and are slaughtered by ghosts led by the Spanish Navy pirate hunter, Captain Armando Salazar. Salazar leaves Henry as the sole survivor so that he can deliver a message of revenge to Jack. Jack, as a young pirate, (Note: A flashback sequence, as reminisced upon by Armando Salazar, features a pirate ship with the name "Wicked Wench" on the stern, although it was never made clear whether or not the pirate ship was an older version of the Black Pearl or if the two ships were one and the same vessel.) had tricked Salazar into entering the Triangle, causing his death but also inadvertently cursing his ship and crew as the undead.

On Saint Martin, young astronomer Carina Smyth is sentenced to death for witchcraft but escapes and crosses paths with Jack, who has been suffering from a spell of bad luck since his last adventure, (Note: As depicted in Pirates of the Caribbean: On Stranger Tides (2011)) as his pirate crew botches a bank robbery. Jack later trades his compass for a drink, an act that destroys the Devil's Triangle and frees Salazar's ghostly crew to seek revenge. Carina learns Henry is looking for the Trident's location and offers to help him using her unknown father's diary. Upon their arrests, Carina and Jack stall the execution process, but they escape with the help of Henry and Jack's crew. They all set sail on the Dying Gull, where Carina deciphers the clues in her diary, discovering that the stars will lead to an island where the Trident is hidden.

Meanwhile, Captain Hector Barbossa is informed that Salazar has attacked three pirate ships of Barbossa's fleet. Shansa, a sea witch, tells Barbossa that the Trident could lead him to a "treasure" and gives him Jack's compass. Barbossa makes a deal with Salazar by offering to help find Jack. Salazar pursues the Dying Gull, forcing Jack, Henry, and Carina to flee to an island, discovering that Salazar's crew cannot go on land. Barbossa allies himself with Jack, releasing the miniaturized Black Pearl that was trapped in a bottle by Blackbeard, and taking command of it once more as they continue their journey to the Trident's island. During the voyage, Jack and Barbossa realize Carina is Barbossa’s long-lost daughter.

The Silent Mary destroys a British Navy warship and battles the Pearl until it runs aground on the Trident's island. Jack, Barbossa, and Carina use the island's magic to part the ocean, which opens a path to the Trident on the ocean floor. Salazar captures Henry and possesses him to walk on the ocean floor and seize the Trident. Once he does so, Henry is given his body back, and Jack distracts Salazar, allowing Henry to destroy the Trident, breaking all curses upon the sea and restoring Salazar's crew to life. However, the Trident's destruction causes the divided sea to close in on them. The Pearl lowers its anchor to lift the group to safety, but Salazar pursues them.

Carina realizes that Barbossa is her father when she spots a tattoo of the Trident's star formation, identical to the diary's cover, on his arm. Barbossa sacrifices himself to kill Salazar, allowing the others to escape. Shortly afterwards, Carina names herself "Barbossa" before Henry and Carina go to Port Royal, Jamaica. Henry and Carina kiss before Henry reunites with Will, now free from the Dutchman, on land. Will then embraces and kisses Elizabeth immediately afterwards. After watching the reunion from aboard the Pearl, Jack, now its captain once again, adopts Barbossa's monkey "Jack" before sailing away into the horizon.

In a post-credits scene, Will and Elizabeth are asleep in a bedroom when the shadow of Davy Jones enters. When the figure moves closer with his claw, Will wakes up to see nobody in the room. Assuming it was a nightmare, Will turns toward his wife and goes back to sleep, unaware of the barnacles lying on the floor next to the bed. (Note: While the post-credits scene teased a potential plot involving Davy Jones, who appears in some form while Will and Elizabeth sleep, directors Joachim Ronning and Espen Sandberg also hinted that it could be the "beginning of the end" or "just a dream or nightmare".)

== Cast ==
- Johnny Depp as Captain Jack Sparrow:
  A down-on-his-luck pirate and captain of the Black Pearl, which is now trapped in a bottle, who travels with Henry and Carina in search of the Trident of Poseidon to defeat an old nemesis, Captain Salazar. Rønning wanted to focus on relatable characters, as in the first film, "where Jack is not the [lead ... but] comes in and crashes the party every now and then," and to make use of Depp's "comedic genius". The film examines Jack's backstory, with the young Jack portrayed by Anthony De La Torre, whose face was replaced by a CGI replica of Depp as he looked in 21 Jump Street and What's Eating Gilbert Grape (1993). Rønning felt de-aging Depp was tricky against the canon of the franchise.
- Javier Bardem as Captain Armando Salazar:
  Once the greatest pirate hunter who ever roamed the seas as Captain of the Silent Mary for the Spanish Navy, an old nemesis of Jack Sparrow, now a cursed ghost commanding a crew of undead soldiers who escape from the Devil's Triangle, seeking revenge on Jack Sparrow and determined to kill every pirate at sea. "He's a little supernatural. He's on a real mission of vengeance for something Jack did to him when he was 18. He's a pretty nasty character." Bardem set out to imbue the character with "a rage based on dented pride," owing to his spectacular fall, from a high-ranking commander of a Spanish fleet to being betrayed and trapped in hell by Jack. With Salazar's body language, he tried to convey a bull in an arena, "full of rage and need of vengeance, but also wounded." It took three hours a day to apply the make-up, which Bardem referred to as having "cold chicken breasts" glued to his face.
- Geoffrey Rush as Captain Hector Barbossa:
  Sparrow's rival, the former Captain of the Black Pearl, and the Captain of the Queen Anne's Revenge. On the character's role of having settled into a growing and prosperous pirate empire, Rush said, "Barbossa has become extremely wealthy. He's got more money than he can deal with and he's not a guy of high taste. He's running a very big empire, maybe 10 or 12 ships, so he's the kingpin."
- Brenton Thwaites as Henry Turner:
  The son of Will Turner and Elizabeth Swann who vows to break his father's curse by searching for the Trident. The directors were keen to draft a new protagonist relationship with Henry and Carina, stating that "in the middle of a big action scene, you need to be able to lean on the characters and find the heart of that story, and channel the characters' vulnerability." Rønning noted that identity is a major theme in the film, and to Henry and Carina's story arc: "they are on a similar quest and find common ground in looking for who they are." Bruckheimer also said the film recaptured the spirit of the first film after they previewed the picture, as well as how Will's son [Thwaites] and the "search for his father" was the backbone of the story. Lewis McGowan is credited as 12-Year-Old Henry.
- Kaya Scodelario as Carina Smyth:
  A headstrong, altruistic astronomer who was wrongly accused of being a witch. Scodelario explained the character's motivation and role, saying, "she is an academic, she's fighting for the right to study at university because women couldn't at that time." For the directors, it was important to "modernise it with Henry and Carina, Kaya, especially brought that with her. She's a modern woman." Scodelario worked with scriptwriter Jeff Nathanson to ensure the character was unique to the series and not a copy of Elizabeth Swann. She said that female characters often "fall into two camps; they are either pretty and perfectly put together or completely insane. Carina has definitely got a little bit of both."
- Kevin McNally as Joshamee Gibbs: Captain Jack's loyal friend and first mate.

Supporting characters appearing in the film include: David Wenham as Lieutenant John Scarfield, a Royal Navy officer who commands HMS Essex; and Golshifteh Farahani as Shansa, a sea witch who helps Barbossa and Scarfield. Stephen Graham, Martin Klebba, Giles New, and Angus Barnett reprise their roles as Scrum, Marty, and Murtogg and Mullroy, respectively, from previous films, as the members of the pirate crews of Jack Sparrow and Hector Barbossa. Adam Brown, Danny Kirrane, and Delroy Atkinson appear as members of Sparrow's crew. In the prison scene, Paul McCartney briefly appears as Uncle Jack, Jack Sparrow's uncle and namesake, though the character was named after McCartney's own uncle, John "Jack" McCartney. Jacob Elordi appeared as an extra in the film, reportedly as one of Saint Martin's redcoats. Hannah Walters, Stephen Graham's wife, portrayed a Captain's Daughter Tavern wench in On Stranger Tides, and had the larger role of Pierre "Pig" Kelly's sister, Beatrice.

Orlando Bloom reprises his role as Will Turner, a blacksmith-turned-pirate who became the Captain of the Flying Dutchman at the end of At World's End (2007). Bloom wore barnacle prosthetics for the role, reflecting Turner's status as the cursed Captain of the Dutchman. Keira Knightley briefly appears at the end in a non-speaking role as Elizabeth Swann, Will's wife and Henry's mother, following the "demand" that the character be added after test screenings. A CGI silhouette of Davy Jones is seen in the post-credits scene, but actor Bill Nighy stated that he had not been informed about the character's appearance.

== Production ==
=== Development ===
Shortly before the release of On Stranger Tides, the cast and crew of the fourth film were told to set aside time in the near future, because Walt Disney Pictures intended to shoot a fifth and sixth film back-to-back. However, it was later stated that only a fifth film was in the works, with Terry Rossio writing a script for a fifth film without his partner Ted Elliott. Rob Marshall was rumoured to return to direct, but declined after choosing to direct Into the Woods (2014). After Marshall passed on the film, many directors were rumored to take over. Gore Verbinski, who was responsible for the original three films, felt that "there's no reason other than financial" in making the film. The eventual shortlist included Fredrik Bond, Rupert Sanders, and the eventual choice, Norwegian film duo Joachim Rønning and Espen Sandberg. The studio chose them based on their Academy Award-nominated high-sea film Kon-Tiki, and their ability to work with a limited budget.

Rossio's script was discarded in 2012, and the writer stated that a major reason was its use of a female villain, which made actor Johnny Depp "worried that it would be redundant to Dark Shadows, which also featured a female villain." In January 2013, Disney hired Jeff Nathanson to work on a script. Nathanson's script featured the Trident of Poseidon, loosely based on the Trident of Neptune from Rossio's unproduced screenplay. Rønning and Sandberg said they were particularly moved by Nathanson's "funny and touching" script, which convinced them to sign to direct in May, Rønning believing that the script was "all there" but needed scenes to "carry the tradition of Gore Verbinski, bring the emotional core and big action set pieces." In August, Rønning and Sandberg revealed that the title would be Dead Men Tell No Tales, and that it would be both a stand-alone adventure and tie into the overall mythology of the series. In the following month, producer Jerry Bruckheimer said, "We have an outline everyone loves but the script is not done," explaining that the release would be postponed beyond summer 2015. The studio questioned Depp's bankability following the financial losses of The Lone Ranger (2013), and the screenplay's first drafts were not approved by Walt Disney Studios chairman Alan Horn, who was concerned about the finished product. Bruckheimer revealed that script and budget issues were behind the delay, and that Nathanson was at work on a second draft, based on a well-received outline, saying they needed a script and budget everyone would approve. Depp was also invited to collaborate on the script, with the actor believing it would be the last of the franchise and wanting to end it right. After the script was accepted, the film was officially green-lit by Disney in July 2014, with a planned release on July 7, 2017.

The directors were inspired by the first film, The Curse of the Black Pearl, stating that the original is thrilling but above all a comedy with heart, and wanted to reinvent the "structure and the dynamics between the characters." In addition to recapturing the best of previous franchise installments, the directors had the works of Charlie Chaplin and Buster Keaton in mind when crafting the tone of the film. The pair wanted the film to be the "most emotional" of the series, and to explore the roots of Jack Sparrow. They decided to use Jack's compass as the "key to unlock Salazar from his hellish prison in the Triangle," and toned down some of the fantastic elements "to ground it, even in Pirates Of The Caribbean [sic]." Geoffrey Rush argued that the pair brought "Euro sensibility to traditional Hollywood franchise thinking," while Orlando Bloom believed that they had "recaptured the simplicity and charm" of the original film. Bruckheimer also said the film recaptured the spirit of the first film after they previewed the picture, as well as how Will Turner's son and the "search for his father" was the backbone of the story. Kaya Scodelario said that the producers wanted to take the franchise back to its origins, with a story that gave characters a conclusion while opening new possibilities. Along with the directors and writers, many of the crew members were new to the franchise, replacing those who had served on the previous four films, with the exception of Bruckheimer, costume designer Penny Rose, and executive producer Chad Oman.

=== Casting ===
Speaking at the On Stranger Tides press launch in Cannes, Depp said he would play the role so long as it is popular with the public. By August 2012, news surfaced that Depp had signed for the fifth film, earning A$90 million to reprise his role. One month later, Penélope Cruz stated that in spite of her enjoying playing Angelica in On Stranger Tides, she had not been contacted regarding a fifth film. Geoffrey Rush had commented on returning as Hector Barbossa in the fifth installment, saying "If they keep shapeshifting this character, absolutely," and implied that he might return as the villain. Other co-stars from the previous film include Sam Claflin as Philip Swift, Astrid Berges-Frisbey as Syrena and Greg Ellis as Theodore Groves, even though Groves appeared to have died in On Stranger Tides. In October 2012, Keith Richards expressed interest in reprising his role as Captain Teague, but was unavailable by the time the film went into production.

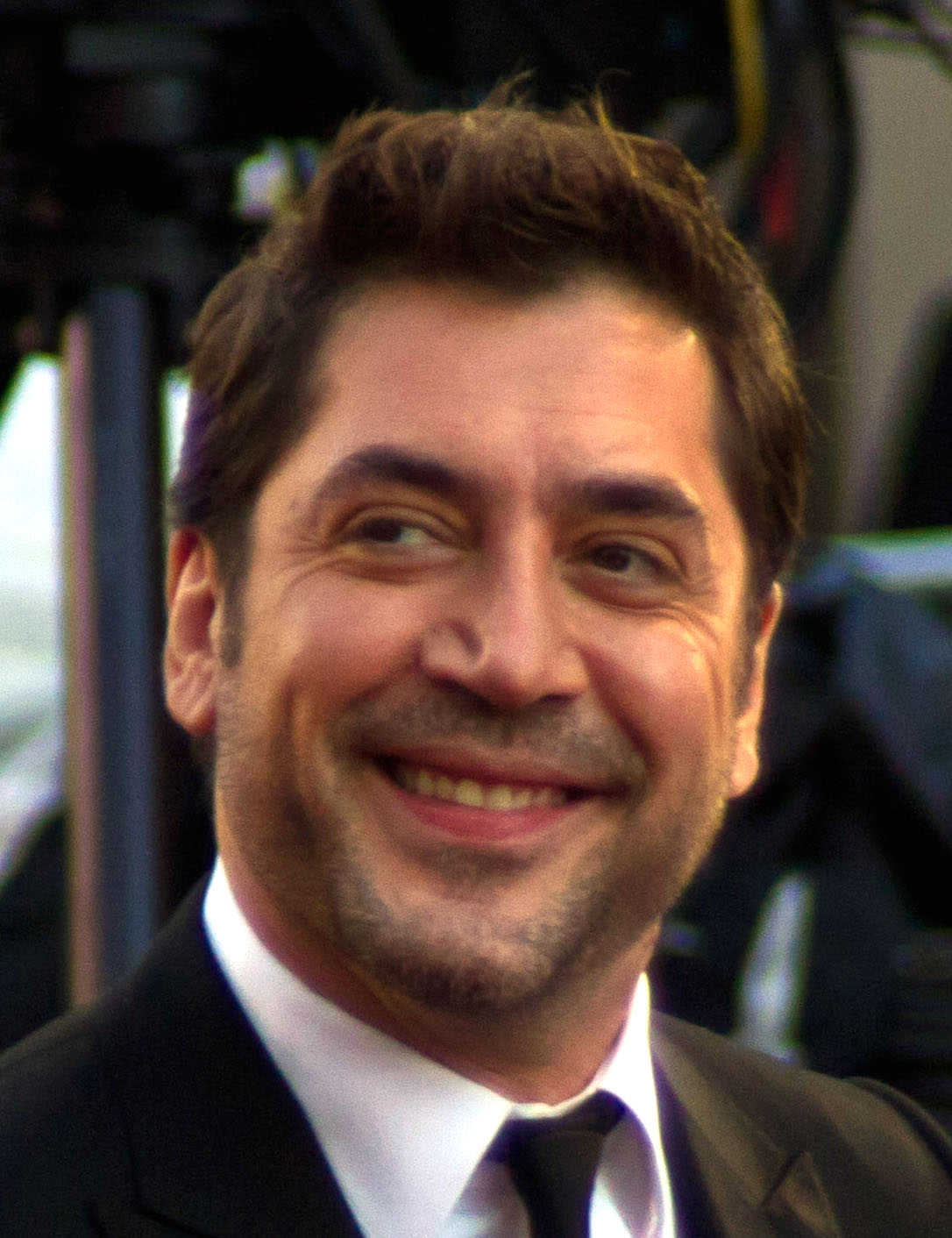
Javier Bardem was cast to play the role of Captain Salazar. His wife, Penélope Cruz, had starred in the previous instalment of the franchise as Angelica.

In 2013, according to the Australian Daily Telegraph, Samara Weaving was rumoured to be meeting with casting directors and had reportedly been shortlisted for a role in the film. Whether or not the role was for Carina Smyth or Olivia Cole, a character who only appeared in Jeff Nathanson's screenplay, is unconfirmed. In later interviews, Weaving said watching Pirates of the Caribbean in Malta at age 12 inspired her to get into acting.

By late 2013, it was reported that Christoph Waltz was in talks to appear as the film's main antagonist Captain Brand, a vengeful British ghost, and Disney was interested in Rebecca Hall as the female lead Carina Smyth, a woman in her late 30s who is an astronomer accused of being a witch. but he later declined. The villain was eventually portrayed by Cruz's husband, Javier Bardem. In 2014, Bardem signed on to portray the ghostly Armando Salazar of the Spanish Navy, who in Nathanson's early scripts was referred to as the ghostly Captain John Brand of the British Navy. Bardem had liked the working environment of the fourth movie, which he witnessed accompanying his wife, and stated he was also a fan of the franchise and of Depp's performance as Jack Sparrow. Australian actor Brenton Thwaites entered talks for the role of Henry in late November 2014, after Disney chose him over Taron Egerton, George MacKay, Mitchell Hope, Ansel Elgort, and Sam Keeley.

Kaya Scodelario was chosen as the female lead Carina Smyth out of a shortlist that included Gabriella Wilde, Alexandra Dowling, Jenna Thiam, and Lucy Boynton. Scodelario confirmed that she was playing "a totally different character" from Keira Knightley's Elizabeth Swann, and also that she will be Henry's love interest, given in earlier drafts she was envisioned as a love interest of Sparrow. Kevin McNally confirmed his return as Joshamee Gibbs in late January. Adam Brown, Delroy Atkinson, and Danny Kirrane were revealed as cast members shortly before filming. As filming begun, two actors from the previous films were confirmed to return, Martin Klebba as Marty and Stephen Graham as Scrum. Keith Richards previously expressed interest in reprising his role as Captain Teague, but due to Richards being unavailable, Depp invited Paul McCartney to appear as Uncle Jack, Jack Sparrow's uncle and namesake, though the character was named after McCartney's own uncle, John "Jack" McCartney.

Orlando Bloom and Keira Knightley stated in 2007 they did not want to return as Will Turner and Elizabeth Swann, noting the closure of their characters in At World's End, and have been repeatedly quoted in saying they wanted to move on from the Pirates franchise by 2010. While Knightley affirmed this over the years, Bloom made statements about returning as early as October 2011. In 2012, Moviehole.Net reported that a "separate Disney contact" gave this one-line response: "Will Turner's story might not be finished..." By 2014, Bloom commented that while he was not sure whether he would return as Will Turner, there were talks and indicated that Disney could make a soft reboot with the franchise and focus on Will and his son. Both Will Turner's return and Bloom's participation was kept secret until the Disney D23 in 2015, after filming had wrapped. Despite having previously stated that she would not return, there were reports suggesting that Keira Knightley would reprise her role as Elizabeth Swann due to the return of Will and the focus on their grown-up son Henry in the film. Once the film was shown to test audiences, the filmmakers felt they were "demanded" to reunite both Will and Elizabeth's character. To ensure that Knightley could reprise this role, the production moved for a one-day shoot in London, where she was working.

Other actors had expressed interest in reprising their roles from the previous films, such as Tia Dalma portrayer Naomie Harris. Both Lee Arenberg and Mackenzie Crook commented on the possibility of returning as Pintel and Ragetti. In an interview on November 7, 2014, Crook confirmed that he had received a call of availability from Disney for the film, though he later declined in order to focus on his television series Detectorists. He said he had felt "pangs of nostalgia" when the cast and crew filmed without him. Arenberg, who also had a television commitment, to Once Upon a Time, added that he felt like the producers "weren't really trying to court us like they really wanted us."

=== Filming ===
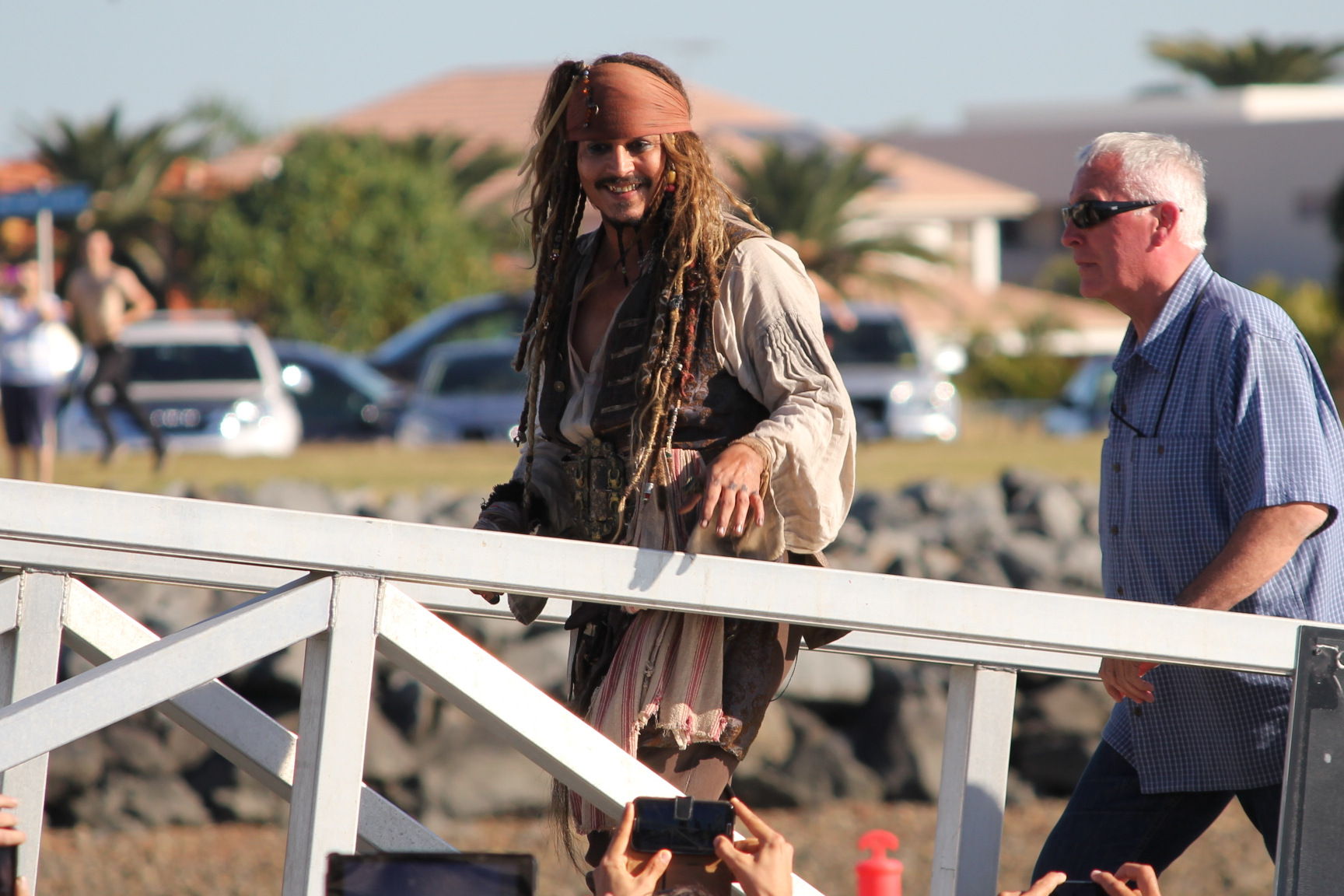
Depp on set in Queensland in June 2015

Directors Joachim Rønning and Espen Sandberg originally stated that shooting would take place in Puerto Rico and New Orleans, and Bruckheimer had previously mentioned that there might be a sequence in Louisiana. However, a spokesman for Australian Arts Minister George Brandis confirmed that the fifth installment was set to shoot exclusively in Australia after the government agreed to repurpose $20 million of tax incentives, originally intended for the remake of 20,000 Leagues Under the Sea; thus edging out Mexico and South Africa as filming locations. Filming took place exclusively in Queensland, Australia, as the largest production to ever shoot in the country. Village Roadshow Studios and the Whitsunday Islands were officially confirmed as filming locations. On January 1, 2015, The Rainbow Gypsy, a 35-year-old replica of an 1897 Scottish trawler, underwent an extensive refit at the Gold Coast, including a new bowsprit, and reconfigured decks and cabins, for filming as the Dying Gull. Its captain and owner, Kit Woodward, was a rigger in the film.

Filming commenced on February 17, 2015. Ship scenes were filmed in front of a giant outdoor greenscreen in Helensvale, while a film set in the form of a village was built in Maudsland. Because the greenscreens' height blocked the sunlight, containers with inflatable bluescreens mounted on top were added to the set to allow some light to enter. While the first script that Paul Cameron read for the film involved "five to six main ships" until a rewrite more than doubled the fleet, and Bruckheimer promised 13 ships facing off in "the biggest battles yet," the end product had eleven vessels; to cut costs, most of these were partial constructs later enhanced by computer graphics, with some built atop a hydraulic rig to mimic the movement of seafaring while on land. The camera crew, led by the director of photography Paul Cameron, also made extensive use of drones, to capture immersive views at sea without resorting to helicopters or cranes.

Filming moved to Doug Jennings Park on the Spit from March 30 to June 15 for water-bound scenes. However, due to extreme sea sickness among the cast and crew from the "big swells," filming moved to Raby Bay for calmer waters. Scenes were shot at Byron Bay on June 1. Locals made up more than 75 percent of the 850-plus crew then working on the film. After much speculation about whether Orlando Bloom would return, Bloom arrived at the Gold Coast in late May to reprise his role as Will Turner. Scenes featuring a skeleton of a sperm whale that had been constructed were shot at Hastings Point from June 21 to 23.

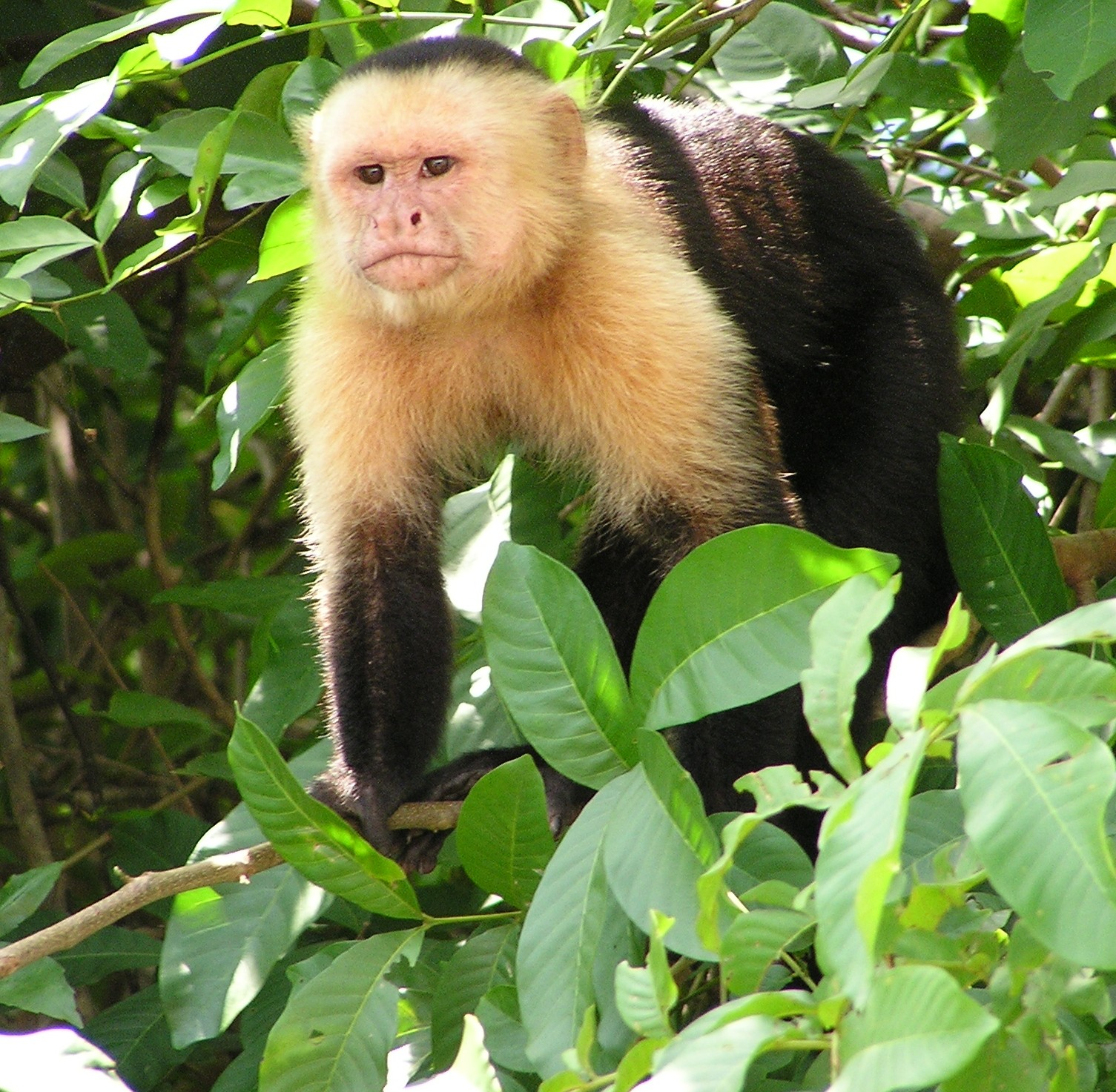
Several problems occurred during production in regards to the usage of capuchin monkeys for the film, including violating Australian biosecurity laws, the safety of the monkeys and of the crew.

A number of issues and controversies set back the film during its production. The biosecurity laws in Australia posed problems regarding the capuchin monkeys that portray Hector Barbossa's pet monkey Jack, because the animals are regarded as a category 1 pest and call for strict requirements and a 30-day quarantine. Further controversy erupted from animal rights activist groups, who urged Federal Environment Minister Greg Hunt to reject the entry application, arguing that the long air-flight would affect their health, and that their performance was unnatural and would create demand for illegal wildlife trade. The three activist groups were Humane Society International Australia, WildFutures, and the Captive Animals Protection Society (Freedom for Animals/FFA). One of the monkeys caused further disruption when it wandered off set at Movie World, and bit the ear of a make-up artist on another production set for Mako Mermaids.

Crew and cast members were forced to cover the camera lenses on all mobile phones with duct tape to prevent leaks before its release. To prevent fans from interfering with the production, secret filming locations used the production name of "Herschel" to hide the fact it was the fifth Pirates of the Caribbean film. Following the attempt of an armed man trying to bypass security, the already tight security was increased.

On March 10, 2015, Depp was injured off set and had to be flown to the United States for surgery. Due to his absence, filming stalled completely and 200 crew members were forced to stand down for two weeks, after finishing all they could do without Depp. Depp returned to set on April 21. In June, Kaya Scodelario was injured on set along with a stuntman. In early July, dismantling of the sets at the Spit had begun. Most of the cast and crew had finished on July 8, and a wrap party was held on July 11. Filming then moved to the Whitsundays for the final shots. On July 21, 2015, Rønning announced that filming had wrapped after a 95-day shoot. After nearly a year in post-production, reshoots and additional photography were conducted in Vancouver, Canada from March 24 to April 13, 2016, under the production title "Herschel Additional Photography".

=== Post-production ===
Editing was a collaboration between Roger Barton and Leigh Folsom Boyd, with the latter detailing that "Roger started from the beginning of the film and I started from the end, and we kind of met in the middle." Boyd added that it was the longest post-production process she was ever involved with, as Disney wanted to give "the support and leeway we needed to tell the story and allow for the complex visual effects to bake." The editors worked closely with the previsualization team to, according to effects supervisor Gary Brozenich, "give meat to the bones of the plates that needed effects explanation as well as any new CG beats that would be added later." Along with the post-production team in Los Angeles, Brozenich had to split his time going to the UK and Montreal, to check on the eight companies handling the film's 2,000 visual effects shots, with 150 of them consisting only of computer graphics. The primary vendor was Brozenich's own employer Moving Picture Company (MPC). Among MPC's work were Salazar's undead pirates, whose on-set footage was mostly replaced by CGI to achieve missing body parts and floating hair and clothing. Brozenich stated that what was kept of the original actors was "their run, gait and faces." To provide reference for the floating parts, which were meant to resemble a perpetual drowning state, a stuntman in full costume and wig was filmed underwater in a swimming pool performing various actions.

Atomic Fiction handled the scenes at St. Martin, turning the few blocks of buildings built on set into more than 600 CG buildings, surrounded by a jungle environment. The work combined references from both the Caribbean and Thailand, and enhanced through CGI both the guillotine on which Jack Sparrow is nearly executed and the bank from the heist scene; the bank was meant to look as if its foundations were dug through the ground instead of sliding on the surface. Along with sea footage filmed in both the Australian sets and Key West, Florida, there was extensive usage of water simulations, with the artists using the Beaufort scale to ensure the waves and wind realistically matched.

== Music ==
This was the first film in the series (since the first) that Hans Zimmer did not compose the music for. Instead, the main composer is one of his protégés, Geoff Zanelli, who had worked on the previous four installments in the franchise. Zanelli said that Zimmer "redefined the sound of the entire genre" and considered it a great accomplishment to have worked with him and Bruckheimer. He used this experience with the franchise to build a new sound for the film. He stated that "you don't have to modernize the melodies, those are timeless," citing one example of how he tried to make the sound more modern by featuring an electric cello to create a menacing leitmotif for Captain Armando Salazar. This was also the first Pirates of the Caribbean score to feature mostly live percussion, as opposed to the programmed percussion in the prior scores. As it took more than a year for the film to start production following Zanelli being hired, he accompanied the script's evolution, and was familiar with the character arcs that he would need to translate in their theme songs. Zanelli always started writing the music on the piano, namely a synthesized orchestra. The film's soundtrack was released on May 26, 2017.

== Marketing ==
A robust marketing effort helped promote Dead Men Tell No Tales. The film was first showcased at the Disney D23 Expo 2015, where Depp appeared in costume as Jack Sparrow and the film's logo was revealed, with Orlando Bloom confirmed to be starring in the film. A 240-page tie-in prequel novel expanding the backstory of the character Carina Smyth was also released, titled Pirates of the Caribbean: Dead Men Tell No Tales – The Brightest Star in the North: The Adventures of Carina Smyth. The film was showcased at the 2016 Walt Disney Content Showcase in South Africa, where concept art, story details and on-set images were previewed. On April 26, 2017, Depp made a cameo appearance at Disneyland's Pirates of the Caribbean ride in an event to promote the film, surprising unsuspecting guests by portraying Jack Sparrow in place of one of the animatronics.

== Release ==
=== Theatrical ===
Dead Men Tell No Tales screened on March 28, 2017 at the 2017 CinemaCon event in Las Vegas. It had its world premiere at the Shanghai Disney Resort in Shanghai on May 11, 2017, and was released in the United States on May 26. In some countries, including the United Kingdom, the film was released as Pirates of the Caribbean: Salazar's Revenge, a decision that the directors were not informed about. It is the first Hollywood feature to be released in the United States for the new panorama-like ScreenX format, which played in two locations in the United States, the CGV Buena Park and the CGV Cinemas in Los Angeles. Additionally, it played in 81 screens at select theaters in Korea, China, Thailand, Vietnam, Turkey, and Indonesia. The film also played in 4D on 373 4DX screens worldwide. The film was released in IMAX in an expanded 1.9:1 aspect ratio.

=== Home media ===
Pirates of the Caribbean: Dead Men Tell No Tales was released on digital download by Walt Disney Studios Home Entertainment on September 19, 2017, and on Blu-ray, Ultra HD Blu-ray, and DVD on October 3. It was the top home-media release in its first week, with the Blu-ray version accounting for 78% of sales, and brought the previous four films back into the 25 best-sold Blu-rays.

=== Terry Rossio's screenplay ===
Following the film's theatrical release in 2017, Terry Rossio released his unproduced screenplay on his website Wordplay. Also titled Dead Men Tell No Tales, this was a proposed story written with the studio and producer guideline that Keira Knightley and Orlando Bloom would not return to the series, and so those characters would not be available. Rossio's draft also included additional information in extensive footnotes. Among other characters, Pintel and Ragetti return from the trilogy, the missionary Philip Swift and mermaid Syrena from On Stranger Tides, with Dead Men Tell No Tales also introducing a female villain, a sea witch named the Sea Widow. The story is Jack Sparrow's race with the Sea Widow to recover the Siren Song from the Mermaid Trove and featured the Trident of Neptune, which contains the three Pearls of Neptune that each have a different power: Rhysis, which commands the winds; Tyrah, pearl of the tides; and Miro, which commands the creatures of the sea. It would also be revealed that Rhysis was hidden twice over inside a sapphire in the hilt of the Sword of Triton, only identified as Blackbeard's or Barbossa's sword in Rossio's script, with the power being revealed to control the wind, as well as a ship's rigging, and would not be used to release the Black Pearl from the bottle.

Rossio's script was discarded in 2012, and the writer stated that a major reason was its use of a female villain, the Sea Widow, which made Johnny Depp "worried that would be redundant to Dark Shadows, which also featured a female villain." As a result, in January 2013, Disney hired Jeff Nathanson to work on a script in the development of the film, which featured the Trident of Poseidon, an artifact that holds all the power of the sea, mainly used in the final version of the story to break every curse and by Will Turner's son Henry to free his father from the Flying Dutchman.

== Reception ==
=== Box office ===
With an estimated production budget of $230–320 million, Pirates of the Caribbean: Dead Men Tell No Tales grossed $172.6 million in the United States and Canada, and $623.4 million in other territories, for a worldwide total of $795.9 million. It had a worldwide opening of $271.4 million from 55 markets, with $24 million coming from 1,088 IMAX screens. The film's six-day opening gross pushed the franchise gross past the $4 billion mark. Despite being the lowest-grossing film of the series in North America by nearly $70 million and despite scoring the second-lowest nominal gross of the franchise outside North America (only ahead of Curse of the Black Pearl), Dead Men Tell No Tales became the highest-grossing entry of the Pirates franchise outside North America when accounting for foreign-exchange rates, surpassing On Stranger Tides, which grossed $593.4 million at July 2017 rates. The largest-earning foreign markets were China ($172.3 million), Japan ($59.5 million), and Russia and the CIS ($40.7 million), where it was the second-highest-grossing film behind Avatar (2009). Deadline Hollywood noted the film would turn a net profit of around $280 million after factoring together all expenses and revenues based on a projected $850 million final gross (though it would ultimately fall short of that figure, likely resulting in a smaller profit).

==== United States and Canada ====
Dead Men Tell No Tales debuted over the four-day Memorial Day opening weekend, being released in 4,276 theaters, of which over 3,100 were 3D, taking advantage of formats such as IMAX, D-Box, and 4DX. The film earned $23.4 million on its first day, including $5.5 million from previews. It was the lowest opening day of the franchise. Dead Men Tell No Tales grossed $63 million over three days, and $78.5 million over four (Friday–Monday), finishing first at the box office, ahead of Guardians of the Galaxy Vol. 2 (2017) and fellow newcomer Baywatch (2017). It was the second-smallest opening weekend of the franchise, only earning more than the first film, with each of the other installments earning at least $90 million. Despite the film registering the highest test score in the series, the opening came in well below expectations of $80–115 million. Analysts attributed the underperformance to negative reviews, franchise fatigue, and Johnny Depp's diminishing returns and depreciating public image, amid his personal problems. Still, it performed better than Disney's previous Memorial Day releases (Prince of Persia: The Sands of Time (2010), Tomorrowland (2015), and Alice Through the Looking Glass (2016)), and studio executives said they were pleased with the movie's opening, which helped Disney push past $1 billion in the US.

The film fell by a total of 65% in its second weekend, the worst of the series, grossing $22.1 million, and finishing in third place, after newcomers Wonder Woman (2017) ($103.3 million) and Captain Underpants: The First Epic Movie (2017) ($23.9 million). It remained in the top ten for four more weeks.

==== Other territories ====
Marketed as Salazar's Revenge in some countries, including United Kingdom, Ireland, France, Spain, Italy, Israel, Sri Lanka, Australia and New Zealand, the film was released day-and-date with its debut in 54 markets (91% of its total marketplace, except Japan, where it debuted on July 1). Preliminary reports had the film opening to $150–175 million, but possibly overperforming depending on major markets, most notably China. While its Chinese run benefited from the May 28–30 Dragon Boat Festival—a lucrative moviegoing period—and from International Children's Day (June 1), the Manchester Arena bombing had a deteriorating effect on certain European markets over the film's opening weekend. From Wednesday to Friday, it registered an opening of $208.8 million. Around $14 million of that came from IMAX screenings, the second-biggest international IMAX opening in May, after Captain America: Civil War (2016). Similar to its US plunge, it earned $73.8 million in its second weekend, falling to second place, behind Wonder Woman.

It recorded the biggest opening day of the year in several markets, including Germany ($3.6 million), Austria, France ($2.3 million), Finland, Sweden, Belgium, Thailand ($400,000), Indonesia, Malaysia, and the Netherlands ($900,000). Russia posted the biggest opening of all time with $18.4 million ($18.6 million including previews). In China, where the film had its global premiere, it earned $21.3 million on its opening day, the fourth-biggest Disney opening in the country. It had an 87% marketshare and had already surpassed the entire earnings of Pirates of the Caribbean: At World's End. Earning a total of $67.9 million, it registered the third-highest three-day for any Disney title, and a much-higher opening than the US. The film did extremely well in IMAX, earning $9 million from 401 screens from Friday to early Monday bookings. The robust opening has been attributed to the Dragon Boat Festival, Depp's star power, the ubiquity of the franchise, the impact of Shanghai Disneyland Park, and good word of mouth, with a score of 7.5/10 on reviews aggregator Douban and 8.7/10 on top mobile-ticketing platform Weying. The film's final release market was Japan (July 1), where it opened at number one, achieving the highest-grossing opening for a Western film of the year, earning $9.25 million over the July 1–2 weekend. It retained the box office lead for one more week, and was the highest-grossing foreign film in the following weekend.

=== Critical response ===
On the review aggregator website Rotten Tomatoes, 30% of 291 critics' reviews are positive, with an average rating of 4.7/10. The website's consensus reads: "Pirates of the Caribbean: Dead Men Tell No Tales proves that neither a change in directors nor an undead Javier Bardem is enough to drain this sinking franchise's murky bilge." Metacritic, which uses a weighted average, assigned the film a score of 39 out of 100, based on 45 critics, indicating "generally unfavorable" reviews. Audiences polled by CinemaScore gave the film an average grade of "A−" on an A+ to F scale, and PostTrak reported 81% of those gave the film a positive score.

Mike Ryan of Uproxx criticized what he termed as a convoluted plot and overabundance of characters, resulting in a film that was "practically incoherent." Writing for Rolling Stone, Peter Travers called the film "bloated, boring, repetitive, and draining" and gave it one star out of four. Ignatiy Vishnevetsky of The A.V. Club wrote that the film echoes the first three of the franchise, "in which Johnny Depp's louche and campy Jack Sparrow played second banana to an insipid love story... the two romantic leads ... succeed only in making the shortest movie in the series seem just as long as the rest." A. O. Scott of The New York Times said of the film, "Its pleasures are so meager, its delight in its own inventions so forced and false, that it becomes almost the perfect opposite of entertainment." Michael O'Sullivan of The Washington Post remarked that the film was "loud, overstimulating and hard to take in all in one sitting." Mick LaSalle of San Francisco Chronicle found the film to be "a jumble of half-baked impulses" that had been forced into a played-out franchise.

Richard Roeper of Chicago Sun-Times gave the film three stars out of four, saying: "Dead Men works well enough as a stand-alone, swashbuckling comedic spectacle, thanks to the terrific performances, some ingenious practical effects, impressive CGI and a steady diet of PG-13 dialogue peppered with not particularly sophisticated but (I have to admit) fairly funny sexual innuendo." Pete Hammond of Deadline Hollywood praised the film, calling it "the most entertaining installment," and giving credit to Rønning and Sandberg for creating a "rollicking good time". He praised the visual effects, particularly Salazar and his crew, arguing that the film should be in line to receive an Academy Award for Visual Effects. He also gave high praise to Bardem for being able to create such a "fully dimensional villain" under the layers of make-up and CGI, and Depp for keeping the film and franchise going. Leah Greenblatt of Entertainment Weekly gave the film a 'B', praising the fun nature of the film and its visuals and calling it "gorgeously detailed swashbuckling nonsense," but wished that the script had taken more risks instead of following the formula used in previous films. Ashley Esqueda of CNET gave the film a positive review, arguing that it brought the franchise back to what made its first two installments so fun, and praised Depp's performance as being "delightful as ever." Brian Truitt of USA Today gave the film three stars out of four, saying "What was once a past-its-prime franchise seems to have found new life."

=== Accolades ===
At the 38th Golden Raspberry Awards, Pirates of the Caribbean: Dead Men Tell No Tales received nominations for Worst Actor for Johnny Depp, Worst Supporting Actor for Javier Bardem, and Worst Screen Combo for Depp and "his worn out drunk routine". Gary Brozenich, Sheldon Stopsack, Patrick Ledda, Richard Clegg, and Richard Little of MPC was nominated for Outstanding Visual Effects – Feature Film at the 2017 Hollywood Post Alliance Awards. The film was nominated for Choice Movie: Action, Choice Movie Actor: Action, Choice Movie Actress: Action, Choice Movie: Villain, Choice Movie: Summer, and Choice Liplock at the 2017 Teen Choice Awards.

== Future ==
On March 4, 2017, directors Joachim Rønning and Espen Sandberg stated that Dead Men Tell No Tales was "only the beginning of the final adventure", indicating that it would not be the last film of the franchise and that a sixth film could be released. While the post-credits scene teased a potential plot involving Davy Jones, who appears in some form while Will and Elizabeth sleep, the directors also hinted that it could be the "beginning of the end" or "just a dream or nightmare". In September 2017, producer Jerry Bruckheimer indicated that another Pirates sequel would be possible if Dead Men Tell No Tales did well in its home release. In October 2017, the sixth film was confirmed and Kaya Scodelario said that she was contracted to return. Shortly after, it was reported that Rønning was being eyed to return to direct the sequel. By August 2018, the sixth film was still in development. The following month, Keira Knightley said she did not see herself returning for another installment because she is a mother now and that the films take too long to shoot.

In October 2018, it was reported that Disney had been looking for ways to make a sixth film in the franchise, bringing on Deadpool (2016) writers Rhett Reese and Paul Wernick to write a reboot though producer Jerry Bruckheimer was expected to return. However, in February 2019, Reese and Wernick departed the project and the project was cancelled. In October 2019, Disney announced that Craig Mazin and Ted Elliott would write the script for the sixth film. In May 2020, Bruckheimer commented that the first draft of the screenplay for the sixth film would soon be finished, although he was not sure if Depp should reprise his role in the film. However, in April 2022, in the midst of the trial between Johnny Depp and Amber Heard, Depp revealed that he had no intention of returning to the franchise, citing his strained relationship with Disney after they had removed him from the franchise before a verdict was reached in the case.

In February 2023, Orlando Bloom expressed interest in returning to the franchise as Will Turner in the sixth film. The next month, Knightley explained to Entertainment Tonight why she would not make a return to the franchise. "What about Elizabeth Swann?" Knightley joked when asked if she would rejoin the crew. "I mean, she sailed away so nicely. She sailed away in brilliant style." Bruckheimer has meanwhile reiterated he would like to have Depp involved in the sequel. In July 2023, it was reported that Depp had softened his stance and was willing to return to the franchise, "If it's the right project". The next month, Mazin stated that he'd pitched a Pirates script to Disney, but that he would only commit to it if he was able to work with Elliot; Mazin confirmed that his and Elliot's script was bought by Disney, also commenting that it was "too weird", but the 2023 Writers Guild of America strike had slowed production of the sixth installment.

In March 2024, Jerry Bruckheimer stated that the sixth film would be a reboot. Despite this, two months later, Bruckheimer hoped to see Johnny Depp return.

On May 20, 2024, Bruckheimer provided further clarification on the series's status. In an interview with Entertainment Weekly, he confirmed that there were two different Pirates movies in production. The first is a reboot that he intends to produce with scriptwriter Jeff Nathanson, and the second is the Margot Robbie film that will be penned by Christina Hodson. He stated that he hoped both films would be made, and noted that Disney was particularly receptive to the Robbie-led film. In regards to the reboot, he confirmed that it would not follow characters from the previous films, but stated that he hoped Depp would make an appearance.

In June 2025, Bruckheimer said the sixth film would feature returning cast members and new faces. When asked about his future in the franchise, Bloom said, "I think they're trying to work out what it would all look like, I personally think it'd be great to get the band back together. That would be great, but there are always different ideas, and so we'll see where it lands." Two months later, when discussing the possibility of Depp returning for the sixth film, Bruckheimer said, "If he likes the way the part's written, I think he would do it. It's all about what's on the page, as we all know."

In September 2026, Bloom was asked about a potential sixth film at the Toronto International Film Festival, and he said, "I don’t know. I think nostalgia is such a big thing in the world today. So we keep harking back to these things, because of the nostalgia and what the feeling you had watching whatever your favorite thing was. There’s that kind of thing that I think we’re seeing in movies as well. So we'll see."

A fan film, titled Pirates of the Caribbean: Secrets of the Lamp, written and directed by Ádám Slemmer, entered pre-production in 2022, and is set to release in 2027. The film takes place after Dead Men Tell No Tales, with the focus on a new "secret lantern".
