= Satellite Award for Best Foreign Language Film =

Annual film award

- Awarded for: Best Foreign Language Film
- Country: United States
- Presented by: International Press Academy
- First award: 1996
- Currently held by: The Secret Agent (2025)

The Satellite Award for Best Foreign Language Film is one of the annual Satellite Awards given by the International Press Academy.

== Winners and nominees ==
=== 1990s ===
| Year | Film | Original title | Director(s) | Country |
|---|---|---|---|---|
| 1996 | Breaking the Waves | | Lars Von Trier | Denmark / United Kingdom |
| 1996 | Azúcar Amarga | | Leon Ichaso | United States / Dominican Republic |
| 1996 | La cérémonie | | Claude Chabrol | France / Germany |
| 1996 | Kolya | Kolja | Jan Svěrák | Czech Republic |
| 1996 | Prisoner of the Mountains | Кавказский пленник | Sergei Bodrov | Russia / Kazakhstan |
| 1996 | Ridicule | | Patrice Leconte | France |
| 1997 | Shall We Dance? | Shall we ダンス? | Masayuki Suo | Japan |
| 1997 | Ponette | | Jacques Doillon | France |
| 1997 | Live Flesh | Carne trémula | Pedro Almodóvar | Spain / France |
| 1997 | Ma vie en rose | | Alain Berliner | France / Belgium / United Kingdom |
| 1997 | The Promise | La promesse | Jean-Pierre Dardenne and Luc Dardenne | Belgium / France |
| 1998 | Central Station | Central do Brasil | Walter Salles | Brazil / France |
| 1998 | The Celebration | Festen | Thomas Vinterberg | Denmark |
| 1998 | Life Is Beautiful | La vita è bella | Roberto Benigni | Italy |
| 1998 | Only Clouds Move the Stars | Bare skyer beveger stjernene | Torun Lian | Norway |
| 1998 | La Séparation | | Christian Vincent | France |
| 1999 | All About My Mother | Todo sobre mi madre | Pedro Almodóvar | Spain / France |
| 1999 | Three Seasons | Ba Mùa | Tony Bui | United States |
| 1999 | The Emperor and the Assassin | 荊軻刺秦王 | Chen Kaige | China |
| 1999 | The King of Masks | 變臉 | Wu Tianming | China |
| 1999 | The Red Violin | Le violon rouge | François Girard | Canada / Italy / United Kingdom |
| 1999 | Run Lola Run | Lola rennt | Tom Tykwer | Germany |

=== 2000s ===
| Year | Film | Original title | Director(s) | Country |
|---|---|---|---|---|
| 2000 | Crouching Tiger, Hidden Dragon | 臥虎藏龍 | Ang Lee | Taiwan / China / Hong Kong / United States |
| 2000 | Goya in Bordeaux | Goya en Burdeos | Carlos Saura | Spain |
| 2000 | His Wife's Diary | Дневник его жены | Alexei Uchitel | Russia |
| 2000 | Malèna | | Giuseppe Tornatore | Italy / United States |
| 2000 | Malli | | Santosh Sivan | India |
| 2000 | Shower | 洗澡 | Zhang Yang | China |
| 2001 | No Man's Land | Ničija zemlja | Danis Tanović | Bosnia and Herzegovina / France / Slovenia / Italy / United Kingdom / Belgium |
| 2001 | Amélie | Le fabuleux destin d'Amélie Poulain | Jean-Pierre Jeunet | France / Germany |
| 2001 | Beijing Bicycle | 十七歲的單車 | Wang Xiaoshuai | China / France / Taiwan |
| 2001 | Our Lady of the Assassins | La Virgen de los sicarios | Barbet Schroeder | Colombia / Spain / France |
| 2001 | The Princess and the Warrior | Der Krieger und die Kaiserin | Tom Tykwer | Germany |
| 2001 | Baran | باران | Majid Majidi | Iran |
| 2002 | Talk to Her | Hable con ella | Pedro Almodóvar | Spain |
| 2002 | All or Nothing | | Mike Leigh | United Kingdom |
| 2002 | Bloody Sunday | | Paul Greengrass | United Kingdom / Ireland |
| 2002 | Everyone Loves Alice | Alla älskar Alice | Richard Hobert | Sweden / Norway |
| 2002 | Monsoon Wedding | | Mira Nair | India / France / Germany / Italy / United States |
| 2002 | Rain | | Christine Jeffs | New Zealand |
| 2002 | Sex and Lucia | Lucía y el sexo | Julio Medem | Spain / France |
| 2003 | City of God | Cidade de Deus | Fernando Meirelles and Kátia Lund | Brazil |
| 2003 | The Barbarian Invasions | Les invasions barbares | Denys Arcand | Canada / France |
| 2003 | Gloomy Sunday | Ein Lied von Liebe und Tod / Szomorú vasárnap | Rolf Schübel | Germany / Hungary |
| 2003 | Monsieur Ibrahim | Monsieur Ibrahim et les fleurs du Coran | François Dupeyron | France |
| 2003 | Osama | اسامه | Siddiq Barmak | Afghanistan / Netherlands / Japan / Ireland / Iran |
| 2003 | Spring, Summer, Autumn, Winter... and Spring | 봄 여름 가을 겨울 그리고 봄 | Kim Ki-duk | South Korea / Germany |
| 2004 | The Sea Inside | Mar adentro | Alejandro Amenábar | Spain / France / Italy |
| 2004 | Don't Move | Non ti muovere | Sergio Castellitto | Italy |
| 2004 | House of Flying Daggers | 十面埋伏 | Zhang Yimou | China / Hong Kong |
| 2004 | The Motorcycle Diaries | Diarios de motocicleta | Walter Salles | Argentina / Brazil / United States / Chile / Peru / United Kingdom / Germany / France |
| 2004 | Bad Education | La mala educación | Pedro Almodóvar | Spain |
| 2004 | A Very Long Engagement | Un long dimanche de fiançailles | Jean-Pierre Jeunet | France |
| 2005 | Mother of Mine | Äideistä parhain / Den bästa av mödrar | Klaus Härö | Finland |
| 2005 | 2046 | | Wong Kar-wai | Hong Kong |
| 2005 | Innocent Voices | Voces inocentes | Luis Mandoki | Mexico / El Salvador |
| 2005 | Lila Says | Lila dit ça | Ziad Doueiri | France |
| 2005 | Turtles Can Fly | لاک پشت ها هم پرواز می کنند | Bahman Ghobadi | Iran / France / Iraq |
| 2005 | Walk on Water | ללכת על המים | Eytan Fox | Israel |
| 2006 | Volver | | Pedro Almodóvar | Spain |
| 2006 | Apocalypto | | Mel Gibson | United States |
| 2006 | Changing Times | Les temps qui changent | André Téchiné | France |
| 2006 | The Lives of Others | Das Leben der Anderen | Florian Henckel von Donnersmarck | Germany |
| 2006 | The Syrian Bride | הכלה הסורית | Eran Riklis | Israel / France / Germany |
| 2006 | Water | वाटर | Deepa Mehta | Canada / United States / India |
| 2007 | Lust, Caution | 色，戒 | Ang Lee | United States / China / Taiwan |
| 2007 | 4 Months, 3 Weeks and 2 Days | 4 luni, 3 săptămâni şi 2 zile | Cristian Mungiu | Romania |
| 2007 | La Vie en Rose | La môme | Olivier Dahan | Czech Republic / France / United Kingdom |
| 2007 | Offside | آفساید | Jafar Panahi | Iran |
| 2007 | The Orphanage | El orfanato | J. A. Bayona | Spain |
| 2007 | Ten Canoes | | Rolf de Heer and Peter Djigirr | Australia |
| 2008 | Gomorrah | Gomorra | Matteo Garrone | Italy |
| 2008 | Caramel | سكر بنات | Nadine Labaki | Lebanon |
| 2008 | The Class | Entre les murs | Laurent Cantet | France |
| 2008 | Let the Right One In | Låt den rätte komma in | Tomas Alfredson | Sweden |
| 2008 | Padre Nuestro | Sangre de mi sangre | Christopher Zalla | United States / Argentina |
| 2008 | Reprise | | Joachim Trier | Norway |
| 2009 | Broken Embraces | Los abrazos rotos | Pedro Almodóvar | Spain |
| 2009 | The Maid | La nana | Sebastián Silva | Chile |
| 2009 | I Killed My Mother | J'ai tué ma mère | Xavier Dolan | Canada |
| 2009 | Red Cliff | 赤壁 | John Woo | China / Hong Kong / Japan / South Korea / Taiwan / United States |
| 2009 | The White Ribbon | Das weiße Band, Eine deutsche Kindergeschichte | Michael Haneke | Austria / Germany / France / Italy |
| 2009 | Winter in Wartime | Oorlogswinter | Martin Koolhoven | Netherlands |

=== 2010s ===
| Year | Film | Original title | Director(s) | Country |
|---|---|---|---|---|
| 2010 | The Girl with the Dragon Tattoo | Män som hatar kvinnor | Niels Arden Oplev | Sweden / Denmark / Germany |
| 2010 | Biutiful | | Alejandro González Iñárritu | Mexico / Spain |
| 2010 | I Am Love | Io sono l'amore | Luca Guadagnino | Italy |
| 2010 | Mother | 마더 | Bong Joon-ho | South Korea |
| 2010 | Outside the Law | Hors-la-loi خارجون عن القانون | Rachid Bouchareb | France / Algeria / Tunisia / Belgium |
| 2010 | Soul Kitchen | | Fatih Akın | Germany |
| 2010 | White Material | | Claire Denis | France |
| 2011 | Mysteries of Lisbon | Mistérios de Lisboa | Raúl Ruiz | Portugal / France |
| 2011 | 13 Assassins | 十三人の刺客 | Takashi Miike | United Kingdom / Japan |
| 2011 | Faust | | Alexander Sokurov | Russia |
| 2011 | Las Acacias | | Pablo Giorgelli | Argentina |
| 2011 | The Kid with a Bike | Le Gamin au vélo | Jean-Pierre Dardenne and Luc Dardenne | Belgium / France |
| 2011 | Le Havre | | Aki Kaurismäki | Finland / France / Germany |
| 2011 | Miss Bala | | Gerardo Naranjo | Mexico |
| 2011 | Mozart's Sister | Nannerl, la sœur de Mozart | René Féret | France |
| 2011 | The Turin Horse | A torinói ló | Béla Tarr and Ágnes Hranitzky | Hungary |
| 2012 | The Intouchables | Intouchables | Olivier Nakache and Éric Toledano | France |
| 2012 | Pietà | 피에타 | Kim Ki-duk | South Korea |
| 2012 | Amour | | Michael Haneke | France / Austria / Germany |
| 2012 | Beyond the Hills | După dealuri | Cristian Mungiu | Romania |
| 2012 | Caesar Must Die | Cesare deve morire | Paolo and Vittorio Taviani | Italy |
| 2012 | Kon-Tiki | | Joachim Rønning and Espen Sandberg | Norway / Denmark / Germany / Sweden / United Kingdom |
| 2012 | Our Children | À perdre la raison | Joachim Lafosse | Belgium / France |
| 2012 | A Royal Affair | En kongelig affære | Nikolaj Arcel | Denmark / Sweden / Czech Republic |
| 2012 | A Separation | جدایی نادر از سیمین | Asghar Farhadi | Iran |
| 2012 | War Witch | Rebelle | Kim Nguyen | Canada |
| 2013 | The Broken Circle Breakdown | | Felix van Groeningen | Belgium |
| 2013 | Bethlehem | בית לחם | Yuval Adler | Israel |
| 2013 | Blue Is the Warmest Colour | La Vie d'Adèle – Chapitres 1 & 2 | Abdellatif Kechiche | France / Belgium / Spain |
| 2013 | Circles | Кругови | Srdan Golubović | Serbia |
| 2013 | Four Corners | | Ian Gabriel | South Africa |
| 2013 | The Great Beauty | La grande bellezza | Paolo Sorrentino | Italy / France |
| 2013 | The Hunt | Jagten | Thomas Vinterberg | Denmark |
| 2013 | Metro Manila | | Sean Ellis | United Kingdom |
| 2013 | The Past | Le Passé | Asghar Farhadi | France / Italy / Iran |
| 2013 | Wadjda | وجدة | Haifaa al-Mansour | Saudi Arabia |
| 2014 | Tangerines | Mandariinid / მანდარინები | Zaza Urushadze | Estonia / Georgia |
| 2014 | Gett: The Trial of Viviane Amsalem | Gett: Le procès de Viviane Amsalem | Ronit Elkabetz and Shlomi Elkabetz | Israel / Germany / France |
| 2014 | Ida | | Paweł Pawlikowski | Poland / Denmark / France / United Kingdom |
| 2014 | Force Majeure | Turist | Ruben Östlund | Sweden / France / Norway |
| 2014 | Leviathan | Левиафан | Andrey Zvyagintsev | Russia |
| 2014 | Little England | Μικρά Αγγλία | Pantelis Voulgaris | Greece |
| 2014 | Mommy | | Xavier Dolan | Canada |
| 2014 | Timbuktu | | Abderrahmane Sissako | Mauritania / France |
| 2014 | Two Days, One Night | Deux jours, une nuit | Jean-Pierre Dardenne and Luc Dardenne | Belgium / France / Italy |
| 2014 | Wild Tales | Relatos salvajes | Damián Szifron | Argentina / Spain |
| 2015 | Son of Saul | Saul Fia | László Nemes | Hungary |
| 2015 | The Assassin | 刺客聶隱娘 | Hou Hsiao-hsien | Taiwan / China / Hong Kong |
| 2015 | The Brand New Testament | Le Tout Nouveau Testament | Jaco Van Dormael | Belgium / France / Luxembourg |
| 2015 | Goodnight Mommy | Ich seh, Ich seh | Veronika Franz and Severin Fiala | Austria |
| 2015 | The High Sun | Zvizdan | Dalibor Matanić | Croatia / Serbia / Slovenia |
| 2015 | Labyrinth of Lies | Im Labyrinth des Schweigens | Giulio Ricciarelli | Germany |
| 2015 | Mustang | | Deniz Gamze Ergüven | France / Germany / Turkey |
| 2015 | A Pigeon Sat on a Branch Reflecting on Existence | En duva satt på en gren och funderade på tillvaron | Roy Andersson | Sweden / Norway / France / Germany / Denmark |
| 2015 | The Second Mother | Que Horas Ela Volta? | Anna Muylaert | Brazil |
| 2015 | The Throne | 사도 | Lee Joon-ik | South Korea |
| 2016 | The Salesman | فروشنده | Asghar Farhadi | Iran / France |
| 2016 | The Ardennes | D'Ardennen | Robin Pront | Belgium |
| 2016 | Elle | | Paul Verhoeven | France / Germany |
| 2016 | The Handmaiden | 아가씨 | Park Chan-wook | South Korea |
| 2016 | The Happiest Day in the Life of Olli Mäki | Hymyilevä mies | Juho Kuosmanen | Finland / Germany / Sweden |
| 2016 | Julieta | | Pedro Almodóvar | Spain |
| 2016 | A Man Called Ove | En man som heter Ove | Hannes Holm | Sweden |
| 2016 | Ma' Rosa | | Brillante Mendoza | Philippines |
| 2016 | Paradise | Рай | Andrei Konchalovsky | Russia |
| 2016 | Toni Erdmann | | Maren Ade | Germany / Austria |
| 2017 | In the Fade | | Fatih Akin | Germany / France |
| 2017 | BPM (Beats per Minute) | | Robin Campillo | France |
| 2017 | The Divine Order | | Petra Volpe | Switzerland |
| 2017 | First They Killed My Father | | Angelina Jolie | Cambodia / United States |
| 2017 | Foxtrot | | Samuel Maoz | Israel / Germany / France / Switzerland |
| 2017 | Loveless | | Andrey Zvyagintsev | Russia / France / Belgium / Germany |
| 2017 | The Square | | Ruben Östlund | Sweden / France / Germany / Denmark |
| 2017 | White Sun | | Deepak Rauniyar | Nepal / Netherlands / Qatar / United States |
| 2018 | Roma | | Alfonso Cuarón | Mexico / United States |
| 2018 | The Cakemaker | האופה מברלין | Ofir Raul Grazier | Israel / Germany |
| 2018 | Cold War | Zimna wojna | Paweł Pawlikowski | Poland / France / United Kingdom |
| 2018 | The Guilty | Den skyldige | Gustav Möller | Denmark |
| 2018 | I Am Not a Witch | | Rungano Nyoni | United Kingdom / France / Germany / Zambia |
| 2018 | Shoplifters | 万引き家族 | Hirokazu Kore-eda | Japan |
| 2019 | Truth and Justice | Tõde ja õigus | Tanel Toom | Estonia |
| 2019 | Atlantics | Atlantique | Mati Diop | France / Senegal / Belgium |
| 2019 | Beanpole | Дылда | Kantemir Balagov | Russia |
| 2019 | Les Misérables | | Ladj Ly | France |
| 2019 | Portrait of a Lady on Fire | Portrait de la jeune fille en feu | Céline Sciamma | France |
| 2019 | Pain and Glory | Dolor y gloria | Pedro Almodóvar | Spain |
| 2019 | The Painted Bird | Nabarvené ptáče | Václav Marhoul | Czech Republic / Slovakia / Ukraine |
| 2019 | Parasite | 기생충 | Bong Joon-ho | South Korea |

=== 2020s ===
| Year | Film | Original title | Director(s) | Country |
|---|---|---|---|---|
| 2020 | La Llorona | | Jayro Bustamante | Guatemala |
| 2020 | Another Round | Druk | Thomas Vinterberg | Denmark |
| 2020 | Atlantis | Атлантида | Valentyn Vasyanovych | Ukraine |
| 2020 | I'm No Longer Here | Ya no estoy aquí | Fernando Frías de la Parra | Mexico / United States |
| 2020 | Jallikattu | | Lijo Jose Pellissery | India |
| 2020 | My Little Sister | Schwesterlein | Stéphanie Chuat and Véronique Reymond | Switzerland |
| 2020 | A Sun | 陽光普照 | Chung Mong-hong | Taiwan |
| 2020 | Tove | | Zaida Bergroth | Finland / Sweden |
| 2020 | Two of Us | Deux | Filippo Meneghetti | France |
| 2021 | Drive My Car | ドライブ・マイ・カー | Ryusuke Hamaguchi | Japan |
| 2021 | Compartment No. 6 | Hytti Nro 6 | Juho Kuosmanen | Finland |
| 2021 | Flee | Flugt | Jonas Poher Rasmussen | Denmark |
| 2021 | The Good Boss | El buen patrón | Fernando León de Aranoa | Spain |
| 2021 | The Hand of God | È stata la mano di Dio | Paolo Sorrentino | Italy |
| 2021 | A Hero | قهرمان | Asghar Farhadi | Iran |
| 2021 | Prayers for the Stolen | Noche de Fuego | Tatiana Huezo | Mexico |
| 2021 | Titane | | Julia Ducournau | France |
| 2021 | The Worst Person in the World | Verdens verste menneske | Joachim Trier | Norway |
| 2022 | Argentina, 1985 | | Santiago Mitre | Argentina |
| 2022 | Bardo, False Chronicle of a Handful of Truths | Bardo, falsa crónica de unas cuantas verdades | Alejandro González Iñárritu | Mexico |
| 2022 | Close | | Lukas Dhont | Belgium |
| 2022 | Corsage | | Marie Kreutzer | Austria |
| 2022 | Decision to Leave | 헤어질 결심 | Park Chan-wook | South Korea |
| 2022 | Holy Spider | عنکبوت مقدس | Ali Abbasi | Denmark |
| 2022 | The Quiet Girl | An Cailín Ciúin | Colm Bairéad | Ireland |
| 2022 | War Sailor | Krigsseileren | Gunnar Vikene | Norway |
| 2023 | The Zone of Interest | | Jonathan Glazer | United Kingdom |
| 2023 | Anatomy of a Fall | Anatomie d'une chute | Justine Triet | France |
| 2023 | Blaga's Lessons | Уроците на Блага | Stephan Komandarev | Bulgaria |
| 2023 | Fallen Leaves | Kuolleet lehdet | Aki Kaurismäki | Finland |
| 2023 | Io capitano | | Matteo Garrone | Italy |
| 2023 | Society of the Snow | La sociedad de la nieve | J. A. Bayona | Spain |
| 2023 | The Teachers' Lounge | Das Lehrerzimmer | İlker Çatak | Germany |
| 2024 | Waves | Vlny | Jiří Mádl | Czech Republic |
| 2024 | The Girl with the Needle | Pigen med nålen | Magnus von Horn | Denmark |
| 2024 | I'm Still Here | Ainda Estou Aqui | Walter Salles | Brazil |
| 2024 | Queens | Reinas | Klaudia Reynicke | Switzerland |
| 2024 | The Seed of the Sacred Fig | دانه‌ی انجیر معابد | Mohammad Rasoulof | Germany |
| 2024 | The Wait | La espera | F. Javier Gutiérrez | Spain |
| 2025 | The Secret Agent | O Agente Secreto | Kleber Mendonça Filho | Brazil |
| 2025 | It Was Just an Accident | یک تصادف ساده | Jafar Panahi | France |
| 2025 | Late Shift | Heldin | Petra Volpe | Switzerland |
| 2025 | Little Trouble Girls | Kaj ti je deklica | Urška Djukić | Slovenia |
| 2025 | No Other Choice | 어쩔수가없다 | Park Chan-wook | South Korea |
| 2025 | Sentimental Value | Affeksjonsverdi | Joachim Trier | Norway |
| 2025 | Sirāt | | Óliver Laxe | Spain |
| 2025 | The Voice of Hind Rajab | صوت هند رجب | Kaouther Ben Hania | Tunisia |

== Multiple winners ==
Only 2 directors have won the award multiple times.

| Wins | Director |
|---|---|
| 4 | (Spain) Pedro Almodóvar |
| 2 | (Taiwan) Ang Lee |
