= Espen Sandberg =

Norwegian film director and advertising producer

- Born: 2 June 1971 (age 55); Sandefjord, Vestfold, Norway
- Occupations: Film director, advertising producer
- Years active: 1997–present
- Children: 3

Espen Sandberg (born 2 June 1971) is a Norwegian film director and advertising producer, best known for working with his childhood friend and director Joachim Rønning on films such as Bandidas (2006), Max Manus: Man of War (2008), Kon-Tiki (2012) and Pirates of the Caribbean: Dead Men Tell No Tales (2017). He received a nomination at 85th Academy Awards as well as 70th Golden Globe Awards for Best Foreign Language Film for directing 2012 movie Kon-Tiki with Rønning.

== Early life and career ==
Espen Sandberg was born in Sandefjord, Norway on 17 June 1971. Growing up in the 1980s, Sandberg and his childhood friend Joachim Rønning spent their free time making short films with Joachim's father's 30-pound home video camera, one of the few burdens for being the first of the video generation. He has two sons named Peder and Axel and one daughter named Ea.

In 1992 they both attended Stockholm Film School in Sweden, and graduated in 1994. Later that year they served their mandatory time in the military making propaganda films for the Royal Norwegian Army. In 1995 they founded their own company. They called it "Roenberg", which is their last names put together. Early in 1996 they began directing commercials and music videos professionally in Oslo. Their extensive and award-winning work in commercials in Scandinavia led to major international commissions such as ads for Airbus, Nintendo, Coca-Cola, GE and Nokia. Sandberg and Rønning established themselves in the American market with their spots for Capital One, Labatt's and especially with their USA Today Super Bowl 2001 Viewer's Poll-winning spot Rex for Budweiser. Together with fellow Norwegian director, Harald Zwart, they own and run Motion Blur, a production house for commercials. Founded in 2002 it is now one of the largest and most award-winning productions companies in Scandinavia.

== 2006–present ==
In 2006, the duo directed the French-produced comedy western Bandidas in Mexico, starring Salma Hayek and Penélope Cruz; it tells the tale of two very different women who become a bank robbing duo in an effort to combat a ruthless enforcer terrorising their town. In Norway, Rønning and Sandberg are best known for directing the 2008 blockbuster movie Max Manus: Man of War, with Aksel Hennie in the leading role; the story follows Manus (Aksel Hennie) from the Winter War against the Soviet Union, through the outbreak of World War II and the occupation of Norway by Nazi Germany until peacetime in 1945. In the same year they won Lions at Cannes for their Hydro Commercials Train Loop.

In 2012, Sandberg and Rønning became involved in a movie based on Thor Heyerdahl and the Kon-Tiki expedition. The development of this new film was shown in an exhibition at the Kon-Tiki Museum in Oslo. The film was released in 2012 to great reviews; Rotten Tomatoes reported that 83% of the critics gave a positive review, writing: "A well-crafted retelling of an epic true story, Kon-Tiki is a throwback to old-school adventure filmmaking that's exciting and entertaining in spite of its by-the-book plotting." The picture went on to be nominated for Best Foreign Language Film at the 85th Academy Awards and 70th Golden Globe Awards, along with several other high-profile accolades such as the Satellite Awards and the Norwegian Amanda Award.

Sandberg and Rønning directed the fifth installment of the Pirates of the Caribbean series, Pirates of the Caribbean: Dead Men Tell No Tales (2017).

== Filmography ==
=== Director ===
Solo works

- Amundsen (2019, also executive producer)
- Infinite Worlds (2019, commercial)

With Joachim Rønning

Year	Title	Notes
1997	Dag 1	Short film (Also writer)
2006	Bandidas	
2008	Max Manus: Man of War	
2012	Kon-Tiki	
2014—2016	Marco Polo	Directed episodes "The Wayfarer" and "The Wolf and the Deer"; Also executive producer
2017	Pirates of the Caribbean: Dead Men Tell No Tales	

=== Executive producer only ===
- Beatles (2014)
- Cadaver (2020)
- Troll (2022)
- Christmas as Usual (2023)

== Awards and nominations ==
Year	Title	Award/Nomination
2008	Max Manus: Man of War	Nominated- Amanda Award for Best Direction
2012	Kon-Tiki	Palm Springs International Film Festival for Directors to watch Nominated- Academy Award for Best Foreign Language Film; Nominated- Amanda Award for Best Direction; Nominated- Golden Globe Award for Best Foreign Language Film; Nominated- Satellite Award for Best Foreign Language Film
