= Bandidas =

2006 Western action comedy film

- Theatrical release poster
- Directed by: Joachim Rønning; Espen Sandberg
- Written by: Luc Besson; Robert Mark Kamen
- Produced by: Luc Besson; Ariel Zeitoun
- Starring: Salma Hayek; Penélope Cruz; Steve Zahn; Sam Shepard; Dwight Yoakam; Ismael 'East' Carlo
- Cinematography: Thierry Arbogast
- Edited by: Frédéric Thoraval
- Music by: Éric Serra
- Production companies: EuropaCorp; TF1 Films Production; Canal+ TPS Star
- Distributed by: EuropaCorp Distribution (France); 20th Century Fox (United States and Mexico)
- Release date: 3 February 2006
- Running time: 93 minutes
- Countries: France; Mexico; United States
- Languages: English; Spanish; French
- Budget: $35 million
- Box office: $18.4 million

Bandidas is a 2006 Western action comedy film directed by Norwegian directors Joachim Rønning and Espen Sandberg, in their feature directorial debut, and produced and co-written by Luc Besson. Starring Salma Hayek and Penélope Cruz, it tells the tale of two very different women in late-19th-century Mexico who become a bank robbing duo in an effort to combat a ruthless enforcer terrorizing their town.

This is the first film that Cruz and Hayek starred in together. It was an international co-production between France, the United States and Mexico. Filming took place in Sierra de Órganos National Park in the town of Sombrerete, Mexico, as well as in the Mexican states of Durango and San Luis Potosí. Released on February 3, 2006, it received mixed reviews from critics.

== Plot ==
In 1880 Mexico, María Álvarez is an uneducated, poor farm girl whose caring father is being forced off his land by a cruel U.S. land baron named Tyler Jackson. Sara Sandoval is the highly educated, wealthy daughter of the arrogant owner of the nearby properties, and has recently returned from Europe where she attended numerous grade schools and colleges in England, Spain, and France for several years. In one fell swoop, both María's and Sara's fathers fall under attack by the baron (Sara's father is killed, María's is shot but survives), giving him free rein in the nearby territories. As an act of revenge, María and Sara team up to become bank robbers, stealing and giving back to the poor Mexicans who have lost their lands.

At first, the pair's relationship is characterized by petty cattiness stemming in part from their different backgrounds, but under the tutelage of famed bank robber Bill Buck they learn to trust each other. During their crucial training session at the edge of a cliff, the two women test their strength by hanging from a metal bar over a wide river. At the point of exhaustion María tells Sara she cannot swim before losing her grip on the bar. Sara voluntarily drops into the river and saves her. The two women put aside their differences and agree that, while they are not friends, they can at least work together as partners. María turns out to be a crack shot and, while Sara can barely hold a gun, she shows that she is an expert with throwing knives.

Angered by the recent attacks by two women, who are now known by the public as the "Bandidas", Jackson brings in a specialist criminal investigator named Quentin Cooke. When Sara and María learn this, they capture Cooke and seduce him to help them. He has already figured out that Sara's father was murdered and therefore discovers that his client is a criminal.

The trio embark upon bigger, more ambitious heists, during which María and Sara compete for Quentin's affections. In a move to make the money they have stolen useless, Jackson moves the gold that backs the money on a train up towards U.S. territories. Midway, he decides to steal the gold, betraying the Mexican government. The Bandidas hunt him down, but when they get their chance to kill him, they decline to do so, feeling it would make them no better than him. Jackson manages to draw his gun and almost gets a shot off at María but Sara shoots first, killing him. Quentin meets with his fiancée, much to María's heartbreak. She and Sara ride off into the sunset, their eyes set on Europe, where Sara says the banks are bigger.

== Cast ==
- Salma Hayek as Sara Sandoval
- Penélope Cruz as María Álvarez
- Steve Zahn as Quentin Cooke
- Dwight Yoakam as Tyler Jackson
- Denis Arndt as Ashe
- Audra Blaser as Clarissa Ashe
- Sam Shepard as Bill Buck
- Ismael 'East' Carlo as Don Diego Sandoval
- Carlos Cervantes as Pedro
- Joseph D. Reitman as Regulator
- Jose Maria Negri as Padre Pablo
- Edgar Vivar as The Bank Manager

== Release and reception ==
Bandidas earned $18,381,890 worldwide including $3,153,999 in Mexico and $2,380,000 in Russia. The film earned mixed to positive reviews, with a 56% out of 16 reviews on Rotten Tomatoes.

== See also ==
- Viva Maria!
