= Penny Rose =

British costume designer

- Education: London Academy of Music and Dramatic Art
- Occupation: Costume designer
- Years active: 1976–present

Penny Rose is a British costume designer who has worked in the film industry since the 1970s. Rose has been nominated for the BAFTA Award for Best Costume Design three times for the films Evita (1996), Pirates of the Caribbean: The Curse of the Black Pearl (2003), and Pirates of the Caribbean: Dead Man's Chest (2006).

== Career ==
Rose's costume design career began in the West End theatres of London, following time spent on various theatre projects as a teenager in Windsor. She studied stage management while attending the London Academy of Music and Dramatic Art. Due to her fluency in Italian, she acquired a job as an assistant and buyer for the high fashion label Fiorucci in Milan, which introduced her to important people in the fashion and film industries.

One of her first film collaborations was with the director Alan Parker, when they worked together on the 1982 film Pink Floyd – The Wall. She again joined Parker on his directional projects The Road to Wellville (1994) and Evita (1996). Also in 1996, she served as the costume designer for Mission: Impossible, her first major action film in a career with many of them; by 2010, Rose was described by Deborah Nadoolman Landis as being a "recognized master of the epic." For the 2004 film King Arthur, another large-budget production, Rose designed costumes that evoked "fifth-century rock stars".

Rose began her collaboration with the director Gore Verbinski in Pirates of the Caribbean: The Curse of the Black Pearl (2003). To craft the look of Jack Sparrow (Johnny Depp), she drew inspiration from the illustrator Howard Pyle. Nadoolman Landis describes Rose's design for Depp as "the iconic prototype for pirate wear, reviving a long-dead genre." Rose returned to work on the second and third films in the Pirates series, Dead Man's Chest (2006) and At World's End (2007), which were filmed simultaneously. Rose also worked on On Stranger Tides (2011) and Dead Men Tell No Tales (2017). Rose again served as costume designer on another Depp film, The Lone Ranger (2013). For 47 Ronin (2013), she oversaw the production of 998 costumes and 400 suits of armour.

Rose received her first Emmy nomination for the 2010 miniseries The Pacific. She has been nominated for the BAFTA Award for Best Costume Design three times: for the films Evita (1996), Pirates of the Caribbean: The Curse of the Black Pearl (2003), and Pirates of the Caribbean: Dead Man's Chest (2006).

== Filmography ==
Adapted from:

- Whose Child Am I? (1976)
- The Brute (1977)
- The Bitch (1979)
- Quest for Fire (1981)
- Pink Floyd – The Wall (1982)
- Another Country (1984)
- Cal (1984)
- The Commitments (1991)
- Splitting Heirs (1993)
- Map of the Human Heart (1993)
- Shadowlands (1993)
- The Road to Wellville (1994)
- Carrington (1995)
- Mission: Impossible (1996)
- Evita (1996)
- In Love and War (1996)
- The Parent Trap (1998)
- Neanderthal (2001) (TV documentary)
- Just Visiting (2001)
- Confessions of an Ugly Stepsister (2002)
- The Good Thief (2002)
- The Sleeping Dictionary (2003)
- Pirates of the Caribbean: The Curse of the Black Pearl (2003)
- King Arthur (2004)
- The Weather Man (2005)
- Pirates of the Caribbean: Dead Man's Chest (2006)
- Wild Hogs (2007)
- Pirates of the Caribbean: At World's End (2007)
- St Trinian's (2007)
- Made of Honor (2008)
- Prince of Persia: The Sands of Time (2010)
- The Pacific (2010) (TV miniseries)
- Unstoppable (2010)
- Pirates of the Caribbean: On Stranger Tides (2011)
- The Lone Ranger (2013)
- 47 Ronin (2013)
- Pirates of the Caribbean: Dead Men Tell No Tales (2017)
- The Mummy (2017)
- Men in Black: International (2019)

As herself:

- Prop Culture (2020) Episode: "Pirates of the Caribbean: Curse of the Black Pearl"
