= Kon-Tiki (2012 film) =

- Norwegian theatrical release poster
- Directed by: Joachim Rønning; Espen Sandberg
- Written by: Petter Skavlan
- Produced by: Jeremy Thomas; Aage Aaberge
- Starring: Pål Sverre Hagen; Anders Baasmo Christiansen; Tobias Santelmann; Gustaf Skarsgård; Odd-Magnus Williamson; Jakob Oftebro; Agnes Kittelsen
- Cinematography: Geir Hartly Andreassen
- Edited by: Per-Erik Eriksen; Martin Stoltz
- Music by: Johan Söderqvist
- Production companies: Recorded Picture Company; Nordisk Film; DCM Productions; Film i Väst; Roenbergfilm
- Distributed by: Nordisk Film (Scandinavia); DCM Film Distribution (Germany and Switzerland); The Weinstein Company (United States, Canada, United Kingdom and Italy); Soda Pictures (United Kingdom and Ireland)
- Release date: 24 August 2012
- Running time: 119 minutes (Norwegian language); 114 minutes (English language)
- Countries: Norway; Denmark; Germany; Sweden; United Kingdom
- Languages: Norwegian; English
- Budget: 93 million NOK (c. US$15.5 million)
- Box office: $22.8 million

Kon-Tiki is a 2012 historical drama film directed by Joachim Rønning and Espen Sandberg about the 1947 Kon-Tiki expedition. The film was mainly shot on the island of Malta. The role of Thor Heyerdahl is played by Pål Sverre Hagen. The film was an international co-production between Norway, Denmark, Germany, Sweden and the United Kingdom.

It was the highest-grossing film of 2012 in Norway and the country's most expensive production to date. The film was nominated for the Academy Award for Best Foreign Language Film at the 85th Academy Awards. It is Norway's fifth Academy Award nomination. The film was also nominated for a Golden Globe Award for Best Foreign Language Film at the 70th Golden Globe Awards. It is the first time a Norwegian film has been nominated for both an Oscar and a Golden Globe.

== Plot ==
The film is the dramatized story of Thor Heyerdahl and his Kon-Tiki expedition of 1947.

While the prevailing theories of the time held that Polynesia had been settled by peoples originating from Asia, Heyerdahl, an experimental ethnographer and adventurer, sets out to prove his theory that people from South America settled the islands in pre-Columbian times.

Noting similarities between statues found in South America and the Polynesian moai, Heyerdahl's theory about the origin of the Polynesian people is bolstered by Polynesian folklore that tells of an ancient tribe called the Hanau epe that are said to have once inhabited Easter Island. While most experts hold that such a voyage across the vast ocean is unlikely to have ever been successful, in order to illustrate that there were no technological limitations that would have inhibited the ancient peoples from making the journey, Heyerdahl puts his theory to the test and builds a balsawood raft using the same techniques that would have been utilized 1,500 years ago by the indigenous peoples of the region. Though he himself cannot swim or sail, he sets out on the treacherous 4,300-nautical-mile (8,000 km; 4,900 mi) journey across the Pacific from Peru to Polynesia aboard the small raft, along with his crew of five men (and a macaw named Lorita).

During the three months aboard the primitive vessel named after Inca god of sun and storm, Kon-Tiki, the crew's scientific reenactment of the legendary voyage from the coast of Peru to the Polynesian islands is met with setbacks in the form of storms, sharks and other perils of the open sea.

With support from the U.S. government, he eventually reaches Polynesia. He then returns home, after divorcing from his wife, and decides to open the Kon-Tiki Museum in Oslo.

== Cast ==
- Pål Sverre Hagen as Thor Heyerdahl, the expedition leader who seeks to prove with his expedition that Polynesia was settled from South America. After living on Fatu Hiva and studying the Ancient peoples of South America and Polynesia he believed that there was a link between the two.
- Anders Baasmo Christiansen as Herman Watzinger, an engineer in charge of technical and meteorological measurements on board. He was the first to join Heyerdahl's expedition.
- Tobias Santelmann as Knut Haugland, the crew's radio expert and a decorated war hero known for his participation in the Norwegian heavy water sabotage that prevented the Germans from developing what was believed to be an atomic bomb.
- Gustaf Skarsgård as Bengt Danielsson, a Swedish ethnographer in charge of supplies and daily rations. He served as the crew's translator, as he was the only member who was fluent in Spanish.
- Odd-Magnus Williamson as Erik Hesselberg, the crew's navigator, artist and a childhood friend of Heyerdahl. He also painted the large Kon-Tiki figure on the raft's sail.
- Jakob Oftebro as Torstein Raaby, the crew's telegraphist who was also well known for hiding behind German lines during WW2, spying on the German battleship Tirpitz. His radio transmissions were decisive for the Allied bombing raid that sank the ship.
- Agnes Kittelsen as Liv Heyerdahl (née Coucheron-Torp), Thor's wife who finds herself more and more estranged by her husband's ambitions.
- Manuel Cauchi as José Bustamante y Rivero, the 33rd President of Peru who agrees to fund Heyerdahl's expedition through his contacts in the U.S. Navy.
- Søren Pilmark as Peter Freuchen, a Danish explorer and anthropologist known for Arctic exploration, especially the Thule Expeditions. He also encourages Heyerdahl to apply native techniques in order to succeed with the expedition.
- Peter Wight as Prof. Herbert Spinden, an American anthropologist and archeologist whose rejection of Heyerdahl's theory prompts the expedition to take place.

== Production ==
=== Filming ===
Principal photography for Kon-Tiki took place in Norway, Malta, Bulgaria, Thailand, Sweden and the Maldives over a period of three-and-a-half months. Against the advice of many, the filmmakers decided to shoot the ocean scenes on the open ocean rather than on a set, insisting that the "unique challenges" they faced from shooting on the ocean actually strengthen the film.

=== Language ===
In an unusual technique, the film was shot simultaneously in Norwegian and English, with each scene being filmed twice, first in Norwegian and then in English. This resulted in two versions of the film to be released, one primarily for the Norwegian domestic market, the other for an international audience. In a few cases, such as action scenes and computer-generated sequences, they used the same shot, later adding English with dubbing.

== Historical accuracy ==
While much of the story is historically accurate, screenwriter Petter Skavlan and director Joachim Rønning both felt the need to make the story more exciting for their two-hour feature film. The fictionalized elements have been criticized. Film critic Andrew Barker commented: "It's frustratingly ironic that Kon-Tiki's most outrageously fantastical sequences are completely verifiable, and its most predictable, workaday conflicts are completely made up".

One inaccuracy is the absence of indigenous Polynesians from the cast. The scenes depicting Heyerdahl's experiences on Fatu Hiva were shot in Thailand with Thai extras who do not resemble native Polynesians, and who are shown holding compound spears not typical of the Marquesas Islands, and weaving rattan baskets, of which neither the technique nor the plant material are native to French Polynesia.

The film focuses on Heyerdahl's theory that Polynesia was first populated with humans from Peru, but it ignores the Norwegian's more ethnocentric speculations that the original Kon-Tiki voyage was undertaken by a race of tall white bearded people with red hair. Heyerdahl conjectured that Amerindian civilizations like the Aztecs and the Incas only arose with the help of advanced technical knowledge brought by early European voyagers, and that these white people were eventually driven out of Peru and fled westward on rafts.

The film has the crew worrying about getting sucked into "the Galapagos maelstrom", with a book shown that purportedly illustrates the maelstrom. The illustration is actually artist Harry Clarke's 1919 illustration for Edgar Allan Poe's short story, "A Descent Into the Maelström", a fictional account of a whirlpool in Norwegian waters. The description of its roar, which can be heard from nine miles away, is taken directly from Poe's story. Although Heyerdahl did refer to "treacherous eddies" near the Galapagos, his chief worry there was that "strong ocean currents" could sweep the raft back towards Central America.

The portrayal of the raft's second-in-command, Herman Watzinger, proved controversial in Norway. Colleagues and relatives say Watzinger in the film is unlike the real-life Watzinger, physically or in his actions. Actor Baasmo Christiansen acknowledged the physical differences with a smile: "Watzinger was tall, dark, and Norwegian Youth Champion in the 100 meter. He was everything I'm not". In the film, Watzinger disobeys Heyerdahl's direct order and throws a harpoon at a whale shark under the boat, but it was actually Erik Hesselberg who harpooned the whale shark, with the crew cheering him on. The film's Watzinger, worried about the hemp ropes' ability to hold the balsa logs together for the entire voyage, tearfully begs Heyerdahl at sea to add steel cables Watzinger smuggled aboard but Heyerdahl's book contains no such scene and Watzinger's daughter has stated it never happened: "My father was a stout and confident man, and he never thought that way about the balsa logs and the ropes". Thor Heyerdahl Jr., who worked with Watzinger, concurred in the criticism of the film's portrayal of Watzinger. It should further be pointed out that Heyerdahl in his book explicitly notes that because of the light properties of the balsa logs, the ropes were not worn down, but instead ate into the logs and that using steel cables (that had been suggested) would have worsened the problem. Movie Watzinger's solution would have been harmful to the raft, but that is not explained.

Other minor alterations from Heyerdahl's book include the ship's parrot being eaten by a shark in the film (its real-life counterpart was simply washed overboard by a large wave). The film also shows the crew only getting access to valuable US military equipment once they have arrived in Peru and are building the raft, whereas Heyerdahl in fact arranged for the equipment at a visit to the Pentagon before traveling to Peru.

== Release ==
The film premiered on 18 August 2012 at the 40th Norwegian International Film Festival in Haugesund. A North American screening took place at the Toronto International Film Festival.

The Weinstein Company acquired the distribution rights for the United States, Canada, United Kingdom and Italy in November 2012.

=== Box office ===
Kon-Tiki opened in Norway on 24 August 2012, setting a weekend national box office record. It became the highest-grossing film of 2012 in Norway, earning $14,111,514, and overtaking the film Max Manus: Man of War, also by directors Rønning and Sandberg.

=== Critical response ===
Kon-Tiki opened in the United States on 26 April 2013 in a limited release, and was screened in three cinemas. Later on May 3, the film expanded to screen in fifty more cinemas and was a major box office success in its home country, Norway, in addition to gathering critical acclaim internationally.

The Hollywood Reporter's Sheri Linden says of Kon-Tiki: "This retelling of a bare-bones enterprise by six men took a crew of hundreds, and the results are nothing if not polished, with handsome period detail and visual effects that are convincing, if sometimes ostentatious. The widescreen lensing (the film was shot mainly in and around Malta) doesn't overdo the sense of wonder and, with a strong assist from the sound design, conveys the men's vulnerability to the elements".

Andrew Barker of Variety notes that some may take issue with the artistic license the filmmakers took in dramatizing some of the characters and events of the voyage, but describes the film overall as "a visually impeccable, professionally crafted modern vessel that lacks any of the patched-together soul of its subject".

While Michael Nordine of LA Weekly laments that Kon-Tiki "could have used a bit more [shark-attracting] blood in the water" and concedes that the "crystal-clear waves are a sight to behold nevertheless".

Kon-Tiki has an approval rating of 81% on review aggregator website Rotten Tomatoes, based on 81 reviews, and an average rating of 7/10. The site's consensus is: "A well-crafted retelling of an epic true story, Kon-Tiki is a throwback to old-school adventure filmmaking that's exciting and entertaining in spite of its by-the-book plotting". On Metacritic, the film has a 62/100 rating based on 23 critics, indicating "generally favorable reviews".

== Accolades ==
Award	Category	Recipient(s)	Result
85th Academy Awards	Best Foreign Language Film	Kon-Tiki	Nominated
70th Golden Globe Awards	Best Foreign Language Film	Kon-Tiki	Nominated
40th Norwegian International Film Festival	Publikumsprisen (Audience Award)	Kon-Tiki	Won
17th Satellite Awards	Best Foreign Language Film	Kon-Tiki	Nominated
17th Satellite Awards	Best Sound	Baard H. Ingebretsen, Tormod Ringes	Nominated
Amanda Awards	Best Film	Aage Aaberge and Jeremy Thomas	Nominated
Amanda Awards	People's Amanda	Joachim Rønning and Espen Sandberg	Won
Amanda Awards	Best Actor	Pål Sverre Hagen	Won

== See also ==
- Kon-Tiki (1950)
- List of submissions to the 85th Academy Awards for Best Foreign Language Film
- List of Norwegian submissions for the Academy Award for Best Foreign Language Film
- Survival film
