= Joachim Rønning =

Norwegian filmmaker (born 1972)

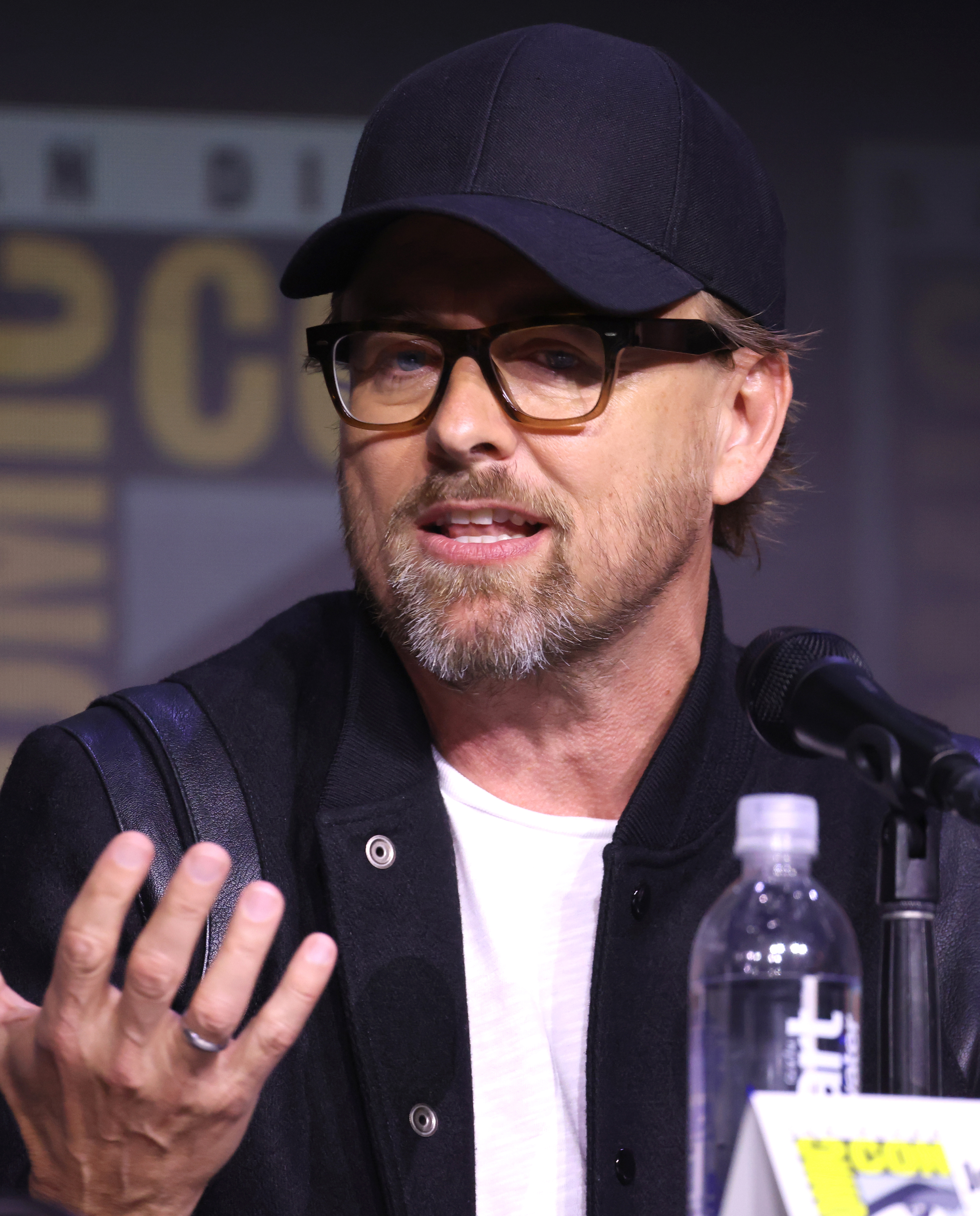
- Rønning in 2025
- Born: 30 May 1972 (age 54); Sandefjord, Vestfold, Norway
- Occupation: Filmmaker
- Years active: 1997–present
- Spouse: Amanda Hearst (m. 2019)
- Children: 4

Joachim Rønning (born 30 May 1972) is a Norwegian filmmaker whose credits include Kon-Tiki and the Disney action-adventure films Pirates of the Caribbean: Dead Men Tell No Tales and Maleficent: Mistress of Evil. Rønning's films have grossed more than 1.3 billion dollars at the box office. As of October 2025, Rønning's most recent work is directing Disney's Tron: Ares.

== Early life ==
Rønning grew up in Sandefjord, Norway, a small coastal town south of Oslo. At the age of 12, his parents bought their first home video camera. According to Rønning, "...it was a bulky affair, but it was love at first sight." He spent his teenage years making short films and shooting commercials for local businesses, often using homemade camera rigs strapped to skateboards. When asked what inspired him to become a filmmaker, Rønning said his father being a part of the local theater company immersed his young self with experience of sitting backstage and having views of the productions' inner workings.

In 1992, he attended Stockholms Filmskola in Sweden, graduating in 1994.

== Career ==
In 2006, Rønning and Espen Sandberg directed their feature film debut, Bandidas, starring Penélope Cruz and Salma Hayek, and written and produced by French filmmaker Luc Besson.

In December 2008, Rønning's first Norwegian film, Max Manus: Man of War, premiered. Max Manus was the highest-grossing Norwegian movie of all time, at over 1.2 million tickets sold in Norway. The film's North American premiere was at the 2009 Toronto International Film Festival.

Kon-Tiki premiered at the Toronto International Film Festival in September 2012. In 2013, Kon-Tiki was nominated for both a Golden Globe and an Academy Award in the best foreign language category. This is the first Norwegian film to be nominated for the awards.

The success of Kon-Tiki led to Rønning and Sandberg directing a film in the Pirates of the Caribbean franchise for Jerry Bruckheimer and Disney. Filmed on location in Australia, Pirates of the Caribbean: Dead Men Tell No Tales went on to earn close to US$800 million at the box office worldwide.

Rønning's next movie Maleficent: Mistress of Evil starring Angelina Jolie, Elle Fanning and Michelle Pfeiffer for Disney, premiered in the fall of 2019 to become the third highest October release of all time and eventually grossing half a billion dollars worldwide.

His next feature was Young Woman and The Sea, starring Daisy Ridley, which tells the story of Gertrude Ederle's historic swim across the English Channel. The production of the movie was challenging due to Rønning's desire to shoot everything in open water. The film premiered in May 2024 to critical acclaim. He described this work as "the most intense movie [he's] ever done", alluding to his dedication to make sure that the story be shot on the open sea.

In January 2023, Rønning took the helm of the next chapter in the Tron franchise for Disney. The film, titled Tron: Ares, stars Jared Leto, Greta Lee, Jeff Bridges, Jodi Turner-Smith, and Evan Peters. Tron: Ares premiered in October 2025.

In September 2026, he set up the horror film System at Spooky Pictures and Image Nation Studios, directing from his own script co-written with brother Andreas Rønning. Freya Allan, Denzel Baidoo and Felix Edwards star in the film, which was shot on location in the old, abandoned underground stations and tunnels under London. Roy Lee and Steven Schneider serve as producers. Filming wrapped on December 2026.

=== Upcoming and unrealized projects ===
Rønning will also be directing Here Be Monsters, a sci-fi thriller that he co-wrote with his brother Andreas Rønning. The film was brought to Scott Free Productions and rewritten by Noah Harpster and Micah Fitzerman-Blue. In 2025, the film was acquired by Paramount Pictures.

Rønning was attached to many projects that have not been made as of 2025, including Origin for Paramount Studios and Bruckheimer. Rønning was set to direct an adaptation of the last Michael Crichton novel, Micro. The Kiss biopic, Shout It Out Loud, named from one of the band's songs, was to be directed by Rønning, but he was replaced by McG.

Rønning also referenced he has "a couple of projects" that may be set in Europe. Noting that he would like for his next opus to be "something that [he's] developed [himself].

== Personal life ==
Rønning has two daughters from a previous relationship. He married philanthropist Amanda Hearst in 2019, with whom he has two sons.

== Filmography ==
=== Short film ===
Year	Title	Notes
1997	Dag 1	Co-directed with Espen Sandberg
2007	Kubisten	Also writer

=== Feature film ===
Director

Year	Title	Notes
2006	Bandidas	Co-directed with Espen Sandberg
2008	Max Manus: Man of War	Co-directed with Espen Sandberg
2012	Kon-Tiki	Co-directed with Espen Sandberg
2017	Pirates of the Caribbean: Dead Men Tell No Tales	Co-directed with Espen Sandberg
2019	Maleficent: Mistress of Evil	
2024	Young Woman and the Sea	Also executive producer
2025	Tron: Ares	
TBA	System	Also producer; Filming

Executive producer

- Beatles (2014)

=== Television ===
Year	Title	Director	Executive producer	Notes
2014–2016	Marco Polo	Yes	Yes	Co-directed with Espen Sandberg
2017	Doomsday	Yes	Yes	Television film
