= Fireback (film) =

1983 film by Teddy Page

- Directed by: Teddy Page
- Starring: Richard Harrison; Bruce Baron; James Gaines
- Release date: 1983

Fireback is a Filipino low-budget action movie directed by Teddy Page (Teddy Chiu) and starring Richard Harrison, Bruce Baron, James Gaines, Ann Milhench, Gwendolyn Hung, Mike Monty, Ronnie Patterson, and Ruel Vernal.

== Characters ==
Jack Kaplan (Richard Harrison) is a US Army Soldier and Weapons Expert who "can turn an ordinary soft drink straw into a weapon". After being rescued from a POW camp, he returns home only to find his wife missing.

Duffy Collins (Bruce Baron) is a gangster who falls for and is rejected by Jack Kaplan's wife Diane, after which he kidnaps and eventually kills her.

Diane (Ann Milhench), is Jack Kaplan's wife who becomes the target of the amorous advances of Duffy Collins. Collins kidnaps her because she denies him. Diane is killed by Collins in a moment of rage after trying to escape.

Eve (Gwendolyn Hung) is a treacherous, bleached-blonde femme fatale working for Duffy Collins, who works as a dancer in a nightclub. She tries to seduce Jack Kaplan, fails and is accidentally killed by Man with the Golden Hand.

Digger (James Gaines) is a small-time crook and informer, who leads Jack Kaplan towards Duffy Collins and is killed for that by the Man with the Golden Hand.

Man with the Golden Hand (Ruel Vernal) is a tracksuit-wearing hitman with a "golden hand", working for Duffy Collins. He kills Digger and Eve, after which he is disposed of by Jack Kaplan.

Police Chief (Mike Monty) goes after Jack Kaplan after he is wrongly suspected of killing a minor bad guy.

Deputy (Ronnie Patterson) is the sidekick of Police Chief, out to capture Jack Kaplan.

Cat Burglar (Ron David) is a villain working for Duffy Collins, who is killed by Jack Kaplan.

Shadow (Tony Aaron) is a ninja working for Duffy Collins, who is killed by Jack Kaplan.

== Plot ==
Jack Kaplan is a US Army Soldier and Weapons Expert kept as a POW somewhere in Vietnam, Cambodia or Laos (the script is never quite clear on that). Liberated by a "rescue team", he returns home to the United States only to find out that his wife Diane has been captured by infatuated gangster Duffy Collins. Kaplan embarks on a mission to find his wife, running into characters like Digger, Man With The Golden Hand, and the treacherous femme fatale Eve. Diane is killed by Collins while trying to escape him, and the storyline turns extremely confusing. Collins sends bizarrely named hitmen like Cat Burglar and Panther out to kill Jack Kaplan, who dispatches all of them. Kaplan ends up suspected of the murder of one of the minor baddies (whom he didn't actually kill) and a fugitive from the law. Mike Monty and Ronnie Patterson show up as policemen, who eventually track Kaplan down to a junkyard where he's been hiding. Kaplan escapes with the help of his customized car and a combination of a bazooka, a crossbow and a shotgun. The setting switches from the US to "the jungle". Kaplan kills a legion of policemen on his trail and is wounded in the process. He holes up in a "jungle" cave, where he's attacked by a ninja called Shadow, who is one of the henchmen of Duffy Collins. Kaplan kills Shadow, masquerades as him and infiltrates the stronghold of Collins, where he, after a short fight, disposes of him with Shadow's samurai sword.

== Memorable lines ==
"He can turn an ordinary soft drink straw into a weapon."-Mike Monty describing Richard Harrison to Ronnie Patterson.

"He's heading for the jungle!"-Policemen chasing after Richard Harrison. (The film is supposedly set in the United States.)

== Reviews ==
Fireback has never been reviewed or featured in print much of anywhere. The IMDb gives it a votes average of 4.9. Richard Harrison wrote a short piece on Fireback and the Silver Star films for the book Gods in Polyester, where he recalls his (generally negative) experiences working in the Philippines, with additional anecdotes on James Gaines, Teddy Page and Romano Kristoff. Beyond that, Fireback has fallen into complete obscurity. Excluding minor notoriety among fans of "no-budget" Filipino Z-movies and Richard Harrison completists.

The movie provided inspiration for the Collapsed Lung song "Codename: Omega" on their 1996 album Cooler ("Omega" was the codename for the elaborate weapon Jack Kaplan wielded in the film).
