= John Gale (director) =

Filipino film director

John Gale, born Jun Gallardo, was a Filipino B-movie director, who started his career with martial arts movies in the 1970s and continued to Z-movie actioners in the 1980s, often produced by K.Y. Lim's Silver Star Film Company. Silver Star was a notorious but prolific producer of extremely low-budget action films, characterized by very low production values.

Gale directed Richard Harrison in Intrusion Cambodia AKA Rescue Team (1981), also starring a cast of Silver Star workhorses such as Romano Kristoff, James Gaines, and Mike Monty. The assistant director of Intrusion Cambodia was Teddy Page, another prolific Silver Star director. Gale directed Kristoff and Monty again in Slash (1984), a film influenced by the Rambo series starring Sylvester Stallone, to the point of plagiarism. Slash also featured Nick Nicholson and Gwendolyn Hung. Another film of debatable note was Commando Invasion (1986), which featured Gordon Mitchell, Ken Watanabe (not to be confused with the more famous Ken Watanabe) and former model Tetchie Agbayani (as Carol Roberts, also in Intrusion Cambodia). Gale also directed Christopher Mitchum thrice, in Master Samurai (1974), Commander Firefox (1983) and SFX Retaliator (1987).
