= Mike Monty =

American actor

- Born: October 23, 1936; Chattanooga, Tennessee, U.S.
- Died: August 4, 2006 (aged 69); Rome, Italy
- Occupation: Film actor

Mike Monty (October 23, 1936 – August 4, 2006) was an American character actor, born in 1936 in Chattanooga, Tennessee as Michael O'Donoghue but he changed his name to Mike Monty late in life.

== Career ==
He left the United States for Italy in the early 1960s, where he started a modest film career as a supporting actor, appearing mostly in spaghetti westerns, sexploitation and horror. Many of his appearances were uncredited. Some were credited as Mike Monti, Michael Monty or Mike Monte.

One of the more infamous films he acted in during the 70s was the Nazi-exploitation epic Achtung! The Desert Tigers, directed by Paolo Solvay and starring fellow American expatriates Richard Harrison and Gordon Mitchell (with whom Monty shared an apartment for several years in Italy). Solvay was notorious for recycling scenes from film to film. Achtung! The Desert Tigers was no exception to the rule, featuring footage from his World War II epic Quando Suana la Campana AKA When the Bell Tolls (1970).

In the early 1980s Monty relocated to the Philippines, where he began a very prolific career in Z-movie actioners, many of them made for Silver Star Film Company (called Kinavesa in the Philippines), produced by K.Y. Lim. Over the decade, he appeared in countless low-budget Filipino features and some Italian productions shot in the archipelago, often cast as a military officer or a policeman, in parts very similar to Richard Crenna in First Blood.

He made several films with fellow Filipino Exploitation actors Romano Kristoff, James Gaines, Mike Cohen, Bruce Baron, Ann Milhench, Gwendolyn Hung, Ronnie Patterson, and directors Teddy Page (Teddy Chiu) and John Gale (Jun Gallardo). One of his larger roles from the Filipino period was in the Rambo imitation Slash, directed by Gale and starring Kristoff and Hung. Monty also appeared in many of the films Richard Harrison made in the Philippines: as a POW in Intrusion Cambodia AKA Rescue Team, a police chief in Fireback and as a gangster in Blood Debts. The Silver Star films, otherwise fallen into obscurity, have become minor cult items among some bad movie fans.

His more well-known films from the 1980s were Italian productions such as The Atlantis Interceptors, directed by Ruggero Deodato and starring former Peyton Place star Christopher Connelly and Tony King, and Captain Yankee, directed by Antonio Margheriti and starring Connelly and Lee Van Cleef. Arguably one of Monty's better Philippines-shot films was the American low-budget Vietnam War film Dog Tags for director Romano Scavolini. He also had a very small part in the Fred Williamson vehicle Black Cobra 2.

His acting career dwindled with the near demise of the Filipino film industry at the turn of the 90s. Remaining in the Philippines, he kept occasionally appearing in Japanese productions shot in the Philippines and in some exploitation films shot in the archipel by Bruno Mattei. He died of a heart attack on August 4, 2006, in Rome, Italy, while doing post-production work for a Mattei film.

== Filmography ==
- Five for Hell (1969)
- Man of the East (1972)
- Dr. Frankenstein's Castle of Freaks (1974)
- Achtung! The Desert Tigers (1977)
- Fireback (credited as a 1978 film on IMDb, more likely from the early '80s)
- The Atlantis Interceptors (1983)
- Blood Debts AKA Eliminator (1983)
- Intrusion Cambodia AKA Rescue Team (1984)
- Slash (1984)
- Ninja's Force (1985)
- Ninja Warriors (1985)
- Captain Yankee (1985)
- Strike Commando (1987)
- Phantom Soldiers (1987)
- Black Cobra 2 (1988)
- Zombi 3 (1988)
- Dog Tags (1990)
- Mondo Cannibale (2003)
- The Tomb (2004)

== Quotes ==
- "He can turn an ordinary soft drink straw into a weapon." (Fireback)
- "Recruit more pimps, more pushers." (Blood Debts)
