= List of treasure hunt films =

This is a list of notable films whose main subject is treasure hunting.

== 0 - 9 ==
- 9 Souls (Nain Souruzu, 2003)

== A ==
- The A.R.K. Report – Secret for the Century (2013)
- The Adventurer: The Curse of the Midas Box (2013)
- The Adventurers (1951)
- The Adventurers (Авантюристы, 2014)
- The Adventurers (2017)
- The Adventures of Tintin (2011)
- Aguirre, the Wrath of God (1972)
- Aladdin and the King of Thieves (1995)
- All the Brothers Were Valiant (1923)
- All the Brothers Were Valiant (1953)
- Allan Quatermain
  - Allan Quatermain and the Lost City of Gold (1986)
  - Allan Quatermain and the Temple of Skulls (2008)
- Anacondas: The Hunt for the Blood Orchid (2004)
- Animal Treasure Island (1971)
- The Ark of the Sun God (Sopravvissuti della città morta; 1984)

== B ==
- Bait (1954)
- Barroz (2022)
- Between God, the Devil and a Winchester (Anche nel west c'era una volta Dio, 1968)
- Beat the Devil (1953)
- Below the Sea (1933)
- Beyond the Poseidon Adventure (1979)
- Black Mor's Island (L'île de Black Mór, 2004)
- Black Sea (2014)
- Blue (2009)
- Blueberry (Blueberry : L'expérience secrète, 2004)
- Boy (2010)
- Boy on a Dolphin (1957)
- Burning Sands (Brennender Sand, 1960)

== C ==
- Captain Calamity (1936)
- Carbon (2018)
- Carib Gold (1956)
- Ces dames préfèrent le mambo (1957)
- Charade (1963)
- City Beneath the Sea (1953)
- City Slickers II: The Legend of Curly's Gold (1994)
- Coast of Skeletons (1965)
- Congo (1995)
- The Count of Monte Cristo (2002)
- Crosswinds (1951)
- Cutthroat Island (1995)

== D ==
- Da 5 Bloods (2020)
- The Da Vinci Code (2006)
- The Da Vinci Treasure (2006)
- The Dagger of Kamui (Kamui no Ken, 1984)
- The Deep (1977)
- Do or Die (1921)
- Doraemon: Nobita's Treasure Island (Doraemon Nobita no Takarajima, 2018)

== E ==
- Easy Come, Easy Go (1967)
- The Emerald of Artatama (La muchacha del Nilo, 1969)
- Enemy Gold (1993)
- The Evil Below (1989)

== F ==
- Fear Is the Key (1972)
- Federal Agents vs. Underworld, Inc (1949)
- Felix and the Treasure of Morgäa (Félix et le trésor de Morgäa, 2021)
- The Fighting Skipper (1923)
- Firewalker (1986)
- Flight to Fury (1964)
- Franco, Ciccio e il pirata Barbanera (1969)
- Fool's Gold (2008)
- Forbidden Island (1959)
- Fountain of Youth (2025)

== G ==
- Gandu Bherunda
- Ghost Diver
- The Glass Sphinx
- Go West! A Lucky Luke Adventure
- Gold (2016)
- Gold Diggers: The Secret of Bear Mountain
- The Good, the Bad and the Ugly
- The Good, the Bad, the Weird
- The Goonies
- The Grave (1996)
- Grave Robbers
- Green Hell
- Guru Sishyan (1988)

== H ==
- Haunted Island
- Hell's Island
- The Hessen Affair
- The Hobbit: An Unexpected Journey
- The Hobbit: The Desolation of Smaug
- Hollywood.Con
- Hunters of the Golden Cobra
- Hurricane Smith (1952)

== I ==
- In the Shadow of the Cobra (2004)
- Impasse (1969)
- Indiana Jones
  - Raiders of the Lost Ark (1981)
  - The Temple of Doom (1984)
  - The Last Crusade (1989)
  - Kingdom of the Crystal Skull (2008)
  - Indiana Jones and the Dial of Destiny (2023)
- Insaf Ki Pukar (1987)
- Into the Blue (2005)
  - Into the Blue 2: The Reef (2009)
- Isle of Forgotten Sins (1943)

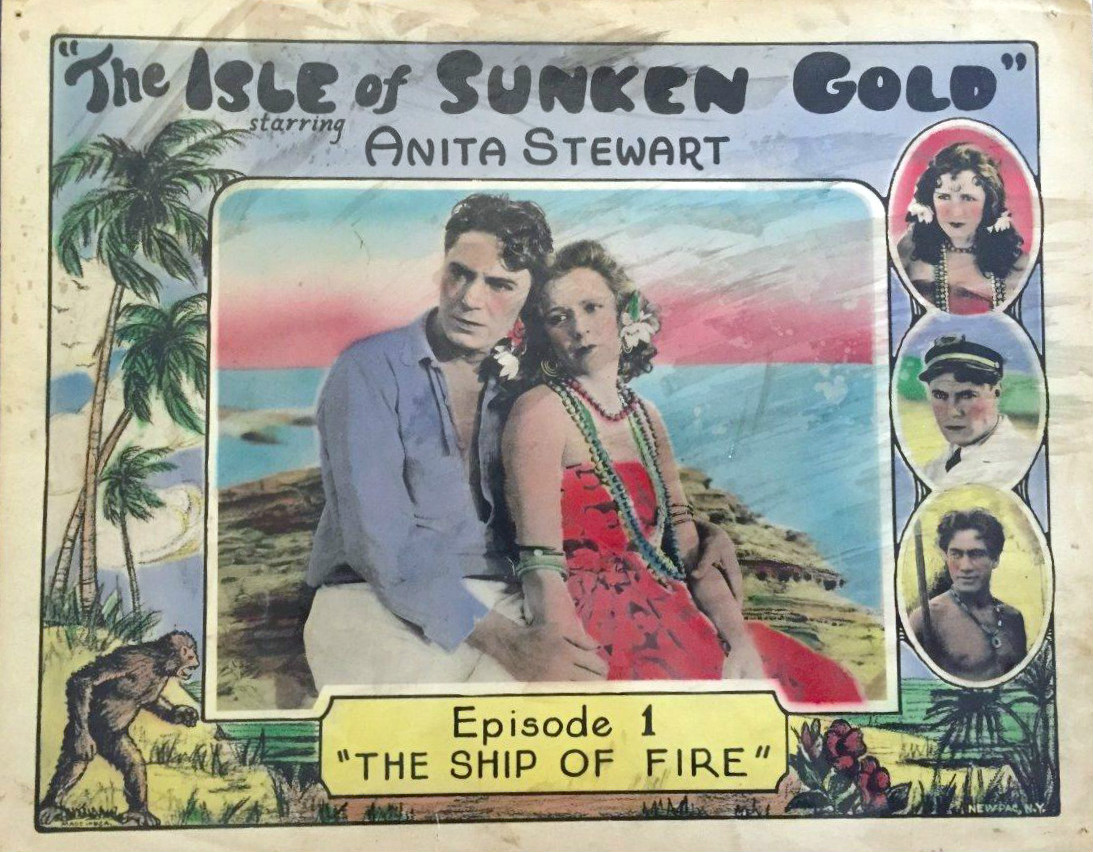
Isle of Sunken Gold (1927)

- Isle of Sunken Gold (1927)
- It's a Mad, Mad, Mad, Mad World (1963)

== J ==
- The Jack of Diamonds
- Jawker Dhan
- Jay Vejay
- Jungle Cruise
- Jungle Raiders (1985)

== K ==
- Karthikeya 2 (2022)
- Khazana (1987)
- King of California (2007)
- King Solomon's Mines (1937)
- King Solomon's Mines (1950)
- King Solomon's Mines (1985)
- King Solomon's Mines (2004)
- King Solomon's Treasure (1979)
- Kodama Simham (1990)
- Kolkatay Kohinoor (2019)
- Krampus Unleashed (2016)
- Kumiko, the Treasure Hunter (2014)
- Kung Fu Yoga (功夫瑜伽, 2017)

== L ==
- Labou (2008)
- Lara Croft
  - Lara Croft: Tomb Raider (2001)
  - Lara Croft: Tomb Raider – The Cradle of Life (2003)
  - Tomb Raider (2018)
- The Last Adventure (Les Aventuriers; 1967)
- The Legend Hunters (鬼吹灯之天星术, 2025)
- The Librarian
  - The Librarian: Quest for the Spear (2004)
  - The Librarian: Return to King Solomon's Mines (2006)
  - The Librarian: Curse of the Judas Chalice (2008)
- Long John Silver (1954)
- Long Live Your Death (Viva la muerte... tua!, 1971)
- The Lost City (2022)
- Lost Treasure (2003)
- The Lost Treasure of the Knights Templar (Tempelriddernes skat, 2006)
- Lupin III: The First (Rupan Sansei Za Fāsuto, 2019)
- Lust for Gold (1949)

== M ==
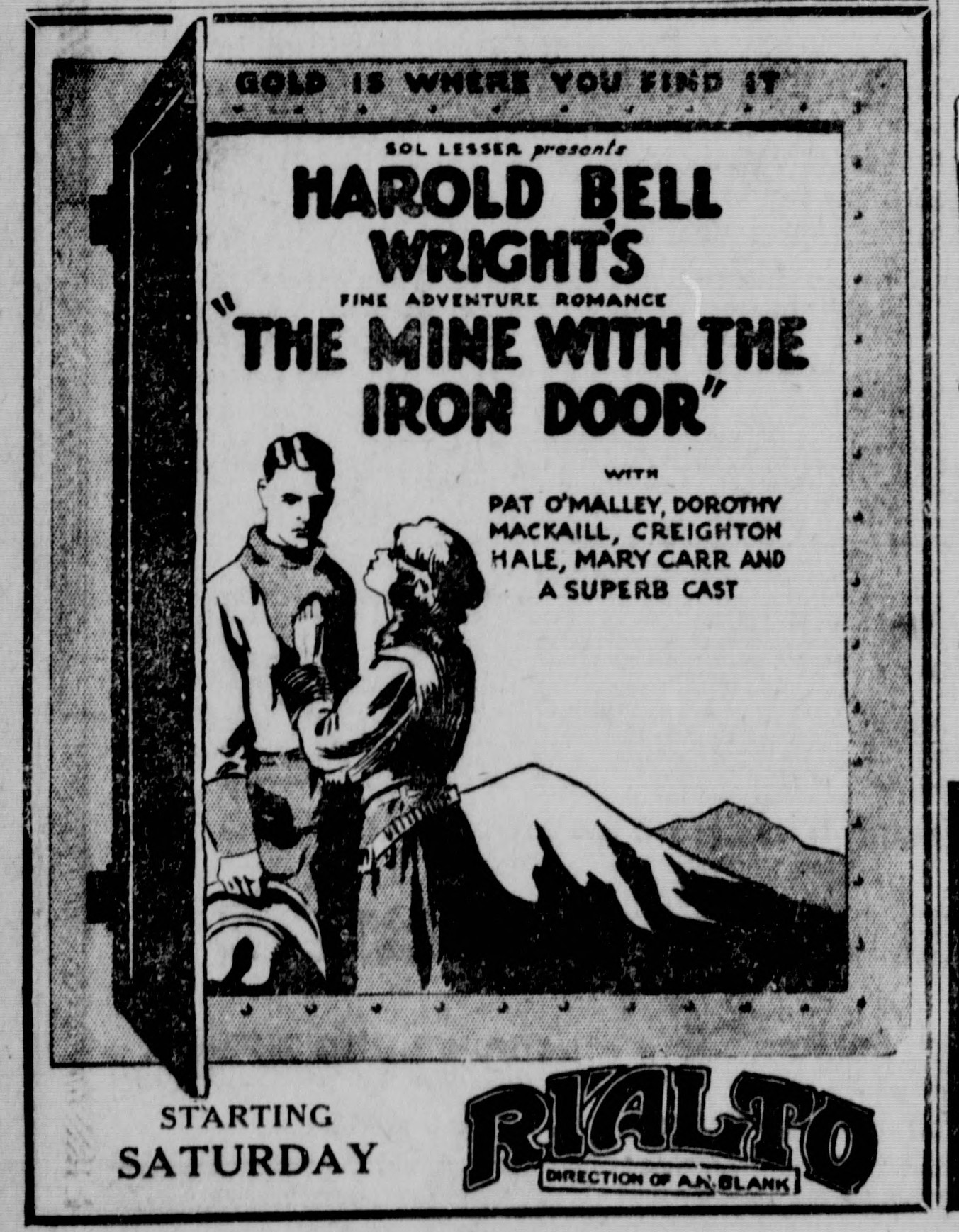
The Mine with the Iron Door (1924, contemporary advertisement)

- Mackenna's Gold
- The Maltese Falcon (1941)
- Manfish
- Manina, the Girl in the Bikini
- Mara Maru
- The Mask of Sheba
- Midnight Crossing
- Midnight Madness (1980)
- Million Dollar Mystery
- The Mine with the Iron Door (1924)
- The Mine with the Iron Door (1936)
- Monty Python and the Holy Grail (1975)
- The Mummy (1999)
- Muppet Treasure Island (1996)
- Mystery Mansion (1983)

== N ==
- Naksha
- National Treasure (franchise)
  - National Treasure
  - National Treasure: Book of Secrets (2007)
- No Gold for a Dead Diver
- Northeast of Seoul

== O ==
- O Brother, Where Art Thou? (2000)
- Oasis of the Zombies (L'Abîme des Morts-Vivants; La tumba de los muertos vivientes / The Abyss of the Living Dead, 1982)
- On the Reeperbahn at Half Past Midnight (Auf der Reeperbahn nachts um halb eins, 1954)
- One Piece (2000)
- One Piece: Giant Mecha Soldier of Karakuri Castle (2006)
- One Piece: Stampede (2019)
- Outlaw Trail: The Treasure of Butch Cassidy (2006)

== P ==
- Paradise for Sailors
- The Pearls of the Crown
- The Pink Jungle
- Pirate Treasure
- Pirates of the Caribbean: The Curse of the Black Pearl
- Pirates of the Caribbean: Dead Man's Chest
- Pirates of the Caribbean: Dead Men Tell No Tales
- Pirates of the Caribbean: On Stranger Tides
- Pirates of Treasure Island
- The Pirates: The Last Royal Treasure
- Plunder (serial)
- Plunder of the Sun
- The Prisoner of Château d'If
- Pudhaiyal
- Puss in Boots: The Last Wish

== Q ==
- Quick, Let's Get Married

== R ==
- Race for the Yankee Zephyr
- Raiders of the Lost Ark
- Rat Race
- The Real Macaw
- Return to Treasure Island
- Revelation (2001)
- Riders of the Whistling Skull
- Rio das Mortes
- Road to Utopia
- Romancing the Stone (1984)
  - The Jewel of the Nile (1985)
- Rommel's Treasure
- Royal Treasure
- The Ruffian
- The Ruthless Four

== S ==
- Sahara (2005)
- Sahasam (2013)
- Saint Petersburg
- Sam Whiskey
- Satan's Sister
- Scalawag
- Scavenger Hunt
- The Sea God
- Secret of the Andes
- Secret of the Sphinx
- The Secret of Treasure Island (1938)
- September Storm
- The Seventh Coin
- The Shadow of Chikara
- The Shark Hunter
- Shark!
- Sharks' Treasure
- Sinbad of the Seven Seas
- Sinbad the Sailor (1947)
- Slither (1973)
- Smuggler's Island
- Snowbound (1948)
- South of Algiers
- Spellcaster
- A Splendid Hazard
- St Trinian's 2: The Legend of Fritton's Gold
- The Stranger and the Gunfighter
- Street of Darkness
- The Syndicate (1968)

== T ==
- Takkari Donga
- Tex and the Lord of the Deep
- That Man from Rio
- Three Kings (1999)
- The Tiger's Trail
- Tom and Jerry: Shiver Me Whiskers
- Tom and Jerry: The Fast and the Furry
- Towers of Silence
- Transformers: Revenge of the Fallen
- Transformers: The Last Knight
- Treasure Buddies
- Treasure Island (1918)
- Treasure Island (1920)
- Treasure Island (1934)
- Treasure Island (1938)
- Treasure Island (1950)
- Treasure Island (1972)
- Treasure Island (1973)
- Treasure Island (1982)
- Treasure Island (1986)
- Treasure Island (1988)
- Treasure Island (1990)
- Treasure Island (1995)
- Treasure Island (1999)
- The Treasure of Bird Island
- The Treasure of Jamaica Reef
- The Treasure of Lost Canyon
- Treasure of Matecumbe
- The Treasure of Monte Cristo
- Treasure of the Four Crowns

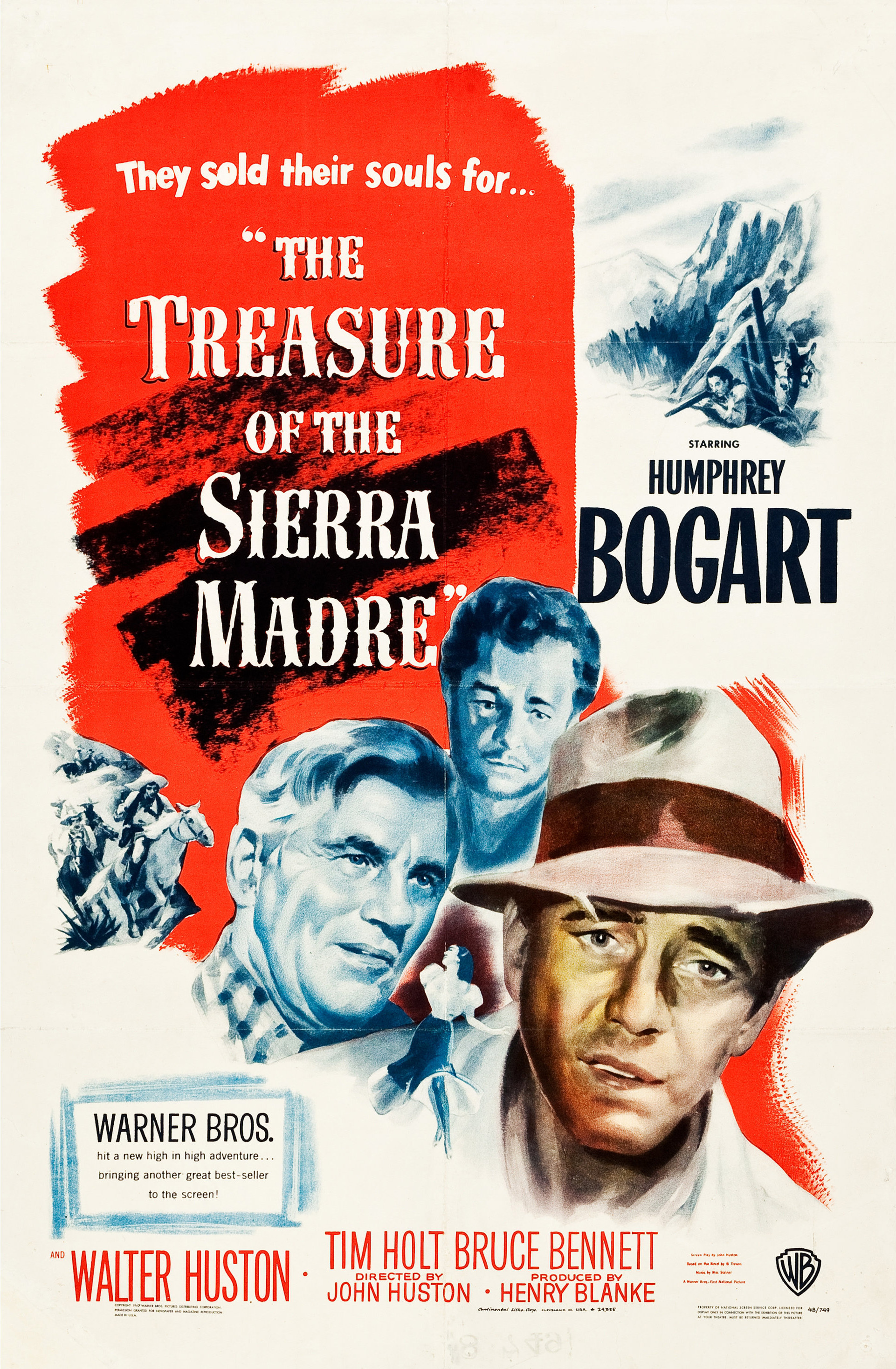
The Treasure of the Sierra Madre, 1948

- The Treasure of the Sierra Madre
- Treasure Planet (2002)
- The Treasure Planet (Планетата на съкровищата, Planetata na sakrovishtata, 1982)
- Treasure Raiders
- The Treasure Seekers (1979)
- Trespass (1992)
- The Truth About Spring

== U ==
- Unbelievable Adventures of Italians in Russia
- Uncharted (2022)
- Underwater!

== W ==
- Wake of the Red Witch
- The Walking Hills
- Wanda Nevada
- The Way to the Gold
- Weekend at Bernie's II
- Wet Gold
- White Fire
- White Gold (2003)
- Wings Over Africa
- Without a Paddle
- Wizards of Waverly Place: The Movie

== Y ==
- The Yellow Mountain

== Z ==
- Zalzala (1988)
