= Romano Kristoff =

Spanish actor, writer and director

Romano Kristoff (born Francisco Xavier Garcia Peña, 1951)is a Spanish actor, writer and director, better known for his work in Filipino cinema. He worked mostly in the Philippines between the 1980s and early 1990s. He was also credited as Rom Kristoff, Ron Kristoff, Run Kristoff, Ron Krastoff, and other similar variants.

Very little info on him can be about Kristoff anywhere, except that he was Spanish by birth, a martial artist (apparently holding a black belt in karate), ex-Foreign Legionnaire and had some legitimate training as an actor.

== Biography ==
He appeared mostly in low-budget action and martial arts films such as Jungle Rats (1987), and Black Fire (1985), during the 80's, often directed by Teddy Page and John Gale (director). The vast majority of Kristoff's films were produced by K.Y. Lim's Silver Star Film Company (also called Kinavesa in the Philippines), a prolific, if somewhat notorious producer of Filipino action films. The Silver Star films usually recycled the same cast of American and European Z-movie workhorses from one film to another. Some of the recurring faces were Mike Monty, James Gaines, Mike Cohen, Gwendolyn Hung, Frank Juhas and Ronnie Patterson, and Kristoff acted with all of them. He became something of a star for Silver Star, appearing in several leading roles throughout the 80's, most prominently in Slash (1984), a film influenced by the Rambo films of Sylvester Stallone to the point of plagiarism. In 1981 Kristoff was cast as a supporting player in the Richard Harrison vehicle Intrusion Cambodia, directed by John Gale. The two became friends and Kristoff was later invited to Italy by Harrison to co-write and act in the 1986 film Three Men on Fire, which Harrison directed and starred in. Three Men On Fire was Kristoff's only film shot outside the Philippines. Kristoff also co-wrote the script to Ninja's Force (1985) with Ken Watanabe (not to be confused with the more famous Ken Watanabe), another member of the Silver Star entourage. Don Gordon Bell was another of the ex-pat actors, one of Romano's best friends appearing in several of the films made by Kinevesa Films/Silver Star Films.

He also appeared in some Italian productions made in the Philippines, such as the Vietnam War action film Tornado: The Last Blood (1983), directed by Antonio Margheriti and starring Giancarlo Prete and Antonio Marsina. Other Italian films he acted in were The Last Hunter, (1980), also directed by Margheriti, and Ferdinando Baldi films Warbus (1985), Ten Zan: The Ultimate Mission (1988), and Just A Damn Soldier (1988).

When the Filipino film industry dwindled at the turn of the 90's, so did the careers of many expatriate actors working in the Philippines. Kristoff, like Monty, Gaines and others, faded to obscurity as the 90's progressed. Outside the Philippines, he could possibly have had a more successful career in action and martial arts films.

Romano Kristoff is unofficially retired as he hasn't has a role in a film since 2000. Kristoff's most recent notable role was a small part in the Italian-Filipino Brigitte Nielsen actioner Doomsdayer (2000), directed by Michael J. Sarna and also starring former TV Tarzan actor Joe Lara and Udo Kier. According to an interview of Nick Nicholson on the French B-movie site Nanarland, Kristoff is currently managing a restaurant in the Philippines.

In addition to his movie work, Kristoff has written several books.
