= Ten Zan: The Ultimate Mission =

- US DVD cover
- Directed by: Ferdinando Baldi (as Ted Kaplan)
- Written by: Ferdinando Baldi
- Produced by: Scino Glam; Massimo Vigliar
- Starring: Frank Zagarino; Mark Gregory; Romano Kristoff; Sabrina Siani
- Cinematography: Marcello Masciocchi
- Edited by: Med Salkin
- Music by: Elio Polizzi
- Distributed by: Surf Film
- Release date: 1988
- Running time: 84 min.
- Countries: Italy; North Korea
- Language: English

Ten Zan: The Ultimate Mission (also known as Missione Finale) is a 1988 science fiction action film written and directed by Ferdinando Baldi under the pseudonym "Ted Kaplan". The film stars Frank Zagarino, Mark Gregory, Romano Kristoff, and Sabrina Siani. It was Baldi's final film before his death in 2007.

The film, an international co-production between Italy and North Korea, was filmed on-location in the latter country. To date, it is one of the few Western-produced non-documentary features to be shot in the country, and one of the only films made there to feature American actors. The film portrays North Korea as a futuristic utopia, a decision which Baldi later explained as "a conscious avoidance of reality" foisted upon the production by the local regime.

Ten Zan was one of eight North Korean films to be shown at the Udine Festival of Far East Film in 2000. In a report of these screenings for Asiaweek, Richard James Havis regarded the film as "truly lamentable", saying: "The acting is worse than that of the propaganda movies, as is the plot."

== Plot ==
A group of known troublemakers are working on experiments in the Far East. They have discovered a substance that penetrates human cells, and makes changes to chromosomes and genes. These experiments are carried out on young girls who are abducted from the local villages. They are brought to the "Center", which is heavily guarded by mercenaries. The leader of the scientists is an avid biologist, Professor Larson, who dreams of breeding a master race to rule the world. The scientific organizations in Asia and Europe are aware of these experiments and decide to do something about them. A group of ex-commando fighters are used, who have never failed so far. But it remains to be seen if this mission is to succeed.

== Cast and characters ==
- Lou Mamet (Frank Zagarino): a mercenary-for-hire, from Mattituck, Long Island, he is contracted through FSR (Final Solution Research), an organization that contracts commandos to deals with problem too delicate to be handled through official government channels.
- Jason (Mark Gregory): the military leader of the mercenaries responsible for the attacks and kidnappings.
- Ricky (Romano Kristoff): a middle-man for FSR, he is hired by Professor Larson to commission the FSR to end the illegal trafficking of woman, which in turn hires Lou Mamet. Credited as Rom Kristoff.
- Mavi (Kim Follet): the younger sister of Ricky, and love interest for Mamet.
- Glenda (Sabrina Siani): assistant and lover of Jason. Credited as Sabrina Syan.
- Professor Larson (Charles Borromel): Lithuanian professor of the University of Vilna, who works to breed a master race. (Note: According to a 2020 interview with Romano Kristoff, the role of Larson was played by Charles Robert Jenkins, a U.S. defector to North Korea, but this is not corroborated by other sources, which credit the role to Charles Borromel, a British actor who appeared in many Italian films.)

== Production ==
Ten Zan was produced as an attempt to revitalize the North Korean film industry, which was then struggling to find markets even in other communist countries. It was decided to produce an action film which could look Western enough to circumvent the embargo on North Korean products and turn out a profit on international markets. The North Koreans went to the Cannes Film Market where they approached Italian director Ferdinando Baldi, who was promoting his latest film, Warbus, and proposed him the project. Baldi was surprised at the idea of shooting a film in North Korea but was curious enough about the experience to accept. He initially wrote a script about the Pacific War, hence the title, Ten Zan, which is a reference to the last Japanese stronghold on Iwo Jima, which was called Devil's Peak by the American soldiers trying to capture the island during the Battle of Iwo Jima. However, the script was completely rewritten by the North Koreans.

The film was co-produced by North Korea and by an Italian company called Amerinda. Filming took place in North Korea and lasted eight weeks. North Korean authorities frequently interfered with filming, forbidding Baldi to use certain locations. The North Koreans were initially very reluctant to have an American, Frank Zagarino, play the lead role.

The film includes a major plot hole in that the character of Professor Larson, who hires the two protagonists at the beginning, turns out at the end to be the head of the antagonists' organization, meaning that he sent the heroes to destroy his own operation. Baldi later conceded in an interview that this did not make sense, but blamed the inconsistency on "a problem of production" as he was not allowed to see the rushes during filming. Baldi speculated that the script had been somehow changed during production without him being informed.

Zagarino liked to take photos, which caused an incident during filming as the North Koreans suspected him of being a spy. Baldi later said that Zagarino had then been arrested and jailed for two days. However, Zagarino himself downplayed the incident in an interview and said that the North Koreans merely confiscated his camera. Zagarino called the film "a huge disaster", as filming in North Korea had been particularly difficult and the North Koreans "never gave us what they promised".

== Release ==
After organizing a screening in Italy for the North Koreans, Baldi had no further contact with them. Due to a falling out between the Italian co-producers and the North Koreans, the film was never released in Italy. It was only released internationally on home video.
