= Tornado: The Last Blood =

- Italian theatrical release poster
- Directed by: Antonio Margheriti
- Screenplay by: Tito Carpi
- Story by: Gianfranco Couyoumdjian
- Starring: Giancarlo Prete; Luciano Pigozzi
- Cinematography: Sandro Mancori
- Edited by: Marcello Malvestito
- Music by: Aldo Tamborrelli
- Production company: Gico Cinematografica
- Release dates: September 3, 1983 (Bologna, Italy)
- Running time: 96 minutes
- Country: Italy
- Language: English

Last Blood, also known as Tornado: The Last Blood is a 1983 Italian Euro war action film directed by Antonio Margheriti and starring Giancarlo Prete.

== Plot ==
The Vietnam War is drawing to a close, but an elite unit of Green Berets, led by the stubborn and ruthless Captain Harlow, continues to be deployed on missions bordering on suicide. All of this is done solely to satisfy Harlow’s own false sense of prestige and ambition, with no military justification whatsoever. Without ever hiding his disapproval from his commander, Sergeant Sal Maggio does everything he can to protect his men during these suicide missions.

The losses in terms of human lives, however, are still very high. Annoyed by the rebellious sergeant’s complaints, Captain Harlow takes advantage of a favorable opportunity during one of his missions to abandon him on the battlefield along with a wounded soldier. Despite everything, Sal manages to return safely to base camp, bringing his wounded comrade with him. This event earns him the affection and respect of all the soldiers, but also the wrath of Harlow, who, between new suicide missions and further harassment, never stops provoking him.

After a soldier commits suicide, Maggio, driven to the brink, strikes his captain in front of other soldiers who witness the incident. For this behavior, he is court-martialed. While being transported to prison, however, the convoy he is traveling in is attacked by the Viet Cong, and, taking advantage of the confusion, Sal manages to break free and escape into the Cambodian jungle. At this point, a ruthless manhunt begins. Hidden deep in the jungle, Sal finds himself fighting alone against everyone—both the Viet Cong enemies and the American soldiers tasked with capturing him.

== Cast ==
- Giancarlo Prete as Sgt. Sal Maggio (as Timothy Brent)
- Antonio Marsina as Captain Harlow
- Luciano Pigozzi as Freeman (as Alan Collins)
- Sherman 'Big Train' Bergman as Green Beret (uncredited)
- David Brass as Tom, Wounded Soldier (uncredited)
- Michael James as US Corporal (uncredited)
- Romano Kristoff as Helicopter Pilot (uncredited)
- David Light as US Soldier (uncredited)
- Edoardo Margheriti as US Soldier (uncredited)
- Mike Monty as Captain Bolen (uncredited)
- Ronnie Patterson as MP Sgt. Pike (uncredited)

== Release ==
Tornado was released in Bologna, Italy on September 3, 1983.

The film was released on a US VHS as Tornado in the 1980s by Lightning Video and on German DVD and Blu-Ray as Im Wendekreis des Söldners in the 2010s by Ascot Elite Home Entertainment.

== See also ==
- List of Italian films of 1983
- Euro War
- War film
