= Code Name: Wild Geese =

1984 film

- German film poster art by Tom Chantrell
- Directed by: Antonio Margheriti
- Screenplay by: Michael Lester
- Produced by: Erwin C. Dietrich
- Starring: Lewis Collins; Lee Van Cleef; Ernest Borgnine; Klaus Kinski; Mimsy Farmer
- Cinematography: Peter Baumgartner
- Music by: Eloy
- Production companies: Ascot Film; Gico Cinematografica
- Release date: 5 October 1984 (West Germany)
- Running time: 101 minutes
- Countries: West Germany; Italy
- Language: Italian

Code Name: Wild Geese (Italian: Arcobaleno selvaggio, German: Geheimcode: Wildgänse) is a 1984 West German-Italian Euro War film directed by Antonio Margheriti and starring Lewis Collins in the first of their three mercenary war films. Despite the film's title, Code Name: Wild Geese is not the sequel to The Wild Geese film, but a derivative film. Kim Newman described the film as closer to the director's films such as The Last Hunter and Cannibal Apocalypse.

== Plot ==
In Hong Kong, DEA man Fletcher (Borgnine) heads an operation to cut off the supply of opium to the west; to fund this operation Fletcher has found himself allied with wealthy American businessman Brenner.

Brenner and his partner, ex-mercenary Charlton, employ Robin Wesley, a father who's still grieving over his dead heroin addict son, to destroy opium factories in the Golden Triangle. Wesley's team consists of other mercenaries from around the world, some of whom have been on the wrong side of the law (China and Klein).

As the team enters the Golden Triangle by boat, Fletcher, Brenner and Charlton remain in Hong Kong, waiting on every piece of news transmitted from their base. After travelling a distance down river, the team disembark for a march through the jungle, where they meet up with Kim and his guerrilla fighters. Kim and his men guide Wesley's team through the jungle to a remote base located in a quarry. One of Kim's men and Klein each eliminate a sentry in a watch tower. As Wesley, China, Klein, Stone and Kim and his men prepare to descend the steep incline into the quarry, Arbib and Kowalski rig a rope slide across the top of the quarry. First Kowalski slides over the communications hut before dropping through the bamboo roof, killing one soldier and capturing the other, even though he's been impaled through his upper left arm by a foot long piece of bamboo. Then Arbib drops into the sleeping quarters hut, where he's forced to kill all the occupants, who are awakened and try to attack him. The rest of the commandos descend the steep quarry sides and shoot any enemy that escape from Kowalski and Arbib, except for China, who secures the base's lone helicopter and readies it for flight. With the base secured, Kim removes the bamboo splinter from Kowalski's arm and bandages it while Wesley uses the base's radio to inform his own base that they have captured the helicopter intact. Leaving Kowalski with two of Kim's men to guard the base and its radio, the rest join China aboard the helicopter, which takes off and heads deeper into the triangle.

While Brenner and Charlton are enjoying a round of golf, Fletcher interrupts them to let them know that Wesley has neutralized the quarry base and captured the helicopter. As China pilots the helicopter towards the opium manufacturing depot, the depot radios the quarry to see if the radar contact they have is the quarry's helicopter. The lone survivor at the quarry, under the watchful eye and gun of Kowalski, confirms that it is and is just on a routine trip. Satisfied, the depot allows the helicopter to land and the commandos come out shooting, killing all the enemy soldiers who stray into their sight. As Wesley, Arbib and Stone destroy the heroin laboratories with C4, Klein blows up the opium container silos with grenades and C4. While the destruction is going on, Stone is unfortunately wounded and Klein and China race to help him; Kim and his men locate prisoners and free them. All return to their homes except for a North American woman who behaves in a bizarre manner. China intervenes when he misjudges Kim to be attacking the woman, only for Arbib to point out that the woman is a heroin addict with puncture marks on her forearm. Wesley enters an office and rifles through a safe; finding a computer disk, he loads it on a nearby computer and browses its contents.

== Cast ==
- Lewis Collins as Captain Robin Wesley
- Lee Van Cleef as China
- Ernest Borgnine as Fletcher
- Klaus Kinski as Charlton
- Mimsy Farmer as Kathy Robson
- Manfred Lehmann as Klein
- Thomas Danneberg as Arbib
- Frank Glaubrecht as Stone
- Hartmut Neugebauer as Brenner
- Wolfgang Pampel as Baldwin
- Luciano Pigozzi as Priest
- Bruce Baron as Kowalski

== Soundtrack ==
The score of the film was composed by Jan Němec and performed by Eloy.

== Release ==
The film was released in West Germany on 5 October 1984. The film was released in America in September of 1986 and grossed $600,000 at the US/Canadian box - office.

== Reception ==
In a contemporary review, Kim Newman (Monthly Film Bulletin) noted that certain elements such as the surprise villain in the film were obvious while the action scenes mainly consist of Asian stunt men leaping out of explosions.
