= Giorgio Serrallonga =

Italian film editor

Giorgio Serrallonga is an Italian film editor.

Serrallonga edited For a Few Dollars More along Eugenio Alabiso, by Sergio Leone, Car Crash (1981) and The Stranger and the Gunfighter (1974) by Anthony M. Dawson, and Un bambino di nome Gesù along Domenico Varone.

== Filmography ==
- Ci sarà un giorno (Il giovane Pertini) (1993)
- Un niño llamado Jesús (1987)
- Quo Vadis? (1985)
- Yor, the Hunter from the Future (1983)
- Carrera salvaje (1981)
- Hay un fantasma en mi cama (1981)
- Cannibals in the Streets (1980)
- Vacaciones al desnudo (1979)
- Fantasma en el Oeste (1978)
- Il Passatore (1977-1978)
- La otra mitad del cielo (1977)
- Blood Money (1974)
- Turn the Other Cheek (1974)
- Seven Dead in the Cat's Eye (1973)
- Maschi e femmine (1972)
- Eneide (1971)
- A Lizard in a Woman's Skin (1971)
- Youth March (1969)
- Capriccio all'italiana (1968)
- Las aventuras de Ulises (1968)
- Aquí robamos todos (1968)
- Arrastão (1967)
- The Witches (1967)
- A Rose for Everyone (1967)
- Make Love, Not War (1966)
- For a Few Dollars More (1965)
- Los complejos (1965)
- The Dolls (1965)
- Countersex (1964)
- Tres noches de amor (1964)
- High Infidelity (1964)
- Battle of the Worlds (1961)
- A Sailor's Promises (1958)

== Bibliography ==
- Chiti, Roberto; Poppi, Roberto (2000). Dizionario del cinema italiano. Gremese Editore. p. 352. ISBN 9788877424235.
