= Commando Leopard =

1985 film

- Film poster
- Directed by: Antonio Margheriti
- Screenplay by: Roy Nelson
- Story by: Giacomo Furia
- Produced by: Erwin C. Dietrich
- Starring: Lewis Collins; Klaus Kinski; Manfred Lehmann
- Cinematography: Peter Baumgartner
- Edited by: Alberto Moriani; Marie Luise Buschke
- Music by: Goran Kuzminac; Ennio Morricone
- Production companies: Ascot Filmproduktion GmbH; Prestige Film S.r.l.
- Release dates: 24 October 1985 (West Germany); 20 April 1986 (Italy)
- Running time: 103 minutes
- Countries: West Germany; Italy

Commando Leopard (German: Kommando Leopard) is a 1985 Euro War film directed by Antonio Margheriti and starring Lewis Collins, Klaus Kinski, and Manfred Lehmann.

== Plot ==
In an unnamed Latin American dictatorship, a group of rebel freedom fighters fight to bring about a less oppressive society. The rebels, led by the enigmatic Enrique Carrasco (Collins) who has returned to his native land to fight, attack a hydro-electric dam. Along with Carrasco's native fighters are Smithy (Steiner), a British mercenary, and Maria, a native ex-medical student turned freedom fighter. After killing the security guards, Carrasco's men place explosives at a crucial point in the dam wall; when they detonate, the resulting tidal surge destroys a nearby bridge that is carrying a government convoy.

On hearing the news, the President demands the head of the secret police, Colonel Silvera (Kinski), to eliminate the rebels. Carrasco's group arrive at an impoverished village to gain medical supplies for their wounded, unfortunately the village leader informs Carrasco that there is none, but there are nearby priests that looks after the sick and wounded. Splitting his force in two, Maria leads a group including the wounded to seek out the priests while Carrasco, Smithy and the rest of the group return to the dam. After leaving the village Government forces led by Silvera's deputy (Leutenegger) attacks the village with flame thrower armed helicopters. At the site of the destroyed dam, Carrasco finds that the Government forces have already built a pontoon bridge and are recovering the sunken supply convoy. Using scuba diving equipment, Carrasco and Smithy plant time bombs on some of the still submerged trucks that carried explosives. But before the two rebels can exit the river the bombs explode, the pressure wave knocks Smithy unconscious and he surfaces and is captured. Carrasco is more fortunate and escapes with the help of an elderly friend (Pigozzi) and his men, who turn up in a truck in the nick of time.

In a prison located in the country's capital, Smithy is being held with other political prisoners when he learns of a plot to free them.

== Cast ==
- Lewis Collins as "Leopard" Carrasco
- Klaus Kinski as Silveira
- Manfred Lehmann as Don Julio
- John Steiner as Anrade
- Hans Leutenegger as Leutnant Ortiz
- Thomas Danneberg as José
- Francis Derosa as Hidalgo
- Alan C. Walker as Emiliano

== Production ==
Commando Leopard was made from many returning cast and film crew members of Code Name: Wild Geese: director Antonio Margheriti, producer Erwin C. Dietrich, cinematographer Peter Baumgartner, Lewis Collins, Klaus Kinski, Manfred Lehmann, Thomas Danneberg and Luciano Pigozzi.

== Reception ==
In a contemporary review, Kim Newman of The Monthly Film Bulletin noted the special effects in the film, stating that the set-pieces "are quite impressively managed through the use of near-perfect miniatures" while stating that "everything else is very lazily slung together". Newman described Lewis Collins acting as "uninvolved" and that only Klaus Kinski as "at least having a presence...he refuses to give any kind of performance".
