= Cannibal Apocalypse =

- Italian theatrical release poster
- Italian: Apocalypse domani
- Directed by: Antonio Margheriti
- Screenplay by: Dardano Sacchetti
- Produced by: Edmondo Amati; Maurizo Amati; Sandro Amati
- Starring: John Saxon; Elizabeth Turner; Giovanni Lombardo Radice; Cinzia De Carolis; Tony King; Wallace Wilkinson; Ramiro Oliveros
- Cinematography: Fernando Arribas
- Edited by: Giorgio Serrallonga
- Music by: Alexander Blonksteiner
- Production companies: New Fida; Jose Frade P.C.
- Distributed by: Eurocopfilms (Italy); J.F. Films de Distribución (Spain)
- Release dates: 21 August 1980 (Padua & Florence)
- Running time: 96 minutes
- Countries: Italy; Spain

Cannibal Apocalypse (Italian: Apocalypse domani, lit. 'Apocalypse tomorrow', also known as Invasion of the Flesh Hunters) is a 1980 horror film directed by Antonio Margheriti (as 'Anthony M. Dawson') and starring John Saxon, Elizabeth Turner, Giovanni Lombardo Radice, Cinzia De Carolis, Tony King and Ramiro Oliveros. The film combines the cannibal film genre with a Vietnam War film.

== Plot ==
During the Vietnam War, U.S. Army Captain Norman Hopper leads a rescue mission of American POWs. Two of the prisoners, Charlie Bukowski and Tommy Thompson, have resorted to cannibalism after months of starvation. When Hopper rescues them, the prisoners bites him.

In present-day Atlanta, Bukowski is released from a mental hospital. He calls Hopper by phone, inviting his old comrade out for a drink. The call comes in at an inopportune moment, as a young neighbor girl named Mary is trying to seduce him, so he turns down the invitation. Hopper falls for her charms, and he bites her. He gets into his car. Mary reveals that she enjoyed the bite.

Meanwhile, an armed Bukowski barricades himself inside a flea market, killing a security guard and a biker in the process. Hopper convinces Bukowski to surrender to the police, but in the process, Bukowski bites an officer. In custody, Bukowski is reunited with Thompson.

Hopper instructs his wife, Jane, to wait for him in the house and walks in front of Mary's window. He admits to the incident and his wish to bite a fellow human to his wife. Bukowski and Thompson fight the guards, and Bukowski bites nurse Helen's leg. Dr. Phil Mendez calls Jane and tells her that Hopper might be experiencing the same symptoms and that she should bring him to the hospital for a checkup. He listens to the conversation, then leaves the house.

The police get the coroner's report on the mall shootout, and it contains warnings of cannibalism. Jane meets Dr. Mendez, who has been trying to seduce her before. They are at a fancy piano bar, and speculate that the veterans are suffering from an epigenetic craving for human flesh brought about by extreme PTSD, which has mutated into a virus that is transferred via bite. Hopper voluntarily goes to the hospital and talks to a doctor about his symptoms and his well-founded suspicions about Dr. Mendez's intentions with his wife. The doctor also takes a blood sample.

Meanwhile, the bitten police officer and Nurse Helen both suddenly develop cannibalistic urges and kill their colleagues. Helen frees Bukowski and Thompson, and Hopper kills a staff member who tries to notify the authorities.

Hopper and Bukowski leave the hospital in an ambulance. When the phone rings, Jane returns to an empty house and searches for Hopper. Dr. Mendez notifies her that Hopper has disappeared. The police are on high alert and looking for the escapees. The escapees break into a tire shop and find a gun. Bukowski uses an angle grinder to slice up a victim. Thompson steals a station wagon and leaves the infected with a pistol and a bag of snacks.

They get confronted by the biker gang that Bukowski previously fought at the flea market. They run away on foot and escape into the sewer just as the police arrive on the scene. The police coordinate a blockade of the sewer exits to trap the suspects. Jane cannot make a telephone call and goes next door to ask Mary's aunt to use the phone. Mary and her brother greet her and let her use the phone to call Dr. Mendez, but the aunt is nowhere to be seen. The children behaved suspiciously and asked her why her phone was not working, but they let her leave.

Helen gets attacked by a rat just as the cannibals are about to slip away from the police. She ends up being shot along with a cop. The police kill Bukowski while Hopper is wounded. Thompson goes berserk and is killed with a flamethrower. Hopper crawls out of the sewer and leaves the scene.

Jane tries to leave the house in her car but cannot start it. She hears strange noises and calls for Hopper. She finds him in his dress uniform. Hopper is hurt and dying, and Dr. Mendez walks into the house. Jane runs over to him, but he bites her as Hopper shoots him. Jane points his gun at her head, and two shots are heard just as the police arrive on the scene.

The infected children watch as the bodies are being hauled away. The boy asks Mary if they will be looking for their aunt. Her hand is seen inside the fridge.

== Cast ==
- John Saxon as Norman Hopper
- Elizabeth Turner as Jane Hopper
- Giovanni Lombardo Radice as Charlie Bukowski
- Cinzia De Carolis as Mary
- Tony King as Tommy Thompson
- Wallace Wilkinson as Captain McCoy
- Ramiro Oliveros as Dr. Phil Mendez
- May Heatherly as Nurse Helen
- Renzo Marignano as Dr. Morris
- Venantino Venantini as Lt. Hill
- Walter Patriarca as Mr. Philipps
- Jere Beery as Biker Leader
- Luca Venantini as Bobby
- Joan Riordan as Tina
- Don Ruffin as Carlos
- Goffredo Unger as Mall Guard
- Laura Dean as Brunette Jogger

== Production ==
Filming took place on-location in Atlanta and Decatur, Georgia. Locations included the Savannah College of Art and Design, CNN Center, and the Candler Discount Mall. Interiors were filmed at De Paolis Studios in Rome. Giannetto De Rossi was the special makeup effects designer. The opening Vietnam War sequence re-used props and costumes from Antonio Margheriti's previous film, The Last Hunter.

Actor John Saxon had gotten a badly translated script, in which the gory parts were left out. In a 2002 interview Saxon explained: "It was talking about the Vietnam war like it was a virus you could bring home. I thought it was a great metaphor for a psychological condition." Saxon only learned what the movie was truly about during shooting.

"At one point we were shooting a scene and a guy brings in this tray of meat. I asked what it was for and they explained to me it was supposed to be body parts, even genitals, and we were supposed to gnaw on them. I asked Margheriti to take me out of the scene and I went to my hotel room. Once I found out what the true nature of the film was I got so depressed." Saxon contemplated leaving the production altogether.

== Release ==
Cannibal Apocalypse was released theatrically in August 21, 1980 in Padua and Florence, Italy.

=== Home media ===
The film was released on DVD by Image Entertainment as part of the Euroshock Collection on March 19, 2002. On Blu-ray, Kino Lorber Studio Classics released a high-definition, brand new 4K master version on March 17, 2020.

== Critical reception ==
Patricia MacCormack of Senses of Cinema critiqued, "Although the film has been maligned by critics, who claim Margheriti disinherited his adeptness at the gothic by meddling in the vulgar genre of high-gore, the sympathies he evokes for perversion as at turns tragic pathology and strange alternative desire, the disdain with which he represents hyperreal examples of ‘normal’ male sexuality and the extraordinary versions of human flesh he presents for our pleasure, a pleasure which compels us into a world of perversion and desire beyond the palatable, are all continued thematically if not stylistically in this film. Margheriti's use of Radice and gore brings him from the gothic worlds of Bava and Freda into a subgenre more often associated with Fulci, Umberto Lenzi and Deodato, yet he remains faithful to his perverse paradigms."

Danny Shipka, author of Perverse Titillation, a book on exploitation films from Italy, Spain and France, noted that the films premise was both "interesting" and "silly" and that the film "contains enough blood and gore to make Eurocult fans happy, including some graphic flesh munching, a French-kissing scene that will scare the hell out of you, and a shotgun blast that has to be seen to be believed." Online film database AllMovie stated that the film will "never be confused for high art but Cannibal Apocalypse offers plenty of bizarre low-budget thrills for the Eurotrash aficionados," and that the highlight of the film was John Saxon, noting that "no matter how bizarre or sleazy the premise becomes, Saxon plays the material straight and delivers a serious, well-crafted performance that makes it possible to stick with the film's strange premise."

LA Weekly and The Spinning Image list this movie as belonging to the vetsploitation subgenre.

== See also ==
- Deathdream (1974)
