= Tony King (actor) =

American actor

- Born: May 6, 1947 (age 79); Canton, Ohio, U.S.
- Occupation: Actor
- Years active: 1971-present

Tony Emanuel King (born May 6, 1947) is an American actor, political activist, and retired football player. A player for the Buffalo Bills for only one season in 1967, King subsequently became an actor and appeared in numerous exploitation and B movies, including several produced in Italy. In the 1980s, he became a member of the Nation of Islam, and changed his name to Malik Farrakhan. He served as the head of security for the hip-hop group Public Enemy.

== Filmography ==
Film
Year	Title	Role	Notes
1971	Shaft	Davies	
1972	The Godfather	Tony, Stablehand	Uncredited
1972	Hail	The People	
1972	The King of Marvin Gardens	Messenger #2	
1973	Gordon's War	Roy Green	
1973	Hell Up in Harlem	Zach	
1974	Super Spook	Sergeant Sandwich	
1975	Report to the Commissioner	Thomas "Stick" Henderson	
1975	Bucktown	T.J.	
1976	Sparkle	"Satin" Struthers	
1980	Cannibal Apocalypse	Tom Thompson	
1980	The Last Hunter	Sergeant George Washington	
1981	Sharky's Machine	"Kitten" Holmes	
1982	Tiger Joe	"Midnight" Washington	
1982	The Toy	Clifford	
1983	The Big Score	"Jumbo"	
1983	The Atlantis Interceptors	Mohammed / Washington	
1991	Daughters of the Dust	Newlywed Man	
1993	The November Men	Agent With Bag	
1995	Mirage	Nude Bar Tall Thug	
2013	Swing Lowe Sweet Chariote	"Sly"	
2014	The Long Road To The Hall of Fame:	Himself	Documentary

TV
Year	Title	Role	Notes
1975–1976	Bronk	Sergeant John Webber	25 episodes
