= The Atlantis Interceptors =

- Original Italian film poster
- Italian: I predatori di Atlantide
- Directed by: Ruggero Deodato
- Screenplay by: Vincenzo Mannino; Dardano Sacchetti
- Story by: Vincenzo Mannino; Dardano Sacchetti
- Starring: Christopher Connelly; Giola Scola; Tony King
- Cinematography: Roberto D'Ettorre Piazzoli
- Edited by: Vincenzo Tomassi
- Music by: Guido De Angelis; Maurizio De Angelis
- Production company: Regency Productions
- Distributed by: Indipendenti Regionali
- Release date: 1983
- Running time: 92 minutes
- Country: Italy
- Languages: English; Italian

The Atlantis Interceptors (Italian: I predatori di Atlantide, lit. 'Predators of Atlantis'; also released as Raiders of Atlantis) is a 1983 Italian science fiction action film directed by Ruggero Deodato and starring Christopher Connelly, Gioia Scola, Tony King, Ivan Rassimov, Bruce Baron and George Hilton.

== Plot summary ==
Two Vietnam veterans and a team of scientists trying to raise a sunken Russian submarine face a battle for survival against marauding Atlanteans.

== Cast ==
- Christopher Connelly as Mike Ross
- Giola Scola as Dr. Cathy Rollins
- Tony King as Mohammed / Washington
- Stefano Mingardo as Klaus Nemnez
- Ivan Rassimov as Bill Cook
- Giancarlo Prati as Frank
- Bruce Baron as Crystal Skull
- George Hilton as Professor Peter Saunders
- Mike Monty as George
- Michele Soavi as James
- Maurizio Fardo as Larry Stoddard
- Benedetta Fantoli as Barbara Stoddard
- Lewis E. Ciannelli as Oil Rig Commander
- John Vasallo as Manuel
- Gudrun Schmeissner as Liza
- Gwendolyn Hung as Mary
- Adriana Giuffrè

== Production ==
Filming took place on-location in the Philippines; Lazio, Italy and Miami, Florida. Giannetto De Rossi was the special makeup effects artist.

== Release ==
The Atlantis Interceptors was released in 1983.

== Reception ==
In a retrospective review, Donald Guarisco wrote for AllMovie that the film was a "good illustration of just how fun an exploitation quickie can be", not a plot that was described as "throwaway stuff", but that it "offers plentiful b-movie fun in practice because it puts an accent on action, and throws an endless array of endearingly goofy b-movie plot hooks at the viewer." Discussing the effects, Guarisco found them "cheap looking, particularly the miniature effects. . . but that's really part of the fun for the b-movie fans this is aimed at." and concluded that the film was a "b-movie with specialized appeal but Eurocult fans will likely find it to be a blast of kitschy fun."

== Footnotes ==
=== Sources ===
- Curti, Roberto (2019). Italian Gothic Horror Films, 1980-1989. McFarland. ISBN 978-1476672434.
- Guarisco, Donald. "Raiders of Atalantis (1983)". AllMovie. Archived from the original on April 4, 2019.
