= Car Crash (film) =

- Directed by: Antonio Margheriti
- Screenplay by: Massimo De Rita
- Story by: Marco Tullio Giordana
- Produced by: Giovanni Di Clemente
- Starring: Joey Travolta; Vittorio Mezzogiorno
- Cinematography: Hans Burman
- Edited by: Giorgio Serrallonga
- Music by: Mario Capuano; Giosy Capuano
- Production companies: Cleminternazionale Cinematografica; Scorpio Film; Hesperia Film
- Release dates: July 24, 1981 (Florence, Italy); August 31, 1981 (Spain)
- Running time: 95 minutes
- Countries: Italy; Spain; Mexico

Car Crash is a 1981 film directed by Antonio Margheriti and starring Joey Travolta, Vittorio Mezzogiorno and Ana Obregón.

== Plot ==
Paul the race car driver and Nick the mechanic win a fixed race and running afoul of local mafia leader Eli Wrosnky who tells them not to attend the Big Illegal race in Mexico called the imperial crash. So naturally Paul and Nick decide to visit their friend Paguito who has been working on a Pontiac firebird that was designed specifically for the imperial crash. Paguito is then shot dead. And so Paul and nick and Paul's ex-girlfriend Janice travel to Mexico city. The race begins. The mafia's hired driver Al Costa causes a crash that results in almost the whole field crashing and dying. Heading into the final lap the only drivers who are still alive are Paul and Al Costa. Paul runs Al's car off the road of the second to last turn. Paul wins on account of him being the only guy who is still alive and he, Nick, and Janice celebrate.

== Cast ==
- Joey Travolta as Paul Little
- Vittorio Mezzogiorno as Nick
- Ana Obregón as Janice
- John Steiner as Kirby
- Ricardo Palacios as Eli Wronsky
- Sal Borgese as Al Costa

== Development ==
Car Crash was directed by Antonio Margheriti and produced by the Italian company Cleminternazionale Cinematografica, the Mexico-based Scorpio Film, and the Spanish-based company Hesperia Film.

== Release and reception ==
Car Crash was distributed in Italy by Titanus and released in Florence on July 24, 1981. It was released on August 31, 1981 in Spain as Carrera salvaje.

It received generally unremarkable reviews in Italy from Paese Sera, Il Giorno, Corriere d'Informazione and Il Giornale.

== See also ==
- List of Italian films of 1981
