= Teddy Page =

Filipino film and television director

Teddy Chiu, professionally known as Teddy Page, is a Filipino film director and occasional writer. He began his career as a young man in the early 1980s, directing low-budget action movies for producer K.Y. Lim's Silver Star Film Company (known as Kinavesa in the Philippines).

== Career ==
Most of Page's movies starred a specific group of American and European expatriates working in the Philippines in the 1980s, including such actors as Mike Monty, Bruce Baron, and Romano Kristoff. In particular, former spaghetti Western and sword-and-sandal star Richard Harrison has starred in three of Page's movies: Fireback, Hunter's Crossing, and Blood Debts.

Many of his earlier efforts were written or co-written by Watanabe, Kristoff, Gaines or Harrison using a pseudonym. The majority of Page's films have been generally classified as Z-movies, characterized by loose, seemingly improvised narrative (Fireback, for example, is supposed to take place in the United States, but the setting suddenly changes to "The Jungle" for the last third of the film), bizarre plot twists, and comically bad acting accentuated by equally poor dubbing. Gratuitous, often sadistic violence is mixed with near childlike naivety, with characters having comic book names like "Panther" and "Cat Burglar". Another trademark of the earlier Page films were oversized, customized special weapons, which feature prominently in Fireback and Blood Debts.

The Silver Star productions are infamous for their extremely low budgets, which might have also contributed to the low technical quality. In the book Gods In Spandex, Richard Harrison states that the Page films he appeared in didn't have complete shooting scripts and many scenes were improvised, hence the disjointed narrative. However, it can be said that Page's early films are particularly bad, even on the admittedly low Silver Star standards, but they have attracted some cult interest, especially in French B-movie fandom.

There is very little information on Teddy Page in print or online. He is discussed briefly in pieces by Richard Harrison and John P. Dulaney in the books Gods in Polyester, Or, A Survivors' Account of 70's Cinema Obscura (2004) and Gods In Spandex, Or, A Survivors' Account of 80's Cinema Obscura (2007). He is also mentioned in passing in interviews of Bruce Baron, Nick Nicholson and Mike Monty at the French B-movie website Nanarland.

He is still working as a director on films and television in the Philippines, now using his real name (Teddy Chiu). His last directing credit is the 1999 action film Anino. He has also worked as a Second Unit Director or assistant director, most recently in the 2001 film Xtreme Warriors.

== Partial filmography ==
- Fireback (1983)
- Blood Debts (1985)
- Deadringer (1985) starring Max Thayer
- Phantom Soldiers (1987) starring Max Thayer
- Blood Hands (1990) statring Sean Donahue
- Fighting Spirit (1992) starring Loren Avedon
