= Libido (1965 film) =

Italian giallo film

- Directed by: Ernesto Gastaldi; Vittorio Salerno
- Screenplay by: Ernesto Gastaldi; Vittorio Salerno
- Story by: Mara Maryl
- Produced by: Karl Spiehs; Ernesto Gastaldi
- Starring: Dominique Boschero; Mara Maryl; John Charlie Johns; Alan Collins
- Cinematography: Romolo Garroni
- Edited by: George Money
- Music by: Carlo Rustichelli
- Production company: Nucleofilm
- Distributed by: Imperialcine
- Release date: 1965
- Running time: 90 minutes
- Country: Italy
- Language: Italian

Libido is a 1965 Italian giallo film written and directed by Ernesto Gastaldi and Vittorio Salerno, from a story by Gastaldi's wife Mara Maryl. It stars Giancarlo Giannini, Luciano Pigozzi, Mara Maryl, and Dominique Boschero.

== Plot ==
In a cliffside mansion, a young boy named Christian witnesses his sex maniac father murder his mistress in a room lined with mirrors. The father then kills himself by jumping off the cliff. Years later, the now adult Christian returns to inherit the family home with his fiancée Helene, his attorney Paul and Paul's wife Brigitte. Christian fears that his father may still be alive, and that he may inherit his father's insanity along with his house. The room of mirrors continues to haunt Christian in adulthood, reflecting and amplifying his own sexual obsessions. Strange events occur that lead Christian to believe his father may still be actually living in the house.

== Cast ==
- Giancarlo Giannini (credited as John Charlie Johns) as Christian Coreau
- Mara Maryl as Brigitte Benoit
- Dominique Boschero as Helene Coreau
- Luciano Pigozzi (credited as Alan Collins) as Paul Benoit

== Production ==
According to Gastaldi, Libido was filmed in only 18 days on a bet. He based the screenplay on a story idea conceived by his wife Mara Maryl, who also had a co-starring role in the film. Gastaldi reused some footage from this film in his later 1982 horror film Notturno con grida.

The film's plot borrowed from both Les Diaboliques and Roger Corman's The Pit and the Pendulum, according to critic Adrian Luther Smith, who continued: "Despite the inevitable constraints of the budget, "Libido" looks refreshingly sharp due to impressive B&W photography (by Romolo Garroni) and some great locations."
