= Kenneth Gilbert (actor) =

English actor (1931–2015)

- Gilbert as Richard Dunbar in The Seeds of Doom (1976)
- Born: 24 June 1931; Plymouth, Devon, England
- Died: 29 October 2015 (aged 84)
- Occupation: Actor

Kenneth Gilbert (24 June 1931 – 29 October 2015) was an English actor who appeared in many television and stage productions over a 50-year period. He often played authority figures such as doctors, colonels, detectives and police surgeons, but became best known as businessman Oliver Banks in the soap opera Crossroads.

== Early life ==
Gilbert served in the Royal Air Force's Naval Rescue Service and trained as an actor at the Corona Academy in Chiswick.

== Career ==
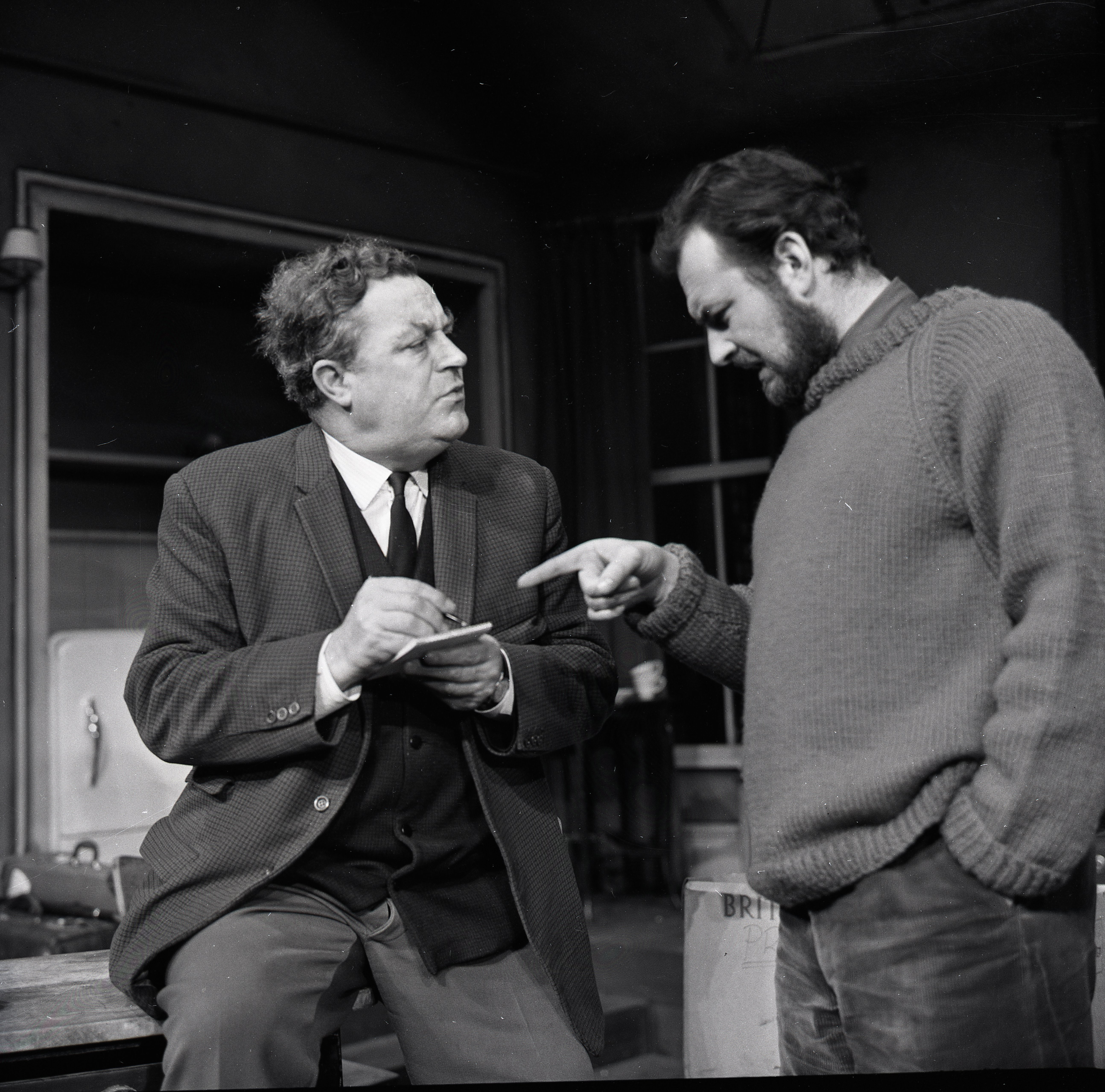
Kenneth Gilbert and John Barrie in 'As You Are' York Theatre Royal, 1967

Gilbert trained as a classical actor at the Shakespeare Memorial Theatre in Stratford-upon-Avon. He was subsequently a member of the Royal Shakespeare Company and appeared at The Old Vic. His television appearances included Doctor Who (as World Ecology Bureau official Richard Dunbar) in The Seeds of Doom (1976), House of Cards, Mister Corbett's Ghost (1987) and Softly, Softly.

== Filmography ==
Year	Title	Role	Notes
1961	Touch of Death	Mobile policeman	
1963	Tomorrow at Ten	Hospital Nurse	
1969	Wolfshead: The Legend of Robin Hood	Friar Tuck	
1971	Twins of Evil	Puritan	Uncredited
1986	God's Outlaw	Humphrey Monmouth	
1989	The Lady and the Highwayman	Lord Henry	
