= Hans Leutenegger =

Swiss bobsledder and actor (born 1940)

Olympic medal record

Bobsleigh
| Gold medal – first place | 1972 Sapporo | Four-man |

Hans Leutenegger (born January 16, 1940, in Bichelsee-Balterswil) is a Swiss bobsledder who competed in the early 1970s. He won the gold medal in the four-man event at the 1972 Winter Olympics in Sapporo.

== Life ==
Leutenegger was born 16 January 1940 in the hamlet Höfli near Bichelsee, the oldest of eight siblings, to Alois and Margrith Leutenegger. His parents were destitute and his father primarily worked as textile factory worker in the embroidery factory Traxler AG.

Leutenegger also founded his own construction firm in Switzerland in 1965, Hans Leutenegger AG, a business that continues as of 2012. The company has expanded into employment search and a temporary staffing for engineering positions. He also did some acting, working with Klaus Kinski in the 1985 film Kommando Leopard (Commando Leopard).
