= Thomas Danneberg =

German actor (1942–2023)

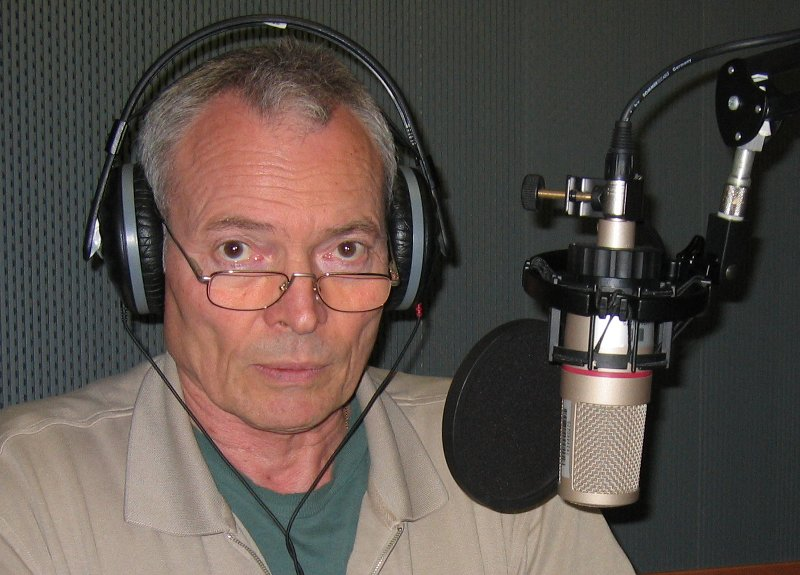
Danneberg in 2010

Thomas Danneberg (2 June 1942 – 30 September 2023) was a German actor. He is best known as Charles Emerson in the 1967 Edgar Wallace film The Blue Hand and for dubbing over the actors Arnold Schwarzenegger, Terence Hill, Sylvester Stallone, John Cleese, Dan Aykroyd, Adriano Celentano, Nick Nolte, John Travolta, Michael York, Rutger Hauer and Dennis Quaid.

Danneberg also collaborated with the German trance/techno-band E Nomine on a number of their albums.

Thomas Danneberg retired from voice acting because of health reasons. He died from a stroke on 30 September 2023, at the age of 81.

== Filmography ==
=== Films ===
- Codename: Wildgeese – 1985 – Habib
- Commando Leopard – 1986 – Jose
- The Commander – 1988 – "Crazy Bo" Gustafsson

=== Television animation ===
- A Sitch in Time (Rufus 3000)

=== Original video animation ===
- Mickey's Twice Upon a Christmas (Blitzen)

=== Theatrical animation ===
- Big Hero 6 (Heathcliff)
- Brother Bear (Tuke)
- Chicken Little (Hollywood Chicken Little)
- Igor (Dr. Glickenstein)
- Shark Tale (Luca)
- Shrek 2 (King Harold)
- Shrek Forever After (King Harold)
- Shrek the Third (King Harold)
- The Fox and the Hound (Adult Tod)
- The Wild (Benny)

=== Video games ===
- Ankh (Annoying Palace Guard, Mummy, Souvenir Dealer)
- Jack Keane (Montgomery)

=== Dubbing roles (live action) ===
- Dan Aykroyd
- John Cleese
- Terence Hill
- Dennis Quaid
- Arnold Schwarzenegger
- Sylvester Stallone
- John Travolta
- Die Hard with a Vengeance (John McClane)
- The Fall Guy (Howie Munson)
- Highlander (The Kurgan)
- Hulk (David Banner)
- Mother, Jugs & Speed (Murdoch)

== Audiobooks ==
- 2007: John Katzenbach: Die Anstalt, The Madman's Tale (together with Simon Jäger), publisher: Argon Verlag, ISBN 978-3866102743
