= Lewis Collins =

English actor (1946–2013)

- Collins as Bodie in The Professionals
- Born: 27 May 1946; Bidston, Cheshire, England
- Died: 27 November 2013 (aged 67); Los Angeles, California, U.S.
- Resting place: Green Hills Memorial Park
- Education: London Academy of Music and Dramatic Art
- Occupation: Actor
- Years active: 1971–2002
- Known for: Bodie in The Professionals, Captain Peter Skellern in Who Dares Wins and Philip Mark in Robin of Sherwood
- Spouse: Michelle Larrett (m. 1992)
- Children: 3

Lewis Collins (27 May 1946 – 27 November 2013) was an English actor, best known for his career-defining role playing 'Bodie' in the late 1970s/early 1980s British television series The Professionals.

== Early life ==
Collins was born in Bidston, Birkenhead, on the Wirral Peninsula in Cheshire. At the age of two, he won 'The Most Beautiful Baby in Liverpool' contest. He was educated at Gautby Road Primary School and Grange Secondary School in Birkenhead.

When he was 13 years of age, his father Bill, a jazz dance band leader, bought him a drum kit. His first gig was playing with his father's band, and he also joined a group of older school pupils to form a band named the Renegades at the start of the Merseybeat music scene in Liverpool in the late 1950s. His passion for firearms began in his youth from a membership of the Liverpool Central Rifle Club. On leaving school, he took an apprentice hairdresser's position at the Andre Bernard Salon, alongside fellow apprentice Mike McCartney (stage name Mike McGear; later a member of the comedy, music and poetry trio The Scaffold). In the same period Collins was writing songs with Mike McCartney, and when the drummer Pete Best was dropped from the Beatles, Mike McCartney suggested Collins as a possible replacement to his elder brother Paul McCartney. Turning down the option of an audition with the Beatles, Collins continued playing music on an amateur basis for a number of local bands, including the Eyes, and the Georgians.

In late 1964, Collins gave up hairdressing to become the bass player with the Mojos, of which his father was the roadie. Collins performed on their charting singles "Goodbye Dolly Gray" and "Until My Baby Comes Home", and moved from Liverpool to London with them when the band appeared to have good commercial prospects. However, the band failed to have any further commercial success, so they disbanded. Finding himself in the midst of cosmopolitan London in 1966 during the Swinging Sixties, Collins earned a living engaged in temping work in the roles of delivery van driving, cleaning windows and as a waiter before deciding that he wanted to become an actor after hearing a play being performed on the radio.

Having been accepted for training in acting by the London Academy of Music and Dramatic Art (LAMDA), which he attended from 1968 to 1971, he drew the notice of his fellow students for an "electrifying" performance in the lead role of Shakespeare's Romeo and Juliet.

== Theatre career ==
Upon his graduation from LAMDA, Collins in 1971 joined the Chesterfield Civic Theatre's repertory company, moving to the company of the Citizens Theatre in Glasgow in 1972 under the director Giles Havergal. While in Glasgow he also taught deaf and mute children mobility skills, learning British sign language so he could communicate with them, later saying that this was the most satisfying work that he had done in his life. He appeared in seven plays in Glasgow in 1972, including the lead in Christopher Marlowe's Tamburlaine the Great. He then went with Havergal on an acting teaching tour with the Prospect Theatre Company in the United States and Canada, before returning to the British Isles to appear in London's West End, starring in City Sugar and The Threepenny Opera, and at the Royal Court Theatre in the play The Farm in 1973, directed by Lindsay Anderson.

After moving into film acting in the mid-1970s, he intermittently returned to the stage throughout his career. He performed in a pantomime of Babes in the Wood at the King's Theatre in Southsea at Christmas in 1983. In the mid-1990s he performed in an English provincial tour of the play Who killed Agatha Christie by Tudor Gates. His last performance in theatre was a 1999–2000 provincial tour in the English Midlands of J.B. Priestley's Dangerous Corner.

== Move into television ==
Whilst appearing in The Farm at the Royal Court in 1973, Collins received an offer for his first television role in the BBC police drama Z-Cars. His first major television role was in Granada Television's comedy series The Cuckoo Waltz from 1975 to 1977, in the role of Gavin Rumsey, alongside his landlord (played by David Roper) and landlady (played by Diane Keen). By the mid-1970s he was regularly appearing on British television dramas in various roles.

== The Professionals (1977–1983) ==
In 1976, the dramatist and television producer Brian Clemens created a new British television crime-action drama series titled The Professionals, modelled on the success of the hit American television series Starsky and Hutch. It was also intended to be a more realistic follow-up to his previous television series about government agents, The New Avengers, in which Collins had appeared.

As with the previous series, Clemens planned to have a split leads casting arrangement for the new show. He had already cast the actor Martin Shaw; however, Clemens found in the first week of filming that the initial partnership he had arranged for the recording of the pilot episode with his other first choice of actor, Anthony Andrews, was not working out. The producers quickly found that the duo lacked personal on-screen chemistry due to the similarity of the acting styles of Andrews and Shaw; therefore a decision was made to recast Andrews' role with another actor. He then thought of Collins as an alternative after seeing a recently filmed episode of The New Avengers, in which Collins and Shaw (who each had trained at LAMDA) had appeared alongside one another; there had been a noticeable dynamic tension between them, both in their acting style and off-screen private personalities. After a screen test of Collins, he replaced Andrews as 'William Bodie'. Although the two actors personally did not get on particularly well together, the good-humoured antagonism and bravado between Collins and Shaw on-screen worked well and the series was highly successful on British television for the next six years, making household names of them both. The production came to an end in 1981, although new episodes continued to be shown onscreen until early 1983.

== Military career ==
Collins was a private in the 10th Battalion Parachute Regiment of the British Army (a Territorial Army unit) from 1979 to 1983. In 1983, he passed entrance testing to join the Territorial SAS, but was rejected because of his celebrity status. From 15 to 23 March 1980, Collins and several volunteers from the Parachute Regiment, along with the boxer John Conteh, took part in a loaded march in military service conditions from London to Liverpool up the A41 road, the funds raised from the event being donated to a charity for disabled children.

== Acting career (1980s–1990s) ==
In the 1980s Collins auditioned for Eon Productions, the producers of the James Bond cinema franchise, to succeed Roger Moore in the role of 007, but the audition with its producer Albert R. Broccoli did not go well and he was rejected as being "too aggressive". Collins in retrospect regarded this failure as the key missed opportunity of his acting career. In 1982 he moved into cinema starring in the role of a British Army officer confronting terrorists in the film Who Dares Wins. According to Filmink the movie "made money locally; it might’ve done more and launched Lewis Collins as the action star that he should have been, had it not been so sloppily written."

As the 1980s progressed, Collins attempted to maintain a cinematic career. An initial plan to continue to make feature films with the Who Dares Wins producer Euan Lloyd, including one set in the Falklands War provisionally titled Task Force South, came to nothing, so he instead signed a German-Italian co-production contract to star in three mercenary war genre feature films directed by Antonio Margheriti set in the Third World, viz., Code Name: Wild Geese (1984), Kommando Leopard (1985), and Der Commander (1988), which attempted to capitalise on the recent box-office hits of The Wild Geese and The Dogs of War. They were commercially unsuccessful; as a result he returned to working in British television productions.

In 1986 he played the French medieval warlord Philip Marc in the series Robin of Sherwood. In 1988 he played Sergeant George Godley, second lead to Michael Caine in the British television film Jack the Ripper, which had a television audience of over 14 million.

At the start of the 1990s, he appeared in the role of "Colonel Mustard" in the British television drama/gameshow Cluedo (1991–92); however, acting roles became sparser for him as the decade progressed. In the early 1990s, seeking to extend his career options in drama to work beyond acting he attended courses in screenwriting and direction at the UCLA School of Theater, Film and Television in Los Angeles, California, but this led to no subsequent professional employment. In the mid-1990s he moved his family to Los Angeles – where he had been residing part-time – while he returned to England intermittently for the occasional provincial theatre tour and minor acting roles in television productions.

In March 1997, Collins announced in an interview on British television that he was in discussions with a production company to star in a new series based on The Professionals, reprising his career signature role of William Bodie as the CI5 Agency's Chief in the part played by Gordon Jackson in the original series. However, after months of negotiations it was announced by the producer David Wickes that Collins had been dropped as a casting option for the role for undisclosed reasons, and it had been given to the actor Edward Woodward instead. The new show, titled CI5:The New Professionals, went on to be a commercial and critical failure, and only ran for one series.

Collins' final acting performance was in an episode of the British television police drama series The Bill, titled "034", in 2002.

== Final years ==
In 2003, Collins left Britain and abandoned acting, and later in life had a business in the United States, selling computer equipment.

In early 2012, his return to acting was announced by his theatrical agent issuing a statement that he had been cast to play the role of the Earl Godwin in the historically based feature film production 1066, but in June 2013, it was announced by the same source that he had withdrawn from the production due to ill health.

== Death ==
After being first diagnosed in 2008, Collins died in Los Angeles at the age of 67, from cancer, on 27 November 2013. Shortly before his death, he returned to visit the United Kingdom, spending some time in Merseyside.

Collins' body was cremated. An urn holding his ashes is deposited in a memorial display cabinet at the North Pacifica Mausoleum section of Green Hills Memorial Park in Rancho Palos Verdes, California.

== Personal life ==
Collins married Michelle Larrett, a school-teacher, in 1992, the couple had three sons.

He held a private pilot's licence, a black belt in jujitsu and had trained in karate. His hobbies included parachuting, motorbikes, collecting firearms, sports shooting and playing musical instruments.

== TV roles ==
- Z-Cars, episode "Waste", 1974 – as Derek Cunningham
- Marked Personal, episodes "1.38" and "1.37", 1974 – as Len Thomas
- Village Hall, episode "Friendly Encounter", 1974 – Jimmy Jackson
- Crown Court, episode "Arson", 1974 – as PC Henry Williams
- Warship, episode "Away Seaboat's Crew", 1974 – L/Sea. Steele
- The Cuckoo Waltz, Granada TV sitcom, 1975–1977 – as Gavin Ramsey
- The New Avengers, Series 2 – episode 5 "Obsession", (with Martin Shaw), 7 October 1977 – as Kilner
- The Professionals, 1977–1983 – as Bodie
- Must Wear Tights (TV musical), 1978 - as Lewis Blake
- This Is Your Life, 1 episode, 1982 – as himself
- A Night on the Town, 1983 – as George, a photographer
- Robin of Sherwood, episode "The Sheriff of Nottingham", 1986 – as Phillip Mark
- Carly's Web, 1987 – as Alexander Prescott
- Jack the Ripper, TV Drama, 1988 – as Sergeant George Godley
- Alfred Hitchcock Presents, episode "The Man Who Knew Too Little", 1989 – as Bill Stewart
- Blaues Blut, TV series, 1990 – as Hugh Sinclair (segment "Bounty")
- A Ghost in Monte Carlo, TV Drama, 1990 – as Lord Drayton
- Cluedo, 7 episodes, 1991–1992 – as Jack Peacock in Series 2; as Col. Mustard in Series 3
- Tarzán, 2 episodes, 1993–1994 – as Michael Hauser
- The Grimleys, 2 episodes, 1999 – as Digby's Dad
- The Bill, episode 034, 2002 – Dr. Peter Allen (final appearance)

== Film roles ==
- Confessions of a Driving Instructor (1976) – (Extra as No.10 in the red- shirted rugby team)
- Who Dares Wins (1982) – Captain Peter Skellen
- Code Name: Wild Geese (1984) – Capt. Robin Wesley
- Commando Leopard (1985) – Enrique Carrasco
- The Commander (1988) – Maj. Jack Colby
