= Bruce Baron =

American actor (1949–2013)

- Born: November 15, 1949; New York City, U.S.
- Died: April 13, 2013 (aged 63); Hawaii, U.S.
- Education: Cornell University (1971)
- Occupation: Actor

Bruce Baron (November 15, 1949 – April 13, 2013) was an American actor.

Born in New York City, he graduated from Cornell University (B.A. 1971). He starred in several Asian movies, playing over a dozen lead roles in Hong Kong and Manila productions, including among others, in Godfrey Ho's "Ninja" features and Filipino low-budget action films for producer K.Y. Lim, such as Fireback, directed by Teddy Page.

Baron also appeared as the villain in Ruggero Deodato's sci-fi actioner The Atlantis Interceptors (1983), in Code Name: Wild Geese (1984), directed by Antonio Margheriti starring Lee Van Cleef, Ernest Borgnine and Klaus Kinski, and in Overdose (1987), by French softcore/exploitation director Jean-Marie Pallardy. Including Cantonese films, altogether he played in over 40 movies, as well as appearing in over 100 television commercials filmed in Asia for local, regional and international distribution, including a bit part in an episode of Dallas shot in Hong Kong. His last film was Guy Lee Thys' Belgian docudrama "Cruel Horizon" 1989 in which he played the lead role.

Bruce Baron died from cancer in April 2013.

== Filmography (selective) ==
=== Feature films ===
- Dangerous Encounters of the First Kind (1980) as Bruce
- Chak wong ji wong (1982)
- Dragon Force (1982) as Jack Sargeant
- Fireback (1983) as Duffy Colins
- The Atlantis Interceptors (1983) as Crystal Skull
- Mad Dog II (1983) as Frank
- Hunter's Crossing (1983) as Al
- Code Name: Wild Geese (1984) as Kowalski
- Heroes for Hire (1984) as McPearson
- Heated Vengeance (1985) as Jacobs

=== Television ===
- Dallas
  Episode: Shattered Dreams (1985)
