= David Warbeck =

New Zealand Actor (1941–1997)

- Warbeck in an episode of UFO (1970)
- Born: David Mitchell; 17 November 1941; Christchurch, New Zealand
- Died: 23 July 1997 (aged 55); London, England
- Education: Royal Academy of Dramatic Art
- Occupations: Actor, model
- Years active: 1968–1997
- Spouse: Lois Mitchell (m. 1965)
- Children: 1

David Warbeck (born David Mitchell; 17 November 1941 – 23 July 1997) was a New Zealand actor and model, best known for his roles in European exploitation and horror films.

A native of Christchurch, Warbeck became involved in local theatre there, which led to him receiving a scholarship to attend the Royal Academy of Dramatic Art in London in 1965. After attending for four terms, Warbeck dropped out and began working as a model. He made his feature film debut in John Hough's Wolfshead: The Legend of Robin Hood (1969), reuniting with the director again for 1971's Twins of Evil. Throughout the 1970s, Warbeck appeared in numerous international exploitation films, including A Fistful of Dynamite (1971) and Black Snake (1974), which established him as a niche action film star.

In 1981, Warbeck starred in two films for Italian horror director Lucio Fulci: The Black Cat and The Beyond. He went on to appear in several independent and exploitation films throughout the 1980s and 1990s before dying of cancer in London in July 1997, aged 55.

== Early life ==
Warbeck was born David Mitchell on 17 November 1941 in Christchurch, New Zealand. He was of Scottish descent. Warbeck attended school in Christchurch and Invercargill. After graduating, Warbeck began training to become an arts teacher. Through this, he became involved with local theatre productions, and performed with a small touring company in New Zealand. While performing in local theatre, Warbeck was awarded a scholarship from the New Zealand Arts Council to attend the Royal Academy of Dramatic Art in London.

== Career ==
=== Early work ===
Warbeck arrived in Britain in 1965 to attend the Royal Academy of Dramatic Art, and attended four terms before dropping out and becoming a photographic model. He made his film debut as the title character in Wolfshead: The Legend of Robin Hood (1969), a low-budget film adaptation of the adventures of Robin Hood directed by John Hough. He then appeared in an episode of UFO called "Destruction" in 1970.

Warbeck next landed a small but important role in Sergio Leone's A Fistful of Dynamite (1971). This would be his first foray into Italian cinema, which he would make his home within a few years. He reunited with director Hough appearing in the vampire film Twins of Evil (1971), followed by a minor role in Freddie Francis's exploitation film Craze (1974). Warbeck was then cast in American filmmaker Russ Meyer's cult film Black Snake (1973), in which he portrayed a man in the 1800s searching for his brother on a Caribbean island overseen by a vicious woman who owns a slave plantation. He also had the lead role in the British sex comedy The Sex Thief (1973), which was directed by a young Martin Campbell.

=== Italian films ===
Warbeck is perhaps best known for his violent horror film roles in the 1980s. One of the most noted of these is Lucio Fulci's The Beyond (1981), in which he portrayed a doctor who helps a woman uncover the mystery behind a Louisiana hotel she has inherited. The same year, he was cast in a supporting part as a police inspector in Fulci's The Black Cat (1981), based on the story by Edgar Allan Poe.

Warbeck's most common work during the 1980s was with director Antonio Margheriti. The exploitation film director produced a series of films which played on the success of mainstream releases such as Raiders of the Lost Ark and The Deer Hunter. Margheriti was best known for his action films, and some of his noted efforts featuring Warbeck were the Vietnam War film The Last Hunter (1980), Hunters of the Golden Cobra (1982) and The Ark of the Sun God (1983). The film was partly filmed and produced in Turkey.

=== Later work ===
Thanks to his appearances in several high-profile action and horror films, Warbeck was being seriously considered as the next James Bond, but the role was taken by Roger Moore. Warbeck claimed that for many years he was paid an amount to be a substitute or back-up Bond on the conditions that he not tell anyone and that he be ready for filming at a moment's notice in the case of Moore leaving or threatening to leave the role. One day he read about Timothy Dalton being chosen and was told by the producers that he was now "too old for the role".

Apart from a brief role as an ill-fated agent in the Tom Selleck film Lassiter (1984), Warbeck's later career consisted of several low-budget films including Ratman (1988), Mean Tricks (1992) directed by Umberto Lenzi, Pervirella (1997), Sudden Fury (1997), and Jake West's British vampire film Razor Blade Smile (1998). He also concentrated on fan conventions in the UK and U.S., where he was popular due to his work with Fulci.

== Personal life ==
Warbeck spent his later life living in Hampstead, London, with his wife Lois, whom he married in 1965. The couple had one daughter. He spent two decades restoring his residence there, which had been built by Sir George Gilbert Scott at the time of the construction of St Pancras Station.

== Death ==
In 1997, three weeks before his death, Warbeck recorded an audio commentary for the LaserDisc release of The Beyond with actress Catriona MacColl. At age 55, Warbeck died of an unspecified form of cancer in London, England on 23 July 1997.

== Filmography ==
=== Film ===
Year	Title	Role	Notes	Ref.
1969	Wolfshead: The Legend of Robin Hood	Robert of Locksley		
1970	My Lover, My Son	Kenworthy		
1970	Trog	Alan Davis		
1971	Journey to Murder	Chris (Do Me a Favor and Kill Me)		
1971	Twins of Evil	Anton Hoffer		
1971	A Fistful of Dynamite	Nolan, John's Friend		
1973	Black Snake	Sir Charles Walker / Ronald Sopwith		
1974	The Sex Thief	Grant Henry		
1974	Craze	Detective Wilson		
1975	Cry, Onion!	Villain With Sunglasses	Uncredited	
1976	A Common Sense of Modesty	L'amante di Lady Chatterley		
1980	The Last Hunter	Henry		
1981	The Black Cat	Inspector Gorley		
1981	The Beyond	Dr. John McCabe		
1982	Tiger Joe	Joe "Tiger Joe"		
1982	Hunters of the Golden Cobra	Bob Jackson		
1982	Panic	Captain Kirk		
1984	Lassiter	Muller		
1984	The Ark of the Sun God	Rick Spear		
1985	Miami Golem	Craig Milford		
1985	Formula for a Murder	Craig		
1988	Ratman	Fred Williams		
1988	Domino	Blind		
1990	Il ragazzo delle mani d'acciaio	John Foster	English title: Karate Rock	
1991	Arizona Road	FBI Agent		
1992	Mean Tricks	Frank Mendoza		
1993	Attrazione pericolosa	Lanfranco De Molinis		
1993	Breakfast with Dracula	Unknown	Italian: Un vampiro a Miami	
1996	Fatal Frames	Commissioner Bonelli		
1996	Sick-o-pathics	Dr. Loonies	Segment: "Aeropophagus"	
1997	Pervirella	Amicus Reilly	Posthumous release	
1997	Sudden Fury	Pike	Posthumous release	
1998	Razor Blade Smile	The Horror Movie Man	Posthumous release	

=== Television ===
Year	Title	Role	Notes
1968	Journey to the Unknown	Chris	Episode: "Do Me a Favor and Kill Me"
1968	Treasure Island	Abraham Grey	5 episodes
1969	The Borderers	Sentry	Episode: "Giant"
1969	The Elusive Pimpernel	Joshua Clutterbuck	Episode: "The Challenge"
1970	The Mating Machine	Young Man	Episode: "All About Little Eve"
1970–1971	UFO	Skydiver Captain	2 episodes
1971	Armchair Theatre	Nico	Episode: "Will Amelia Quint Continue Writing 'A Gnome Called Shorthouse'?"
1973	Spy Trap	Douglas Armstrong	3 episodes
1974	Thriller	Robert Miller	Episode: "Only a Scream Away"
1974	Marked Personal	Dave Buckley	2 episodes
1974	Not On Your Nellie	Fashion Photographer	Episode: "The Apartment"
1974	Notorious Woman	Stephane de Grandsagne	Episode: "The Misalliance"
1984	Minder	Roger Collins	Episode: "Second Hand Pose"
1987	Treasure Island in Outer Space	Dr. Livesey	Miniseries
1992	Golden Kimono Warrior	Lieutenant Alfred Jones	6 episodes

== Sources ==
- Bentley, Chris (2003). The Complete Book of Gerry Anderson's UFO. Richmond, London: Reynolds & Hearn Ltd. ISBN 978-1-903-11165-9.
- Frasier, David K. (1997). Russ Meyer—The Life and Films: A Biography and a Comprehensive, Illustrated and Annotated Filmography and Bibliography. Jefferson, North Carolina: McFarland. ISBN 978-0-786-48063-0.
- Kay, Glenn (2008). Zombie Movies: The Ultimate Guide. Chicago: Chicago Review Press. ISBN 978-1-569-76683-5.
- McFarlane, Brian, ed. (2016). The Encyclopedia of British Film (Fourth ed.). Oxford: Oxford University Press. ISBN 978-1-526-11197-5.
