= Luciano Pigozzi =

Italian actor (1927–2008)

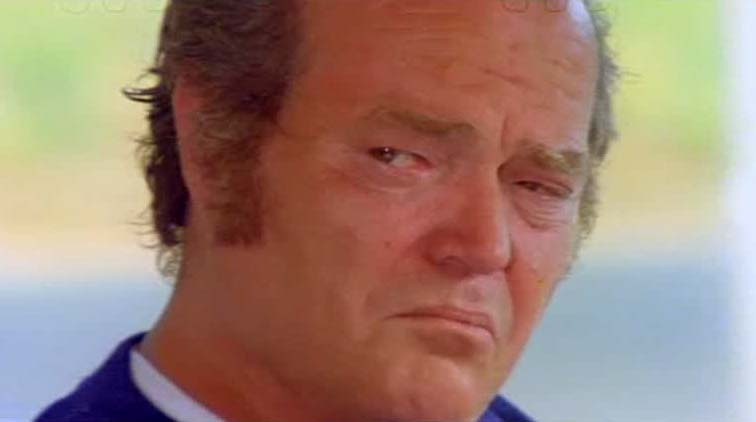
- Pigozzi in Syndicate Sadists (1975)
- Born: 10 January 1927; Novellara, Italy
- Died: 14 June 2008 (aged 81); Rome, Italy
- Other name: Alan Collins
- Occupation: Actor
- Years active: 1954–1989

Luciano Pigozzi (10 January 1927 – 14 June 2008), also known professionally as Alan Collins, was an Italian character actor. A long-time staple of Italian genre cinema, Pigozzi was noted for his resemblance to Peter Lorre and appeared in such films as Human Cobras, Yor, the Hunter from the Future, Ivanhoe, the Norman Swordsman, Blood and Black Lace, Libido and perhaps his goriest role in Baron Blood.

Born in Novellara, province of Reggio Emilia, in Italy; he appeared in more than one hundred films between 1954 and 1989, including many 1960s Italian thrillers such as Terror-Creatures from the Grave, Werewolf in a Girls' Dormitory and The Whip and the Body. Pigozzi died on 14 June 2008, at the age of 81.

== Selected filmography ==
- Scuola elementare (1955) - Teacher (uncredited)
- The Roof (1956)
- General Della Rovere (1959) - Prisoner
- Two Women (1960) - Scimmione, il capo miliziano
- Gli incensurati (1961) - Carmelo Ruotolo
- Don Camillo: Monsignor (1961) - Segretario del esponente comunista di Roma (uncredited)
- The Centurion (1961) - Corinthian Messenger
- Werewolf in a Girls' Dormitory (1961) - Walter Jeoffrey
- La monaca di Monza (1962)
- The Whip and the Body (1963) - Losat
- Blood and Black Lace (1964) - Cesare Lazzarini / Caesar Lazar
- La jena di Londra (1964) - Peter
- Castle of the Living Dead (1964) - Dart
- Secret Agent Fireball (1965) - Yuri
- Terror-Creatures from the Grave (1965) - Kurt, the Gardener
- Libido (1965) - Paul
- Berlin, Appointment for the Spies (1965) - Leonida
- Agent 077: From the Orient with Fury (1965) - Henchman with eye patch
- War Italian Style (1965) - German High-Ranking Officer
- The Almost Perfect Crime (1965) - Salah
- Killer's Carnival (1966) - Ivan (Rome segment) (uncredited)
- Ypotron - Final Countdown (1966) - Strike
- Diamonds Are a Man's Best Friend (1966) - Max
- Un brivido sulla pelle (1966)
- La spia che viene dal mare (1966)
- Master Stroke (1967) - Billy
- The Devil's Man (1967) - Kew - Scientifico
- Golden Chameleon (1967) - Aragosta
- La morte non conta i dollari (1967) - Judge Warren
- Dead Run (1967) - Van Joost
- The Young, the Evil and the Savage (1968) - La Foret
- Llaman de Jamaica, Mr. Ward (1968) - Lefty
- King of Africa (1968) - Kirby
- Vengeance (1968) - Domingo
- Taste of Vengeance (1968) - Bill Perkins
- Bootleggers (1969) - Capo dell'organizzazione
- The Unnaturals (1969) - Uriat
- Sabata (1969) - False Father Brown
- And God Said to Cain (1970) - Francesco Santamaria
- Hatchet for the Honeymoon (1970) - Vences
- Rendezvous with Dishonour (1970) - Mr. Anton
- Sartana in the Valley of Death (1970) - Paco
- Mr. Superinvisible (1970) - Raymond
- Le Voyou (1970)
- Defeat of the Mafia (1970) - Frankie Agostino
- Blackie the Pirate (1971) - Montbarque
- Ivanhoe, the Norman Swordsman (1971) - Mortimer
- His Name Was King (1971) - Mr. Collins
- Human Cobras (1971) - Louis Mortimer
- I due della F. 1 alla corsa più pazza, pazza del mondo (1971) - Herzog
- Dead Men Ride (1971) - Manolo, the barber
- The Price of Death (1971) - Doc Rosencrantz
- Trastevere (1971) - Righetto, un furibondo
- The Devil Has Seven Faces (1971) - Steve Hunter
- Kill! (1971) - Medina
- All the Colors of the Dark (1972) - Francis Clay
- It Can Be Done Amigo (1972)
- Baron Blood (1972) - Fritz
- The Case of the Bloody Iris (1972) - Fanelli, the Nightclub Owner (uncredited)
- Pulp (1972) - Clairvoyant
- I due gattoni a nove code... e mezza ad Amsterdam (1972) - Killer
- Seven Deaths in the Cat's Eye (1973) - Angus
- My Brother Anastasia (1973) - Pasquale
- Mr. Hercules Against Karate (1973) - Chief of Police
- Frankenstein's Castle of Freaks (1974) - Hans
- Il bacio di una morta (1974) - Berto
- Last Days of Mussolini (1974) - Renato Celio - Prefect of Como
- Death Will Have Your Eyes (1974) - Antonio il maggiordomo
- I sette magnifici cornuti (1974) - Gigetto, the Milkman
- Malocchio (1975) - Derek Stevens
- Il Sergente Rompiglioni diventa... caporale (1975) - Arthur Davis
- Legend of the Sea Wolf (1975) - Thomas Mugridge
- Syndicate Sadists (1975) - One of Conti's men
- The Bloodsucker Leads the Dance (1975) - Gregory
- La bolognese (1975) - Secondo - father of Caterina
- The Loves and Times of Scaramouche (1976) - Husband of Babette
- The Tough Ones (1976) - Moretto's Henchman
- Sfida sul fondo (1976)
- Liebes Lager (1976)
- Sorbole... che romagnola (1976) - Attilio
- Puttana galera! (1976)
- SS Girls (1977) - Professor Jürgen
- Return of the 38 Gang (1977) - Romolo
- Porci con la P 38 (1978) - John
- La ciudad maldita (1978) - Don Wilson
- Escape from Hell (1980) - The Warden
- The Last Hunter (1980) - Bartender
- Notturno con grida (1981) - Paul
- Tiger Joe (1982) - Lenny
- Hunters of the Golden Cobra (1982) - Greenwater
- Yor, the Hunter from the Future (1983) - Pag
- Exterminators of the Year 3000 (1983) - Papillon
- Tornado: The Last Blood (1983) - Freeman
- The Ark of the Sun God (1984) - Beetle
- Code Name: Wild Geese (1984) - Priest
- Jungle Raiders (1985) - Gin Fizz
- Commando Leopard (1985) - Friend of Carrasco's Father (uncredited)
- Operation Nam (1986) - Phil Lawson's father
- Strike Commando (1987) - Le Due
- Double Target (1987) - McDougall
- White Apache (1987) - Cribbens
- Zombi 3 (1988) - Plant Director (scenes deleted)
- Trappola diabolica (1988) - Smuggler Leader (scenes deleted)
- Robowar - Robot da guerra (1988) - (scenes deleted)
- Cop Game (1988) - Chief of Investigations (scenes deleted)
- Alien degli abissi (1989) - Dr. Geoffrey
- Nato per combattere (1989) - Prisoner #2 (scenes deleted)
