= Human Cobras =

- Directed by: Bitto Albertini
- Screenplay by: Ernesto Gastaldi; Eduardo Manzanos Brochero
- Story by: Eduardo Manzanos Brochero; Luciano Martino
- Produced by: Toni Di Carlo
- Starring: George Ardisson; Erika Blanc
- Cinematography: Emilio Foriscot
- Edited by: Alberto Gallitti
- Music by: Stelvio Cipriani
- Release date: 1971
- Running time: 86 minutes
- Countries: Italy; Spain; Sweden
- Language: Italian

Human Cobras (Italian: L'uomo più velenoso del cobra) is a 1971 Italian-Spanish giallo film directed by Bitto Albertini.

== Synopsis ==
A gangster seeks revenge on the people who killed his brother. A series of murders follow.

== Cast ==
- George Ardisson as Tony Garden
- Erika Blanc as Leslie F. Garden
- Alberto de Mendoza as George MacGreves
- Janine Reynaud as Clara
- Luciano Pigozzi as Louis Mortimer
- Aurora de Alba as Leslie's Friend
- Luis Induni as Humphrey
- Gilberto Galimberti as Maxie (credited as Gill Rolland)
- Miguel del Castillo as Manuel
- Gianni Pulone as Barista
- Percy Hogan as Police Inspector
- Fabián Conde
- Benedikte as Ragazza di Tony
- Fernando Hilbeck as Barry
