= Blood Debts =

1985 action film directed by Teddy Page

- VHS cover
- Directed by: Teddy Page
- Written by: Richard Harrison; Timothy Jorge
- Produced by: K.Y. Lim
- Starring: Richard Harrison; Mike Monty; James Gaines; Daniel Andrew
- Cinematography: Bob Aaron
- Edited by: David Mac
- Music by: Patrick Wales
- Distributed by: Silver Star Film Company
- Release date: 1985
- Running time: 86 minutes
- Country: Philippines
- Language: English

Blood Debts is a 1985 English-language Filipino action film directed by Teddy Page and starring Richard Harrison, Mike Monty, James Gaines, and Daniel Andrew. It follows the story of Mark Collins, a 45-year-old Vietnam veteran, who after witnessing his daughter being shot, becomes a vigilante.

The film garnered attention online due to its abrupt ending set to dissonantly jaunty music, with text over a freeze-frame stating that Mark was sentenced to life in prison for his vigilantism. The ending was a result of harsh censorship laws in the Philippines at the time, which was under the dictatorship of Ferdinand Marcos. These laws, among other things, forbade films from glorifying criminals.

== Plot ==
While enjoying a picnic, Sarah Collins and her boyfriend are surprised by a gang of five young criminals. They gang-rape her and kill him, but just before they are about to kill her she escapes and runs to her parents' house. The gang members shoot Sarah in front of her father, a wealthy Vietnam veteran named Mark. The boys wound him seriously and leave.

A few months later, Mark has recovered from his wound. He manages to find the murderers and kills each one of them. He also begins patrolling the streets at night, looking for criminals to execute until his wife Yvette convinces him to stop. However, he has been observed by the henchmen of Bill, an enigmatic businessman desiring to crush the local drug syndicate. Bill has Yvette kidnapped and forces Mark to continue his vigilante work.

Mark eventually escapes and stages a one-man assault on Bill's compound, obtaining and using progressively larger weapons from the henchmen he kills. However, Bill emerges with a pistol and shoots Mark in the back. As Bill prepares to shoot him again, Mark tears open his sleeve to reveal a small grenade-loaded flare gun and fires off a last-ditch shot, blowing up Bill. The film ends abruptly with a freeze frame of the explosion and text in all-lowercase Swiss style type—informing the audience that "mark collins, age 45, gave himself up to the authorities after the incident. he is now serving a life sentence."

== Cast ==
- Richard Harrison as Mark Collins
- Ann Jackson as Yvette Collins (credited as "Mark's Wife")
- Catherine Miles as Sarah Collins
- Mike Monty as Bill
- James Gaines as Peter
- Dick Israel as a rapist

== Reception ==
A mixed retrospective review at Spinning Image stated "Unsurprisingly the population of the Philippines has been rather cut down by the end, but that finale was what lent Blood Debts its shot at immortality: an abrupt, explosive retribution that was unexpectedly hilarious if you were in the right mood. It was a long way to go to reach it, though." Another review at the French B movie website Nanarland said: "It is a safe bet that faced with such a display of crass stupidity, filthy rapes and summary executions, many will remain unmoved."

Another analysis of the film found that it was "nuts" and that "Teddy Page and Richard Harrison together seems to almost guarantee goofiness. The dubbing is some of the funniest this side of For Y'ur Height Only.", an assessment confirmed in the book Spinegrinder.

== Internet popularity ==
The film ends very abruptly, with the credits rolling before the grenade explosion finishes or Bill's body parts hit the ground, with the actor substituted with an obvious and crude stunt mannequin. Simultaneously, a distorted and poorly-cut edit of the song "Lubricator" by Frank McDonald is played over the scene with the text "mark collins, age 45, gave himself up to the authorities after the incident. he is now serving a life sentence." and the credits. This ending has been uploaded several times on YouTube, usually with sarcastic titles to the effect of "The Proper Way to End Your Film"; the most popular upload on YouTube has over 12 million views.
