= Wolfshead: The Legend of Robin Hood =

- Directed by: John Hough
- Written by: David Butler
- Produced by: Bill Anderson
- Starring: David Warbeck; Ciaran Madden; Kathleen Byron; David Butler; Kenneth Gilbert
- Cinematography: David Holmes
- Edited by: Robert C. Dearberg
- Music by: Bernie Sharp; Jack Sprague
- Production companies: Hammer Film Productions; London Weekend Television
- Distributed by: Anglo-EMI Film Distributors
- Release date: 1973
- Running time: 56 minutes
- Country: United Kingdom
- Language: English

Wolfshead: The Legend of Robin Hood is a 1973 British adventure film directed by John Hough and starring David Warbeck, Ciaran Madden, Kathleen Byron, David Butler and Kenneth Gilbert. The film was actor David Warbeck's film debut, playing the lead role of Robin Hood. The film was originally a 1969 television series pilot but was released in movie theatres in 1973, as a support feature to the musical Take Me High. The film was also released on VHS under the title The Legend of Young Robin Hood.

The film's title comes from the medieval term Caput lupinum or "Wolfshead", meaning an outlaw.

== Plot ==
The film is set in the year 1190AD. Robert of Loxley, a simple farmer, is working his land when a fellow Saxon runs through their property attempting to escape Sir Jeffrey and the Royal Game Warden. Robert denies seeing the alleged poacher, and the fight, which ensues, is destined to seal his fate.

When Sir Jeffrey's brother, Roger of Doncaster, learns that Robert of Loxley was not killed for his insolence, he determines to use the incident to have him arrested and his lands confiscated. Sir Roger's ulterior motive is that his intended bride Lady Marian Fitzwater has had feelings for Robert from childhood and this stands in the way of his marriage to her. So he enlists the help of the Abbott to have Robert made a Wolfshead: an outlaw whose head is worth that of a wolf's, dead or alive.

== Cast ==
- David Warbeck as Robert of Locksley
- Kathleen Byron as Katherine of Locksley
- Dan Meaden as John Little of Cumberland
- Ciaran Madden as Lady Marian Fitzwalter
- Kenneth Gilbert as Friar Tuck
- Joe Cook as Much
- Derrick Gilbert as Wat
- David Butler as Will Stukely
- Patrick O'Dwyer as Tom
- Peter Stephens as Abbot of St. Mary's
- Christopher Robbie as Roger of Doncaster
- Roy Boyd as Geoffrey of Doncaster
- Pamela Roland as Adele
- Inigo Jackson as Legros
- Will Knightley as Abbot's Secretary
- Roy Evans as Gyrth
- Reg Lever as Old Wat
- Kim Braden as Alice
- Sheraton Blount as Abbie
- Nicholas Jones as Squire
- Sheelagh Wilcocks as Nurse

== Production ==
John Hough was directing on The Avengers when approached by journalist Bill Anderson. He had investors who wanted to spend money on a project that reminded them of "old England" and Anderson persuaded them to invest in a movie on Robin Hood. It was to be shot on location in Wales. Hough said David Butler wrote an "excellent script". Hough said Anderson ran out of money to finish the film but went to the races and successfully raised the rest via gambling. The movie was finished. Anderson arranged for the film to be released theatrically by Hammer Films, who put it on a double bill with Nearest And Dearest.

== Reception and influence ==
Howard Maxford, in his book Hammer Complete praised Wolfshead as a "brisk and entertaining variation on an over-familiar tale." Maxford added that "the film's only drawback is its rather abrupt ending."

Writer Richard Carpenter later described Wolfshead as an influence on his own series, Robin of Sherwood. Carpenter stated "What [Wolfshead] did was to have a very realistic look at being an outlaw in the 13th century and I wanted to have that element as well as the occult and humor."

== See also ==
- List of films and television series featuring Robin Hood
