= Antonio Marsina =

Italian actor (1946–2026)

- Born: 12 January 1946; Nardò, Italy
- Died: 6 March 2026 (aged 80); Nardò, Italy
- Occupation: Actor
- Years active: 1966–2004

Antonio Marsina (12 January 1946 – 6 March 2026) was an Italian actor who appeared in films from the 1960s to the 1980s. Marsina was born in Nardò on 12 January 1946. He died there on 6 March 2026, at the age of 80.

== Filmography ==
Year	Title	Role	Notes
1976	Keoma		
1982	Vatican Conspiracy		
1983	Tornado: The Last Blood	Captain Harlow	
