= The Ark of the Sun God =

- Vertical theatrical poster
- Directed by: Antonio Margheriti
- Written by: Giovanni Paolucci (story); Giovanni Simonelli
- Produced by: Giovanni Paolucci
- Starring: David Warbeck
- Cinematography: Sandro Mancori
- Edited by: Alberto Moriani
- Music by: Aldo Tamborelli
- Distributed by: Variety Distribution
- Release date: 10 May 1984 (Italy)
- Running time: 98 minutes
- Country: Italy
- Languages: Italian; English

Sopravvissuti della città morta (Survivors of the Dead City) or Ark of the Sun God is a 1984 Italian action film starring David Warbeck and directed by Antonio Margheriti. The film was partly filmed and produced in Turkey.

== Plot ==
A safecracker takes a job where he must go to Istanbul and steal a sceptre that once belonged to the god, Gilgamesh but is now in the temple of a secret cult.

== Cast ==
- David Warbeck - Rick Spear
- John Steiner - Lord Dean
- Susie Sudlow - Carol
- Luciano Pigozzi - Beetle (as Alan Collins)
- Ricardo Palacios - Mohammed
- Achille Brugnini - Rupert (as Anthony Berner)
- Aytekin Akkaya - Prince Abdullah
- Süleyman Turan
