= Hunters of the Golden Cobra =

- Directed by: Antonio Margheriti
- Written by: Tito Carpi; Gianfranco Couyoumdjian
- Starring: David Warbeck; Luciano Pigozzi
- Music by: Carlo Savina
- Release date: 1982
- Running time: 92 minutes
- Country: Italy
- Languages: Italian; English

Hunters of the Golden Cobra (Italian: I Cacciatori del Cobra d'Oro) is a 1982 Italian action film starring David Warbeck. It was directed by Antonio Margheriti, and is one of several Italian imitations of Raiders of the Lost Ark, shot in an exotic location involving the recovery of supernatural relics.

== Cast ==
- David Warbeck as Bob Jackson
- Almanta Suska as Julie / April
- Luciano Pigozzi as Greenwater (as Alan Collins)
- John Steiner as David Franks
- Protacio Dee as Yamato
- Rene Abadeza as Kamutri
- Rosemarie Lindt as Maude

== Release ==
Hunters of the Golden Cobra was released in the United States in March 1984.

== Critical reception ==
Fantastic Movie Musings & Ramblings wrote, "the violence is a bit nastier than that of RAIDERS, and the script seems like it was thrown together without much care, but I rather like the British soldier who is paired with the hero. Still, this one is routine at best."

== See also ==
- List of Italian films of 1982
