= Tiger Joe (film) =

- Italian theatrical release poster by Enzo Sciotti
- Directed by: Antonio Margheriti
- Written by: Tito Carpi
- Story by: Gianfranco Coujoumdjian
- Produced by: Gianfranco Couyoumdjian
- Starring: David Warbeck; Annie Belle; Tony King
- Cinematography: Riccardo Pallottini
- Music by: Carlo Savina
- Distributed by: Variety Distribution
- Release date: 1982
- Running time: 96 minutes
- Language: Italian

Tiger Joe (Italian: Fuga dall'arcipelago maledetto) is a 1982 Italian adventure film written and directed by Antonio Margheriti and starring David Warbeck, Annie Belle and Tony King.

== Plot ==
Tiger Joe is a former US Army Special Forces Vietnam Veteran now gunrunning to anti-Khmer Rouge freedom fighters. When his plane is shot down, Tiger Joe joins a female rebel in her fight.

== Cast ==
- David Warbeck as Joe "Tiger Joe"
- Annie Belle as Kia
- Tony King as "Midnight" Washington
- Alan Collins as Lenny
- Giancarlo Badessi as Bronski

== Production ==
Cinematographer Riccardo Pallottini died in a helicopter crash during production.

== Reception ==
Italian critic Tullio Kezich praised the film, claiming that it "is shot with a variety of images and rhythms sometimes lacking in its American counterparts" and "exudes a sense of cinema absent in works of far greater ambition".

== See also ==
- List of Italian films of 1982
