= Warbus =

- Theatrical release poster by Enzo Sciotti
- Directed by: Ted Kaplan
- Written by: Ferdinando Baldi; John Fitzsimmons
- Produced by: Francis F. Feels; Tony Miland
- Starring: Daniel Stephen; Romano Kristoff; Urs Althaus
- Cinematography: Mark Marsch
- Edited by: Med Salkin
- Music by: Robert Marry
- Production companies: Amerinda Est; Regal Films
- Distributed by: Surf Film
- Release date: March 25, 1985 (Portugal)
- Running time: 94 minutes
- Countries: Italy; Philippines
- Language: English

Warbus (also known as War Bus) is a 1985 Italian-Philippine internationally co-produced action film directed by Ferdinando Baldi under the pseudonym "Ted Kaplan".

== Premise ==
During the Vietnam War, three soldiers are escorting an old school bus carrying a group of missionaries. Completely surrounded by enemy soldiers, the heroes have a unique chance: make the vehicle reach an old military base, where they can call the rescue.

== Cast ==
- Daniel Stephen as Sgt. Dixie
- Romano Kristoff as Gus
- Urs Althaus as Ben
- Gwendolyn Hung as Anne
- Ernie Zarate as Major Kutran
- Don Gordon Bell as Ronnie
- Zeny R. Williams
- Josephine Sylva

== Release ==
The film was released in Portugal on March 25, 1985.
