= The Last Hunter =

1980 film directed by Antonio Margheriti

- Directed by: Antonio Margheriti
- Screenplay by: Dardano Sacchetti
- Story by: Gianfranco Couyoumdjian
- Produced by: Gianfranco Couyoumdjian
- Starring: David Warbeck; Tisa Farrow; Tony King; Bobby Rhodes
- Cinematography: Riccardo Pallottini
- Edited by: Alberto Moriani
- Music by: Franco Micalizzi
- Production companies: Flora Film; Gico Cinematografica
- Distributed by: Flora film
- Release dates: August 9, 1980 (Padula, Italy)
- Running time: 96 minutes
- Country: Italy

The Last Hunter (Italian: L'ultimo cacciatore) is a 1980 Italian "macaroni combat" film directed by Antonio Margheriti and starring David Warbeck and Tony King. Initially made to capitalize on the success of The Deer Hunter, The Last Hunter was the first "Euro War" film set during the Vietnam War, as opposed to World War II like all previous entries in the subgenre.

While not prosecuted for obscenity, the film was seized and confiscated in the UK under Section 3 of the Obscene Publications Act 1959 during the video nasty panic

== Plot ==
Following the suicide of his best friend, Captain Harry Morris (David Warbeck) accepts a final deadly mission to go behind enemy lines to destroy a radio tower that is broadcasting anti-war propaganda spoken by an American woman to American troops.

== Cast ==
- David Warbeck as Captain Henry Morris
- Tisa Farrow as Jane Foster
- Tony King as Sergeant George Washington
- Bobby Rhodes as Carlos
- Margit Evelyn Newton as Carol
- John Steiner as Major Bill Cash
- Massimo Vanni as Phillips
- Luciano Pigozzi as The Bartender

== Production ==
Unlike director Michael Cimino, Antonio Margheriti did not want to make a political film that was for or against the Vietnam War. He just wanted to make a Vietnam War film that was fun.

The Last Hunter was filmed in the Philippines in many of the same locations as Apocalypse Now. The film was extremely hard shoot due to heat, wildlife, and accidents on the set. Cinematographer Riccardo Pallottini later died in a helicopter crash during the production of a later Margheriti Vietnam War film, Tiger Joe.

== Releases ==
When The Deer Hunter was released in Italy, it was released under the title Il cacciatore (The Hunter). When Margheriti's film was released in Italy, it was titled Cacciatore 2, which led to critic Kim Newman commenting that this was ironic, as the film was more derivative of Apocalypse Now.

It was distributed by Flora film in Italy. It was released in Padua, Italy on August 9, 1980.

== Reception ==
From contemporary reviews, Tom Milne of the Monthly Film Bulletin described the film as an "Italian parasite feeding on Apocalypse Now" as well as comparing the film to The Green Berets as the "Vietcong atrocities dominate the film with the same grim relish, and partly because ideological conflicts are reduced to the same platitudinous level." The review also commented on the action scenes, which were found to be "directed with [...] crude uncomplicated vitality".
