= Antonio Margheriti =

Italian filmmaker

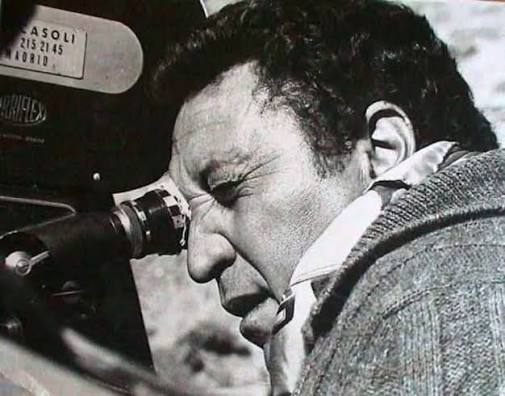
- Margheriti in the 1960s
- Born: 19 September 1930; Rome, Kingdom of Italy
- Died: 4 November 2002 (aged 72); Monterosi, Italy
- Other names: Anthony M. Dawson; Antony Daisies
- Occupations: Film director screenwriter

Antonio Margheriti (19 September 1930 – 4 November 2002), also known under the pseudonyms Anthony M. Dawson and Antony Daisies ("daisies" is "margherite" in Italian), was an Italian filmmaker. Margheriti worked in many different genres in the Italian film industry, and was known for his sometimes derivative but often stylish and entertaining science fiction, sword and sandal, horror/giallo, Eurospy, Spaghetti Western, Vietnam War and action movies that were released to a wide international audience. He died in 2002.

== Early life and career ==
Antonio Margheriti was born in Rome on 19 September 1930. Margheriti was the son of a railroad engineer and began his film career in 1950 working with Mario Serandrei. He then began making short documentaries beginning with Vecchia Roma in 1953. In 1954, Margheriti was credited with special effects in films such as Pino Mercanti's I cinque dell'Adamello and La notte che la terra tremo. By 1955 he was credited in screenplays such as Classe di ferro.

== Directing ==
Margheriti grew up reading science fiction comics, and when he was offered the film Assignment: Outer Space, he signed on as director. Being required to use an Anglo-Saxon pseudonym so the film could be sold internationally, he chose Anthony Daisies, a rough translation of his real name. However, he was later told that the name was unsuitable for the American market because in the United States, "Daisies" could be interpreted as having homosexual undertones. He then changed it to "Anthony Dawson", being unaware of the British actor of the same name. To avoid any confusion, he had to change again his pseudonym to "Anthony M. Dawson".

Margheriti followed up his first film with Battle of the Worlds starring actor Claude Rains, which was in turn followed by The Golden Arrow with Tab Hunter and some more peplum-style films such as The Fall of Rome and Giants of Rome. Other genres tackled in the 1960s included horror—Castle of Blood, The Long Hair of Death and The Virgin of Nuremberg and the Eurospy films: Bob Fleming... Mission Casablanca and Operazione Goldman.

Margheriti then returned to science fiction with his Gamma I series, originally filmed for the Italian television series Fantascienza but afterwards released theatrically. Margheriti followed these films with some westerns, including Take a Hard Ride and And God Said to Cain.

In the 1980s, Margheriti created films following the success of Platoon and Raiders of the Lost Ark, such as The Last Hunter and Hunters of the Golden Cobra, which both starred David Warbeck. Warbeck also starred in Tiger Joe, a film overshadowed by tragedy when Margheriti's long time cinematographer, Riccardo Pallottini, died in a plane crash while attempting to get the film's last shot.

He delved into the genre of films inspired by The Wild Geese with Code Name: Wild Geese and Commando Leopard starring Lewis Collins as well as Conan the Barbarian (1982) with Yor, the Hunter from the Future, which was shot in Turkey and was picked up by Columbia Pictures for an American release to 1400 theaters.

Margheriti died on 4 November 2002.

== Style ==
Margheriti's specialty in films was low budget efforts that fell into genres such as action and science fiction. To make films in short amounts of time, Margheriti applied techniques such as shooting with several cameras simultaneously, allowing him to record master shots, close-ups, and more. This often led him to light films very carefully, and allowed him to create several films per year.

== Partial filmography ==
Note: The films listed as N/A are not necessarily chronological.

Title	Year	Credited as				Notes	Ref(s)
Title	Year	Director	Screenwriter	Screen story writer	Other	Notes	Ref(s)
Assignment: Outer Space	1960	Yes	Yes				
Battle of the Worlds	1961	Yes					
The Golden Arrow	1962	Yes					
The Fall of Rome	1963	Yes	Yes				
The Virgin of Nuremberg	1963	Yes	Yes				
Castle of Blood	1964	Yes					
Devil of the Desert Against the Son of Hercules	1964	Yes					
Hercules, Prisoner of Evil	1964	Yes					
Giants of Rome	1964	Yes					
The Long Hair of Death	1964	Yes	Yes				
Wild, Wild Planet	1966	Yes					
Lightning Bolt	1966	Yes					
The Young, the Evil and the Savage	1968	Yes	Yes				
The Unnaturals	1969	Yes	Yes	Yes	Yes	Producer	
And God Said to Cain	1970	Yes	Yes				
Web of the Spider	1971	Yes	Yes				
Treasure Island	1972		Yes				
Seven Deaths in the Cat's Eye	1973	Yes	Yes				
Rudeness	1975		Yes	Yes			
Death Rage	1976	Yes					
The Rip-Off	1978	Yes					
The Last Hunter	1980	Yes					
Cannibal Apocalypse	1980	Yes					
Car Crash	1981	Yes					
Yor, the Hunter from the Future	1983	Yes	Yes				
Tornado: The Last Blood	1983	Yes					
Code Name: Wild Geese	1984	Yes	Yes				
Jungle Raiders	1985	Yes					
Presentimento	—N/a	Yes	Yes				
Classe di ferro	—N/a		Yes	Yes			
Gambe d'oro	—N/a	Yes	Yes				
Promesse di marinaio	—N/a		Yes	Yes			
Roulotte e roulette	—N/a		Yes	Yes			
Solitudine	—N/a		Yes				
Il pelo nel mondo	—N/a	Yes					
War of the Planets	—N/a	Yes					
Bob Fleming... Mission Casablanca	—N/a	Yes					
Dynamite Joe	—N/a	Yes					
Io ti amo	—N/a	Yes	Yes	Yes			
Vengeance	—N/a	Yes	Yes				
Mr. Superinvisible	—N/a	Yes					
House of 1000 Pleasures	—N/a	Yes	Yes				
Novelle galeotte d'amore dal Decamerone	—N/a	Yes	Yes	Yes			
Mr. Hercules Against Karate	—N/a	Yes	Yes				
The Stranger and the Gunfighter	—N/a	Yes	Yes				
Manone il ladrone	—N/a	Yes	Yes	Yes			
Fantasma en el Oeste	—N/a	Yes	Yes	Yes			
Hunters of the Golden Cobra	—N/a	Yes					
Tiger Joe	—N/a	Yes					
The Ark of the Sun God	—N/a	Yes					
Commando Leopard	—N/a	Yes					
The Commander	—N/a	Yes					
Alien From the Deep	—N/a	Yes					
Indio	—N/a	Yes					
Indio 2 - La rivolta	—N/a	Yes					

== Legacy ==
In the documentary on the Image DVD release of his film Cannibal Apocalypse, Margheriti proudly mentioned that it was Quentin Tarantino's favorite among his films. In Tarantino's film Inglourious Basterds, Eli Roth's character Donny Donowitz uses "Antonio Margheriti" as an alias in an undercover operation at the cinema screening of Stolz der Nation. There is also a reference in Tarantino's film, Once Upon a Time in Hollywood. In said film, Leonardo DiCaprio portrays the fictional actor Rick Dalton, who goes to Italy in 1969 to film Spaghetti Westerns, including one spy thriller directed by Margheriti titled Operazione Dyn-o-mite.

== See also ==
- Italian science fiction cinema
