= Italian science fiction cinema =

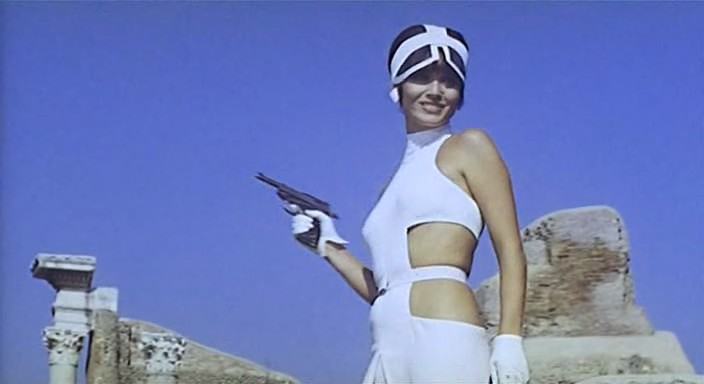
Elsa Martinelli in the film The 10th Victim (La decima vittima, 1965) by Elio Petri

Italian science fiction cinema, the expression of a film genre that remained a minority in Italy, is, with some exceptions, a cinematic strand of popular entertainment, characterized by films born in the wake of successful American films but with much lower production costs. Some of these films made in Italy, although considered B movies, were known and admired even abroad; among the directors who contributed to the development of the strand were Antonio Margheriti (Anthony M. Dawson) and Mario Bava, who distinguished themselves respectively in space opera and science fiction horror.

The birth of the strand is traditionally dated to 1958, but the rediscovery of earlier silent works has led to reconsideration of this date. Italian fantastic and science fiction cinema is marked by a frequent mixture of different genres, with a particular closeness to horror; satire and parody also represent one of the most characteristic contributions of Italian cinema to science fiction. Alongside more strictly genre production, some art film directors, active during their careers in different genres or forms, also occasionally engaged with science fiction: Elio Petri, Marco Ferreri, Ugo Tognazzi, Pupi Avati and Gabriele Salvatores. Outside national borders, Italian figures such as special effects creator Carlo Rambaldi, three-time Oscar winner, and Dino De Laurentiis, producer also of an Oscar-winning film, operated as well.

From the second half of the 1980s Italian genre cinema entered a crisis; in the following decade the tendency to produce science fiction for the international public was exhausted. In the 2000s, independent productions gained prominence instead: digital technologies made it possible to contain some costs and expanded the ways of distributing and viewing films. Since the 2010s Italian science fiction has returned with dystopias, eco-dystopias, uchronias and post-catastrophe narratives, as well as stories about the relationships between human beings, technology and the environment.

== Origins ==
A Marriage in the Moon (Un matrimonio interplanetario, 1910) by Enrico Novelli (Yambo)

The Mechanical Man (L'uomo meccanico, 1921) by André Deed

For a long time 1958 was indicated as the start date of Italian science fiction in cinema: in that year The Day the Sky Exploded (La morte viene dallo spazio, 1958) was released, a film by Paolo Heusch in which the Earth is threatened by a rain of asteroids and which anticipates the disaster film strand; the subsequent rediscovery of silent works, particularly The Mechanical Man (L'uomo meccanico, 1921), has however led to a reconsideration of this date. The second half of the 1950s was a golden period for overseas cinematic science fiction, and Heusch took up a strand of clear American origin; photography and special effects were by Mario Bava. An Italian-French co-production, The Day the Sky Exploded gives a decisive role to atomic energy: an atomic rocket causes the initial threat, while in the finale the great powers employ nuclear-tipped missiles to destroy the asteroids. In the United States it was released in 1961 under the title The Day the Sky Exploded; in Italy it cost 120 million lire and grossed 142 million, while the film has been considered one of the best Italian genre films and a contemporary review praised the ingenuity of the plot and the ability to maintain narrative tension until the conclusion.

However, there are fantastic-science fiction films well before 1958, which prevent the beginning of the strand from being fixed with certainty in the post-war period. If these films are also included, Italian cinematic science fiction goes back at least to 1910, with the short film Un matrimonio interplanetario by Enrico Novelli (Yambo), a comedy telling the story of a love between an earthling and a beautiful Martian, sparked by an observation through a telescope and nourished by radiotelegraphic signals. Among the first expressions of Italian cinematic science fiction is also Le avventure straordinarissime di Saturnino Farandola (1913), a fantastic comic film starring and directed by Marcel Fabre and based on the novel by Albert Robida. Even a lost film of 1920, Il mostro di Frankenstein directed by Eugenio Testa, often identified as the first Italian horror film, although the loss of the film and the scarcity of surviving materials do not allow its genre to be established with certainty, can in turn be considered one of the very first science fiction films in Italy. The plot features a scientist who manufactures a man by means of a chemical formula; the creature rebels against its creator and causes a series of disasters before being stopped. The story thus arises from a scientific or technological element.

Silent production also included strands linked to scientific inventions and medicine, aerial warfare and futurism. In L'altro io (1917) by Mario Bonnard a transplant of part of the brain causes the appearance of two distinct consciousnesses in the protagonist, while Il sole e i pazzi (1920) by Umberto Paradisi revolves around a machine powered by electricity obtained from solar rays and designed to influence the behavior of the mentally ill. Aerial warfare appears in the fourth episode of Le avventure straordinarissime di Saturnino Farandola, with airships and other flying machines engaged in a technological war; it returns in La guerra e il sogno di Momi, where the protagonist's dream includes the bombing of a village by airships and biplanes, with stop-motion animated toy soldiers. On the futurist side, Mondo Baldoria (1914) by Aldo Molinari was presented as the first futurist film, although Marinetti rejected it as a counterfeit of the movement, while Vita futurista (1916) by Arnaldo Ginna was the first actual futurist film production and only a few fragments survive.

In 1921, still in the silent film era, André Deed, known to Italian audiences for his comic character Cretinetti, wrote, directed and starred in L'uomo meccanico, among the very first films in cinema history centered on a robot (in this case remote-controlled) and the first to show a clash between a good robot and an evil one; the control of the machine by a foreign woman also recalls gender relations and places the consequences of its destructive use on whoever operates it. On the theme of the automaton there is also La bambola vivente of 1924 by Luigi Maggi, in which a scientist builds an automaton taking his daughter as a model. The first Italian animated film attributable to the genre is Dalla Terra alla Luna, an animated film made in 1920 by Carlo Alberto Zambonelli for Tiziano Film; the following year Gino Zaccaria made Un viaggio nella Luna, "where, among a group of puppets, we find one who with his dreams ends up traveling through space and reaching the Moon".

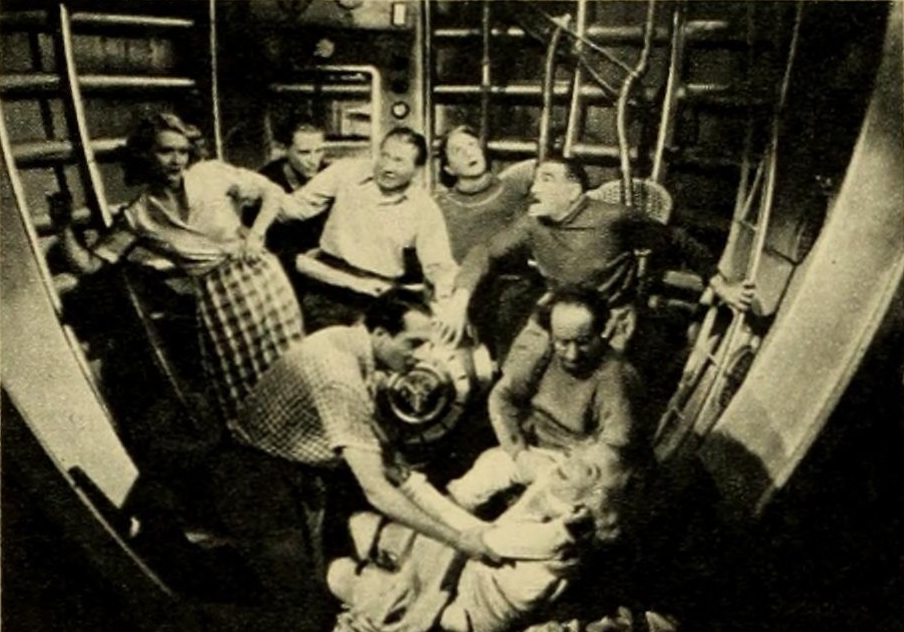
Mille chilometri al minuto! (1939) by Mario Mattoli, one of the first Italian incursions into science fiction cinema and the first sound film of the genre.

The first Italian sound film of the genre is Mille chilometri al minuto! (1939); the farcical excursion into the fantastic by Mario Mattoli took Italian sound cinema into space for the first time with a flight to Mars, which however is interrupted almost as soon as it begins: instead of reaching the Red Planet, due to a calculation error the rocket falls back to Earth after a few days of travel. Science fiction elements are present in La casa senza tempo (1945), directed by Andrea Forzano (under the pseudonym Andrea Della Sabbia) who also wrote the subject and screenplay, which has been defined as "an extravagant example of Italian 'yellow-pink' spy-fi made in the midst of the world conflict". Starring Rossano Brazzi and Vivi Gioi together with many other popular actors of the "white telephone cinema", it began as a propaganda film for the Fascist regime: a spy story about a group of fascists trying to discover military plans for the construction of a new warplane by the Anglo-American forces, triggering a series of mysterious disappearances and murders, although in the end the protagonists manage to triumph over the enemies. After the end of the war and the collapse of the fascist regime, the film was re-dubbed and re-edited, and thus the group of fascists became a group of partisans and the enemy forces changed from Anglo-American to Nazi. An earlier spy film had been directed in 1938 by Domenico Gambino: Lotte nell'ombra, with Antonio Centa and Paola Barbara, whose plot revolves around the theft of the formula for a new military explosive.

Macario contro Zagomar (1944), by Giorgio Ferroni, builds its plot around a professor's invention, a machine that forces the same movements on everyone within its range and that a criminal tries to seize. Science fiction began to find success in Italy only in the 1950s, however. Italian literary science fiction gained recognition as a genre in 1952, with the publication of the first specialized magazines, Scienza fantastica, Mondi nuovi and Urania. The Italian term "fantascienza" was born in the same year, created by Giorgio Monicelli as a free calque of the American science fiction.

La bisarca (1950), by Giorgio Simonelli, includes, in the protagonist's dream, a man who, after having accidentally swallowed uranium, ends up exploding and blowing up the ark on which the characters are. È l'amor che mi rovina (1951), by Mario Soldati, inserts into the comic plot a spy intrigue centered on a ring containing an atomic substance stolen from secret laboratories, capable of causing violent explosions when it comes into contact with snow. Stasera sciopero (1951), by Mario Bonnard, adopts a brain transplant as a comic device, with the brain of a dead man implanted in the skull of the miserly protagonist and the consequent alternation of the two personalities. In Noi due soli of 1952, directed by Marcello Marchesi, Vittorio Metz and Marino Girolami, the protagonist dreams instead that an atomic experiment has wiped out the human race, leaving only three survivors. The Franco-Italian co-production Alarm in Morocco (Allarme a sud, 1954) by Jean Devaivre builds its spy plot around a ray developed at a secret German base, able to paralyze and kill.

Another of the first Italian films defined as "science fiction" is Baracca e burattini of 1954 directed by Sergio Corbucci, inspired by the theatrical revue of the same name by Maccari and Amendola. It tells of a dweller of the Moon who, after the explosion of a bomb, falls to Earth; a puppet, as soon as it is touched by the extraterrestrial, comes to life and shows him the nature and function of various terrestrial objects. Io piaccio (1955), by Giorgio Bianchi, adopts as a comic device a hormonal preparation that should instill courage but instead makes the protagonist irresistible to women.

== The boom of the 1960s ==
No scene in this film takes place on that planet of the solar system known by the name Earth.

— Advertising slogan for Space Men

In the 1960s Italian cinema experienced a veritable boom, with the production of numerous film genres, especially pepla, spaghetti westerns, horror and spy films. Science fiction also experienced an unprecedented production surge in the decade, accompanied by a sociological strand that reflected on the changes of the Italian economic miracle, the 1968 movement and the beginning of the 1970s. The science fiction genre involved relatively few titles and not large productions, relying mainly on low-budget films also aimed at the international market; special effects remained very poor compared to Hollywood productions, although sometimes ingenious, while the casts included unknown or little-known actors, some of whom would become famous in other genres, such as Franco Nero, Ombretta Colli and Renzo Palmer. The screenplays were often naive and fragile, limited to copying imported formulas and models; since the market was dominated by American films, Italian directors and actors often appeared in credits under Anglo-Saxon pseudonyms to make the productions appear foreign. The most widespread strand in the first half of the decade remained space adventure (with a clear reference to American space opera), of which Antonio Margheriti was the main director and one of the pioneers in Italy, together with science fiction horror.

=== Space adventure and production cycles ===
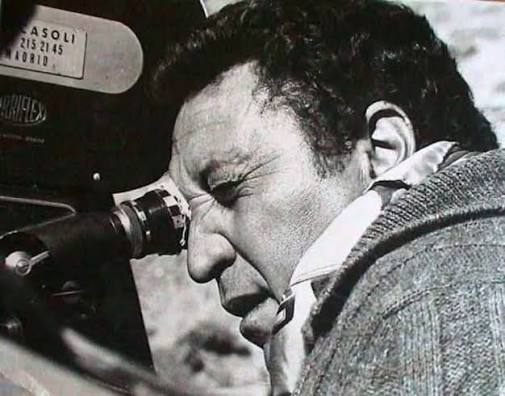
Antonio Margheriti in the 1960s, director of the Gamma One cycle

Assignment: Outer Space (Space Men, 1960) marked the directorial debut of Antonio Margheriti, who signed under the pseudonym Anthony Daisies; after this first film, he adopted the better-known pseudonym Anthony M. Dawson, under which he would be credited in most of his subsequent international productions. Among the screenwriters was Ennio De Concini, credited as Vassilji Petrov and already among the most experienced screenwriters of Italian cinema of those years. At the center of the plot is Alfa-2, the first photonic interstellar spaceship, which returns to the solar system out of control and heads towards Earth surrounded by a deadly energy field; technological progress thus appears both as an achievement and as a possible loss of humanity, while human intuition and courage defeat the automatic system. The film had strong commercial success, grossing about ten times its production cost and being sold worldwide; Margheriti recalled making it for about 48 million lire (the director stated that, in general, the shooting of his films rarely lasted more than two weeks, with one day for special effects), and even in these early works Margheriti mixed genres, as he would go on doing throughout his career among science fiction, horror, western, peplum, spy, comedy, war and adventure films.

The success of Assignment: Outer Space convinced Goffredo Lombardo to entrust Margheriti immediately with Battle of the Worlds (Il pianeta degli uomini spenti, 1961), in which Claude Rains played the scientist at the center of the story; the director's second space opera, the film shifts the threat from a spaceship to an entire planet that enters the solar system and risks collision with Earth, while the civilization that inhabited it is extinct and its machines keep working. The character played by Rains also recalls Zarkov from Alex Raymond's Flash Gordon. The remains of the extinct inhabitants were represented by tangles of red and green illuminated plastic tubes.

Among the short films of the period, Si chiamava Terra (1963) by Corrado Farina is an amateur 8 mm color film: a spaceship forced to make an emergency landing on Earth leads the pilot to discover, through a recording, the disappearance of the human race; the film uses science fiction above all to explore the relationship between technology and human feelings, up to the prospect of man being crushed by the civilization of machines.

1965 was the most prolific year for Italian science fiction cinema. The Gamma One space station cycle, made between 1965 and 1967, includes Wild, Wild Planet (I criminali della galassia, 1965), War of the Planets (I diafanoidi vengono da Marte, 1966), War Between the Planets (Il pianeta errante, 1966) and Snow Devils (La morte viene dal pianeta Aytin, 1967); the four films were shot simultaneously in twelve weeks, reusing sets, props and most of the cast, while in the third one a group of astronauts must prevent a collision with a planet that has left its orbit. Produced by Mercury Film International on behalf of Metro-Goldwyn-Mayer, the quadrilogy had initially been commissioned for American television and aimed to offer the American public an Italian approach to science fiction, reworking the American model artisanally and with limited means following the success of the Spaghetti Western; MGM then decided to launch it in American theaters before television exploitation, while in Italy the four films achieved moderate success. The special effects of Wild, Wild Planet and War of the Planets are credited to Aurelio Pennacchia. Among the cast appeared Lisa Gastoni, Ombretta Colli, Franco Nero, Giacomo Rossi Stuart and Enzo Fiermonte, with casts partly reused from one film to another according to the production organization of the cycle.

=== Science fiction and horror ===
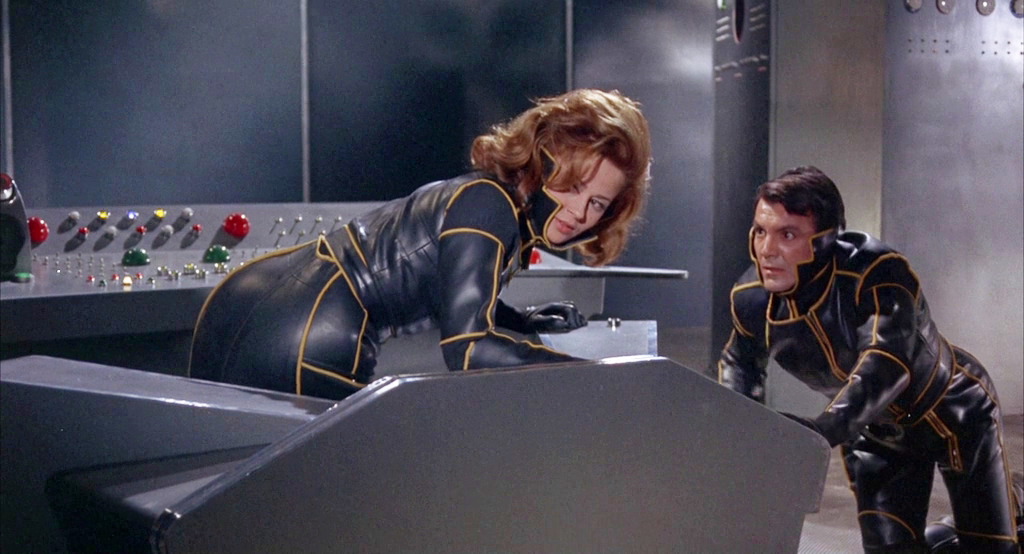
Norma Bengell in Planet of the Vampires (Terrore nello spazio, 1965) by Mario Bava

Among the films that brought science fiction and horror together in the early 1960s was Mill of the Stone Women (Il mulino delle donne di pietra, 1960) by Giorgio Ferroni, considered together with Black Sunday (La maschera del demonio, 1960) one of the two most influential Italian horror films released in the same year; both were ambitious projects also intended for the foreign market, and in 1963 Mill of the Stone Women entered the American catalog of Parade Pictures. In the film, the scientific vampirism already present in I Vampiri (1957) is developed through blood transfusions practiced to keep a young woman alive, while the victims' bodies are transformed into macabre sculptures; also recalling House of Wax (1953) and the earlier Mystery of the Wax Museum (1933), the film experiments with color and hallucinatory sequences that distinguish it from other Italian horror films of the same year. The theme of experiments on the body to restore a lost appearance recurs in Eyes Without a Face (Occhi senza volto, 1960), a Franco-Italian co-production by Georges Franju in which a surgeon kidnaps young women to graft their skin onto his daughter's disfigured face; Atom Age Vampire (Seddok, l'erede di Satana, 1960) by Anton Giulio Majano reworks instead the motif of Jekyll and Hyde, making use of a serum capable of regenerating tissues and following the success obtained by Eyes Without a Face. The comedy My Friend, Dr. Jekyll (Il mio amico Jekyll, 1960), by Marino Girolami, finally turns into farce the motif of the scientist who alters the protagonist's personality, instilling primitive instincts in him.

The Last Man on Earth (L'ultimo uomo della Terra, 1964), an Italian-American co-production directed by Sidney Salkow and Ubaldo Ragona and based on the novel I Am Legend by Richard Matheson, presents a pestilence that transforms survivors into vampires, leaving only one scientist immune, while a serum and a blood transfusion offer a temporary possibility of countering the transformation; set in a hallucinated Rome, the film was distributed in the United States by American International Pictures in the same year. The EUR and its fascist-origin architectures transform the apocalypse into a reflection on an Italy suspended between memory of fascism, Americanization and consequences of the colonial past; the juxtaposition of Italian and American elements also recalls the cultural relations between the two countries. The direction of Castle of the Living Dead (Il castello dei morti vivi, 1964) is attributed to Warren Kiefer and Luciano Ricci (credited as Herbert Wise); Kiefer signed under the pseudonym Lorenzo Sabatini, and a possible contribution by Michael Reeves has also been noted. In the film, horror is joined by a pseudoscientific element: a count uses a drug of his invention that causes instant death and immediate embalming of the victims. Mario Bava made the following year Planet of the Vampires (Terrore nello spazio, 1965), one of the best Italian science fiction films, based on the short story One Night of 21 Hours by Renato Pestriniero and centered on astronauts who, having landed on an unknown planet, are attacked and possessed by incorporeal alien entities. Bava grafted his Gothic talent onto science fiction, relying in particular on color, costumes and sets; the film maintains constant Gothic effects, and the sequence of the ancient alien spaceship with the giant skeleton finds a very faithful echo in Ridley Scott's Alien (1979).

=== The fanta-mythological ===
Reg Park in Hercules and the Conquest of Atlantis (Ercole alla conquista di Atlantide, 1961)

In the 1960s the great development of the peplum and other film genres, also favored by the activity of the Roman studios, often led to mixing different strands; especially in 1961 numerous pepla, costume films and adventure films with fights were made, set in fantastic worlds freely inspired by classical mythology and soon moving away from myth towards fantasy subjects: the "fanta-mythological" strand developed, which in some cases also included science fiction elements.

Journey Beneath the Desert (Antinea, l'amante della città sepolta, 1961) by Edgar G. Ulmer and Giuseppe Masini is the fourth film adaptation of the novel L'Atlantide by Pierre Benoît; on the eve of a nuclear test, the three crew members of a helicopter forced to land in the Sahara are taken to the underground kingdom of Atlantis, where the survivors of the city live and a ruthless queen reigns, while the kingdom is threatened by the imminent atomic explosion; the cast of the Italian-French co-production includes well-known actors such as Jean-Louis Trintignant, Amedeo Nazzari and Gian Maria Volonté.

The Atlantis theme was taken up the same year in a peplum, Hercules and the Conquest of Atlantis (Ercole alla conquista di Atlantide, 1961) by Vittorio Cottafavi with Reg Park, Enrico Maria Salerno and Gian Maria Volonté: the protagonist reaches Atlantis and discovers the secret of its power, eventually managing to destroy its powers. On the myth of Atlantis the film grafts typical science fiction elements, including an implicit reference to atomic energy, also linking the story to the present through references to Nazism and to theories of an Aryan race destined to dominate the world; contemporary critics already judged it a successful work, rich in inventions and capable of maintaining grace and measure despite the irony.

The Giant of Metropolis (Il gigante di Metropolis, 1961) by Umberto Scarpelli is set in 20,000 BC in the city of Metropolis, governed by a mad dictator who disposes of an extremely advanced science: intruders are struck by a magnetic storm, and the ruler conducts reckless scientific experiments such as brain transplants. Hercules in the Valley of Woe (Maciste contro Ercole nella valle dei guai, 1961), by Mario Mattoli, uses a more explicit science fiction device: the protagonists use a time machine with the intention of reaching the future but are transported seven thousand years into the past, where they meet the two heroes of the title. In the 1964 film Hercules Against the Moon Men (Maciste e la regina di Samar, 1964) by Giacomo Gentilomo, the protagonist Hercules instead has to face an entire army of space invaders from the Moon, who dominate the kingdom of Samar, impose periodic sacrifices and try to bring their queen back to life. Also belonging to the strand is Conqueror of Atlantis (Il conquistatore di Atlantide, 1965) by Alfonso Brescia, in which the protagonist reaches the ruins of Atlantis, where the survivors produce beings without their own will with the intention of conquering the world.

=== Italian-style spy-fi ===
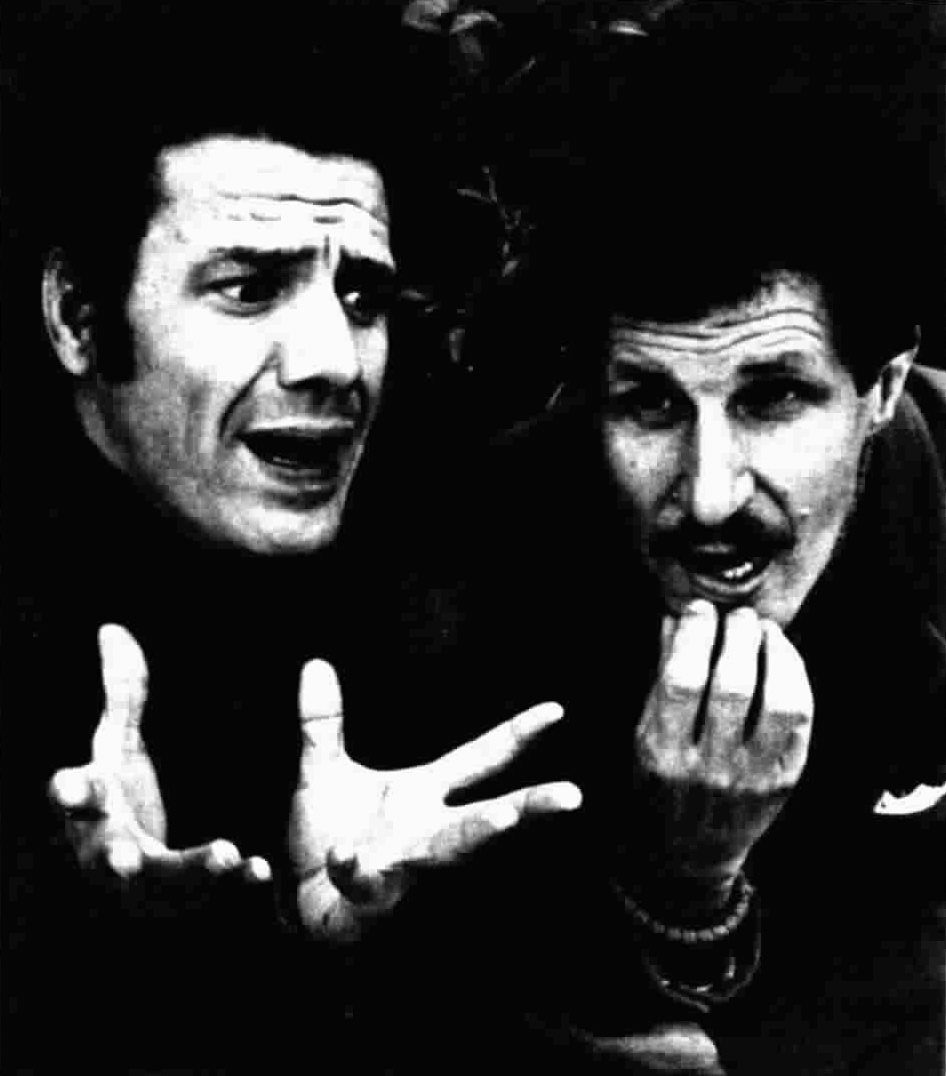
The comedy duo Franco Franchi and Ciccio Ingrassia, in the cast of Dr. Goldfoot and the Girl Bombs (Le spie vengono dal semifreddo, 1966)

Italian cinema between 1964 and 1969 was flooded by a wave of low-budget spy-fi films that sought above all to imitate the successful British films dedicated to James Bond, Agent 007 created by Ian Fleming. In the period about 150 titles were made, including parodies, often in collaboration with other European countries and with modest ambitions, shooting quickly and resorting to strongly stereotyped formulas based on the Bond model: the heroic secret agent is flanked by provocative women and faces mad scientists or evil secret organizations that nurture insane plans for world domination through science-fictional and improbable apocalyptic weapons.

Planets Against Us (I pianeti contro di noi, 1962), by Romano Ferrara, grafts science fiction elements onto a spy plot: an individual capable of blocking radar in areas of atomic interest and of disintegrating an agent turns out to be an artificial being in human form from extraterrestrial regions. The strand also lent itself immediately to parody: in Dr. Goldfoot and the Girl Bombs (Le spie vengono dal semifreddo, 1966) by Mario Bava, an Italian-American co-production with Vincent Price and the comedy duo Franco and Ciccio, an "electronic brain" starts the investigation, a scientist artificially produces young women and the criminal plan culminates in the attempt to seize an atomic aircraft to launch a nuclear device on Moscow; in the United States the film was distributed by American International Pictures. The same comic vein includes Il vostro super agente Flit (1966), with Raimondo Vianello: the protagonist, equipped with an "electronic brain", investigates diplomatic incidents caused by extraterrestrials aiming at nuclear war and galactic domination. In the two James Tont films, played by Lando Buzzanca, the parody passes first through a record connected to an explosive charge intended to destroy the UN building and then through the hibernation of the agent and a plan to put into orbit the top sphere of Saint Peter's dome with the basilica's treasure. James Tont operazione U.N.O. (1965) achieved among the best Italian commercial results in the strand, adapting the formula through already popular comic actors and the use of comedy, while the two films have been re-evaluated for their comic inventions and considered an anticipation of the Austin Powers series.

Among the spy films of the period with particularly explicit science fiction elements, Operation Counterspy (Asso di picche – Operazione controspionaggio, 1965) by Nick Nostro presents a secret atomic plant and a global blackmail plan based on nuclear devices. In Matchless (1967) by Alberto Lattuada a ring allows the protagonist to become invisible for twenty minutes every ten hours, while international powers contend for a formula and some vials of a secret liquid. The science fiction thriller Mission Stardust (...4..3..2..1...morte, 1967) by Primo Zeglio is inspired by Perry Rhodan, protagonist of a German series that had enormous success in its homeland and whose characterization also draws on previous heroes of science fiction adventure such as Flash Gordon; the plot freely mixes space adventure with a spy story; in West Germany the film was released the same year under the title Perry Rhodan – SOS aus dem Weltall.

=== The masked superheroes ===
Among the first masked superheroes of Italian cinema are those of Superargo Versus Diabolicus (Superargo contro Diabolikus, 1966), directed by Nick Nostro, and of Goldface, the Fantastic Superman (Goldface – Il fantastico superman, 1967) by Bitto Albertini; they were characters born on the example of Mexican lucha libre wrestlers and inserted in spy-fi plots. In Superargo contro Diabolikus the protagonist is modeled above all on the Mexican wrestler El Santo, who appeared on Italian screens as Argos, while the film is a co-production with Spain; a criminal scientist assaults ships carrying uranium and mercury and uses modern plants to produce an isotope of gold with which he intends to undermine the world economy, in a story that moves from adventure to espionage with science fiction elements, with a comic-strip and ironic tone and artisanally made effects.

Among the other masked heroes of the period are Phenomenal and the Treasure of Tutankhamen (Fenomenal e il tesoro di Tutankamen, 1968), Flashman (1967) and Fantabulous Inc. (La donna, il sesso e il superuomo, 1967). Flashman (1967), by Mino Loy and Luciano Martino, presents a serum capable of making people invisible, while Argoman the Fantastic Superman (Come rubare la corona d'Inghilterra, 1967) by Sergio Grieco presents a superhero, a diamond formed after an atomic explosion and humanoids created with the appearance of politicians. The most important series of the strand is that of The Three Fantastic Supermen (I fantastici 3 Supermen, 1967): the 1967 film, directed by Gianfranco Parolini as Frank Kramer, started an acrobatic series modeled on the Superargo films and continued with seven sequels of varying success, in which directors, actors and character names changed several times. In the first film the three protagonists, endowed with great physical strength and acrobatic qualities, wear bulletproof vests created by a scientist and face a machine capable of duplicating objects and people, maintaining an ironic tone that playfully treats comic-book models for young people.

In 1968 Mario Bava directed Danger: Diabolik (Diabolik, 1968), a project entrusted to him by Dino De Laurentiis and based on the comic by the Giussani sisters: it belongs to the producer's series of adaptations of science fiction comics, begun with Barbarella and continued with Flash Gordon, with a supercriminal protagonist in the line of Fantômas but equipped with the technological arsenal of the 007 films; The Encyclopedia of Science Fiction judges it futuristic but only marginally science fiction. Among the adaptations of the black comic, it stands out for its deliberately glossy look, maintaining an Italian identity while adopting foreign genres destined for the international market and recalling Pop art. On screen, however, the masked thief had already arrived in comic form: in 1966 Johnny Dorelli had launched the character of Dorellik in the television variety show Johnny Sera, a bungling criminal in a bodysuit built as a caricature of Diabolik, brought to the big screen the following year by Steno in How to Kill 400 Duponts (Arrriva Dorellik, 1967), which precedes Bava's film by a year although the latter had been in production since 1964. Dorellik's introduction, with its diabolical laugh and a sudden zoom onto the face, is the same formula Bava reuses for his protagonist's first appearance: the "serious" adaptation arrives after the caricatures.

== Social science fiction, satire and dystopia ==
Between the late 1960s and early 1970s, with the 1968 movement and the strong political and social changes that accompanied it, cinema also showed a growing interest in social science fiction, often using fantastic situations to address contemporary society's problems in a critical or satirical form. In these stories the science fiction elements depend above all on the premise of the narrative, rather than on the sets; despite limited means, these films experiment with particularly original visual and narrative solutions. Satire and parody are perhaps the only true area in which Italian science fiction cinema has been able to offer original contributions. Science fiction elements also appear in art cinema: in L'Eclisse (1962) and Red Desert (Il deserto rosso, 1964) by Michelangelo Antonioni, they have been recognized in the almost automatic movements of the characters and in the urban and industrial spaces, described as non-places with a post-atomic appearance; in the second film science fiction also contributes to representing the effects of industrialization on the environment and the unease caused by modernization.

=== Economic miracle and sociopolitical satire ===
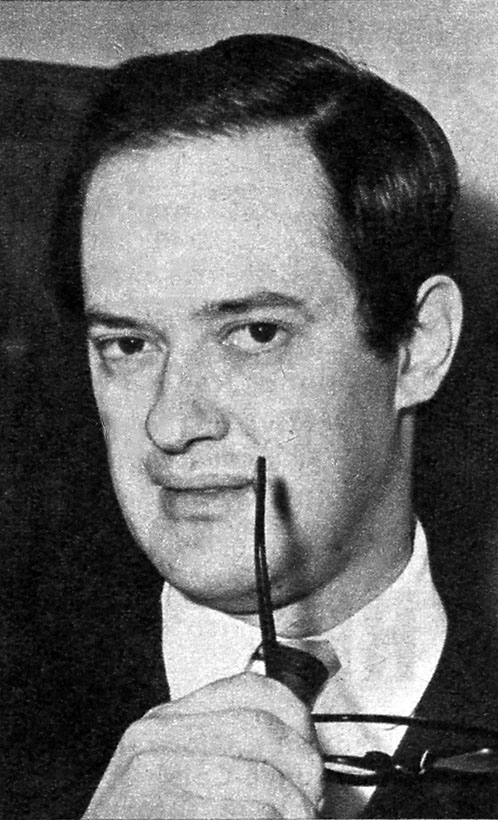
Ugo Gregoretti in 1961, two years before Omicron

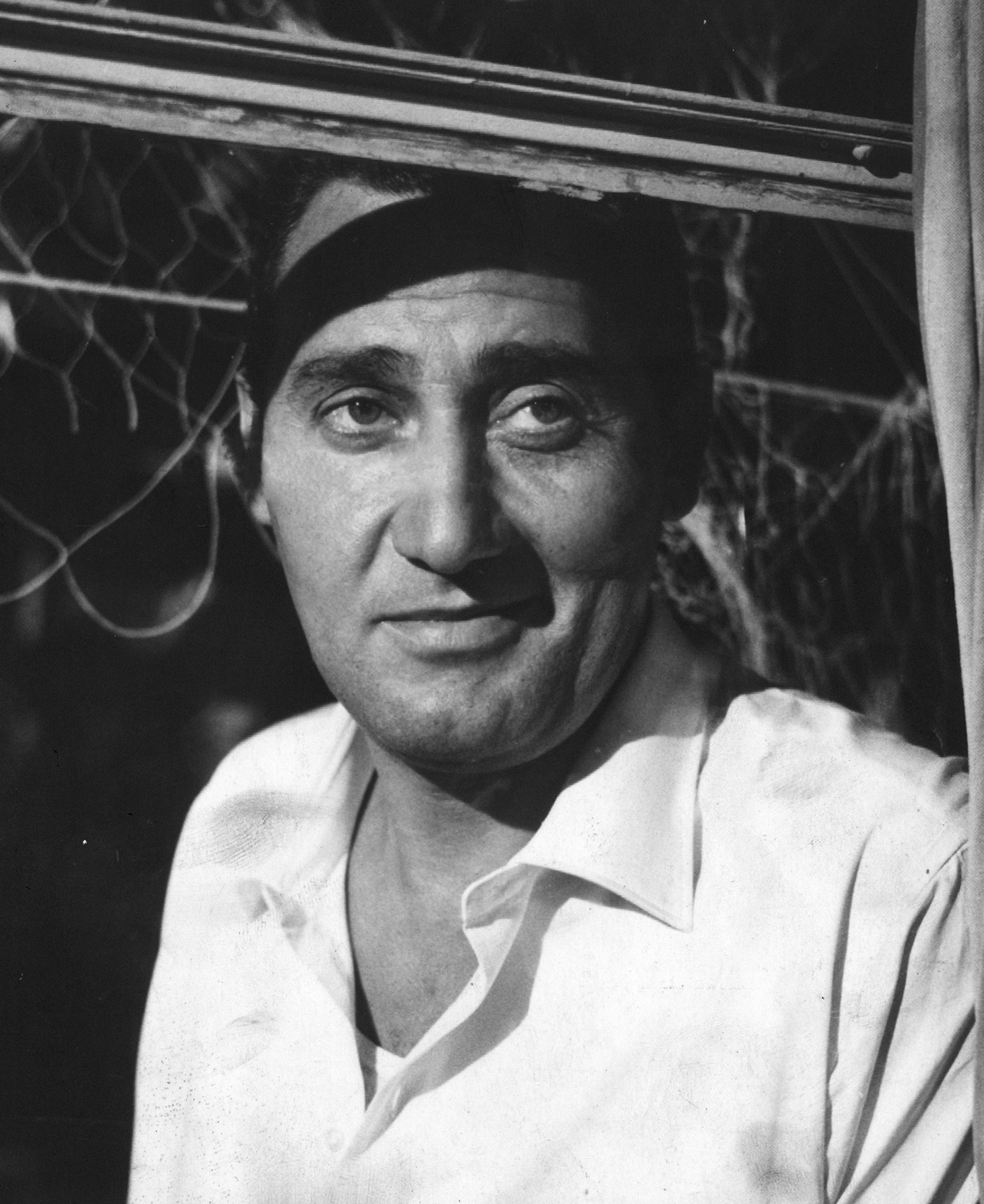
Alberto Sordi, director and star of Io e Caterina (1980)

A precedent of the social strand is Omicron (1963), written and directed by Ugo Gregoretti, in which an alien enters the body of a dead worker and ends up inciting the other workers to strike; the film thus builds a satire of class conflict, making the alien's strangeness coincide with that of the alienated worker, while the Fordist assembly line and hyper-productivity take on a more threatening character than the extraterrestrial invasion, and science fiction becomes the means to criticize the social transformations of the Italian economic miracle. Il disco volante (internationally released as The Flying Saucer, 1964), directed by Tinto Brass, uses the landing of aliens in a village in the Veneto countryside as the starting point for a grotesque satire of provincial Italy and the narrow-mindedness of the petty bourgeoisie faced with an incomprehensible phenomenon; the satire also targets alcoholism and the absence of morality in the different social classes, from the decadent nobility to the hypocritical and self-righteous bourgeoisie, up to the clergy. The same season includes I marziani hanno 12 mani (1964) by Castellano & Pipolo, in which four Martians arrive on Earth to study its customs and end up confronting the life and consumption of Italy's economic miracle; the film is a science fiction parody with farcical tones.

Finally, The 10th Victim (La decima vittima, 1965) by Elio Petri is loosely based on the short story The Seventh Victim (1953) by Robert Sheckley, included in the anthology The Wonders of the Possible edited by Sergio Solmi and Carlo Fruttero, whose Einaudi edition dates to 1959; starring Marcello Mastroianni and Ursula Andress, the film imagines a Rome of an unspecified future in which, wars having disappeared, aggression is channeled into a legalized manhunt in which the winner reaches ten victims, taking from the story the obligatory passage from the role of hunter to that of victim. In the film the game becomes a television show: the killing of the tenth victim is prepared like a commercial to be broadcast live, thus anticipating a dystopian version of reality TV; the satire simultaneously targets new commodities, "American-style" desires and consumption anxiety, accompanied by references to hard-edge painting and Pop art.

Animation also participates in the same satirical vein with VIP my Brother Superman (Vip – Mio fratello superuomo, 1968) by Bruno Bozzetto, a parody of superheroes and consumerism in which the attempt to conquer the world passes through the suggestions of an electronic brain. The satirical vein resurfaced in 1980 with Io e Caterina, directed and starring Alberto Sordi, where the science fiction element – a robot maid – is at the center of a comic-satirical story; the robot's malfunction arises from the imitation of jealousy and possessive devotion and offers a pessimistic vision of gender relations. The protagonist's male and class privilege also passes through the exploitation of women's work, which however makes him dependent on their domestic and organizational skills; the isolated house accentuates loneliness and becomes a place of control, while the robot imported from the United States does not solve the problems of the Italian male and exposes his privilege to feminist demands.

Colpo di stato is a biting fantapolitical comedy by Luciano Salce that imagines an Italy in which the Communist Party wins the elections instead of the Christian Democracy, triggering panic reactions; opposed by both the right and the left, Salce's film was substantially withdrawn. The supercomputer correctly counts the votes and is introduced in the name of transparency; the satire strikes the inability of men to accept its result.

=== Dystopia and catastrophe ===
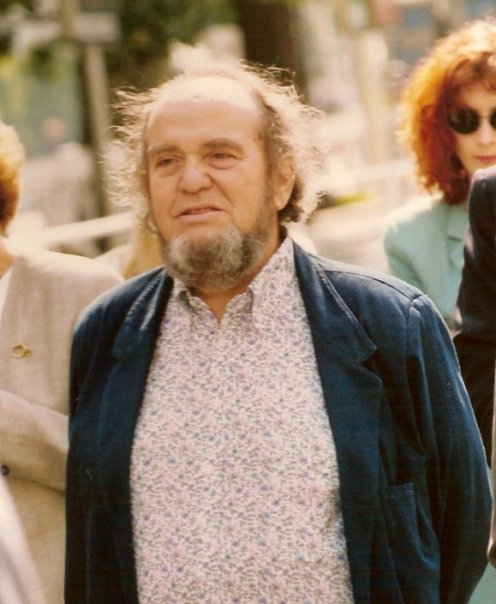
Marco Ferreri, director of The Seed of Man (Il seme dell'uomo, 1969)

In The Seed of Man (Il seme dell'uomo, 1969), the only science fiction feature film by Marco Ferreri, the end of the world takes on an almost metaphysical character: a mysterious "plague" has decimated humanity and the survivors confront the possibility of its extinction; the film belongs to the European art science fiction of the 1960s, which addressed in dystopian form themes such as modernization, family, work, state and revolution. The opening in the motorway restaurant and the subsequent domestic museum of consumer objects transform mass products into useless relics, contrasting their short duration with their long persistence as waste and making the catastrophe also a critique of the logic of consumption.

A post-atomic scenario also characterizes Ecce Homo – I sopravvissuti (1969) by Bruno Gaburro, with Irene Papas and Philippe Leroy and a soundtrack by Ennio Morricone: after a nuclear disaster, a family settles by the sea while the arrival of other survivors cracks its equilibrium; the story replaces the usual struggle to rebuild the world with the doubt about the very opportunity to perpetuate the human species, placing the film among the first Italian examples of the post-nuclear strand.

=== Protest and the fantastic-dystopian ===
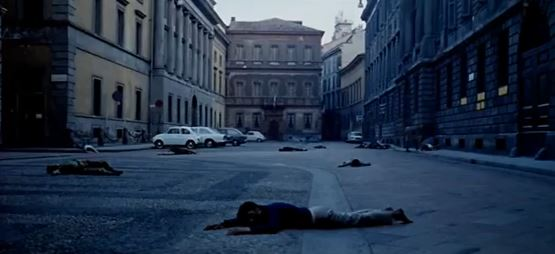
The Year of the Cannibals (I cannibali, 1969) by Liliana Cavani

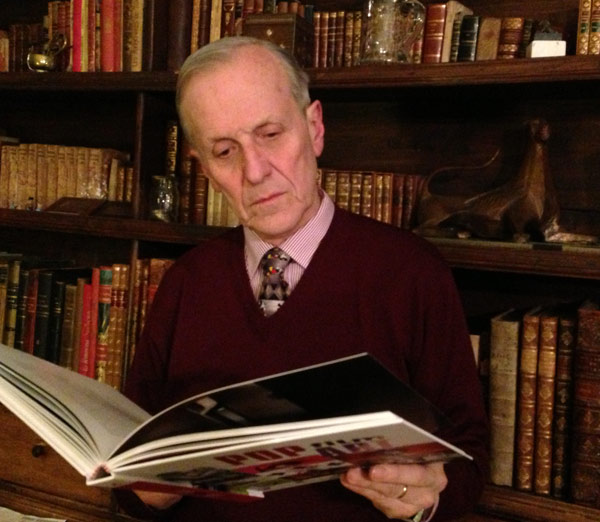
Corrado Farina with the Pardo d'oro won at Locarno for They Have Changed Their Face (...hanno cambiato faccia, 1971)

Between the late 1960s and the 1970s some Italian fantastic and dystopian films relied above all on technology and sexuality to question the hopes of social and political change widespread in the left of the time, bringing into art science fiction themes present in contemporary political debate. The film H2S (1969) by Roberto Faenza tells of the young protagonist's rebellion against a technocratic and consumerist society, to the point of planting a bomb, with a soundtrack by Ennio Morricone. H2S provoked a harsh reaction from censorship, was seized and involved in legal proceedings, being distributed only in 1971. Public screening received a favorable opinion with a ban for minors under 14. As in Corrado Farina's 1971 film ...hanno cambiato faccia, science fiction serves above all to express an openly anti-capitalist social and political critique; in the same year the film won a Golden Leopard reserved for second works at the Locarno Film Festival.

Eat It (1969) by Francesco Casaretti also mixes black fable and science fiction in a grotesque satire of advertising and the reduction of the individual to merchandise, close to Faenza's early films and partly anticipating Marcello Aliprandi's La ragazza di latta and ...hanno cambiato faccia; based on a story by Roberto Leoni, the film marks the debut of Paolo Villaggio and features a soundtrack by Ennio Morricone and over-the-top sets by Giorgio Giovannini (art director also in Roberto Faenza's Escalation). The offices of the producing company are instead minimalist, technologically advanced and automated; Eat it is a new type of gelatinous brown canned meat.

Il tunnel sotto il mondo, the directorial debut of Luigi Cozzi, later one of the main figures of Italian science fiction cinema, was presented in 1969 at the International Science Fiction Film Festival of Trieste; it is an experimental film inspired by the 1955 short story of the same name by Frederik Pohl, a classic of consumerism satire, in which an entire community is held prisoner by advertising researchers. The Year of the Cannibals (I cannibali, 1969) by Liliana Cavani relocates Sophocles' Antigone to Milan, in an unspecified but near future, connecting the myth to the 1968 protest and entrusting the force of change to young people rather than to ideology; family, prison and psychiatric hospital become places of control and repression, while the ending keeps the political force of rebellion alive even after the protagonists' death.

Social unease is again the protagonist in N.P. – Il segreto (1971) by Silvano Agosti, with Irene Papas and Francisco Rabal: the story of an inventor who is deprived of his industry by the government and socially degraded, discovering that the machines he invented and conceived as instruments of progress are used instead to systematically eliminate opponents of the regime and the "superfluous"; like H2S, the film restates the libertarian ideas of 1968 in science fiction form.

In the 1975 film The Sex Machine (Conviene far bene l'amore, 1975) by Pasquale Festa Campanile, a future civilization grappling with the energy crisis discovers the system of drawing energy from sexual intercourse, making it an obligation; it is a film close to the erotic comedy, born in the climate of the 1973 oil crisis and the consequent austerity measures, which reworks Reichian theories in a paradoxical way. Ugo Tognazzi finally tackled sociological science fiction, this time as director, in I viaggiatori della sera (1979), an art film based on the novel of the same name by Umberto Simonetta, set in a dystopian future that no longer tolerates the condition of old age and the elderly, who must participate in a "Great Game" that sooner or later decrees their physical elimination.

=== Experimental cinema ===
Mario Schifano, author of Umano, non umano (1969)

In Italian experimental cinema science fiction does not form an autonomous genre: it arises rather from the use of the camera, video and digital techniques to make images of everyday life strange or alien. In Umano, non umano (1969) by Mario Schifano, the burnt film and the final image of the television produce this sense of estrangement through technique itself, while Cioni Carpi's I will... I shan't builds a mental and non-human journey with animated and abstract images accompanied by mysterious sounds. A similar effect recurs in the video Io mi chiamo Michele e tu? by Michele Sambin, where the video loop multiplies identity until it becomes strange; in Non accaduto (1968) by Gianfranco Baruchello, instead, reproduction technologies serve to work on time, absence and the sense of estrangement.

=== Sexual liberation and existential fantastic ===
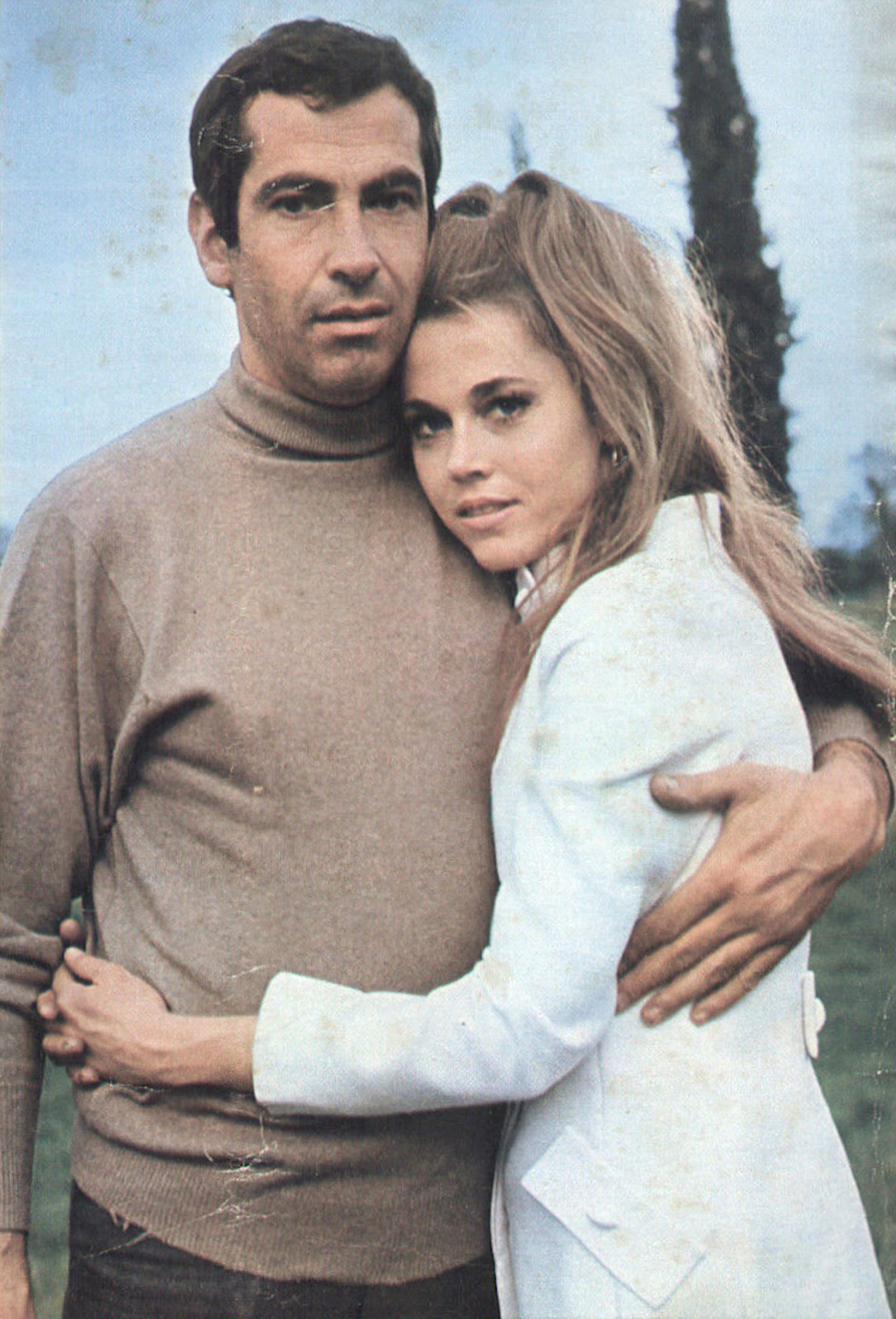
Roger Vadim and Jane Fonda in Rome in May 1967; Vadim directed Barbarella (1968) with Fonda in the title role

Between the 1960s and 1970s some science fiction films questioned the roles traditionally attributed to men and women, the couple and the family, while freer sexual behaviors were spreading and the idea that the relationship between man and woman and the traditional family were the only possible models was contested; in the same period art fantastic also tackled existential themes, as in the cinematic debut of Emidio Greco, characterized by architectures both lucid and unreal.

In Omicron (1963) the division of the sexes and sexual intercourse for reproductive purposes are presented by the alien as primitive traits, while Il tunnel sotto il mondo (1969) imagines first a future dominated by women and then an alien world inhabited by a single gender capable of self-reproduction; these motifs express the anxieties aroused by the possible end of binary logic in the climate of sexual liberation. The fourth episode of Marcia nuziale (1966), La famiglia felice, instead brings the crisis of the couple to 1999, where rubber spouses and children replace human relationships; the discourse continues in The Seed of Man (Il seme dell'uomo, 1969), in which the woman's refusal to be reduced to the reproductive role cracks the traditional model of wife and mother and the very continuity of the couple. H2S also plays on the ambiguity between masculine and feminine: after escaping from the totalitarian organization, the protagonist is recaptured and forced to marry the institution's hundred-year-old godmother, played by Paolo Poli; in the finale the godmother prepares the young man for the wedding with a pink blouse, ribbons, bows and a hair clip, bringing to a climax the contrasts between masculine and feminine, old and young, true and false, tragic and comic.

Among the films that most clearly express the pop and sensual aesthetic of the 1960s is the lighthearted Barbarella (1968), a Franco-Italian co-production made by Dino De Laurentiis and directed by Roger Vadim, starring Jane Fonda (who replaced Virna Lisi after she refused the role) and various Italian actors in the cast; inspired by the comic book character of the same name, the plot centers on the fascinating heroine of the remote future and her numerous adventures, including erotic ones. In the film the protagonist's sexuality is freed from the institutions of marriage and family and becomes an expression of personal autonomy integrated into social life.

In The Sex Machine (Conviene far bene l'amore, 1975) sexuality is at the center of a dystopia: sexual intercourse provides energy and thus becomes a productive obligation; technology and sexuality show, in the fantastic-dystopian, the reversal of the utopian hopes of progressive thought with particular evidence.

Morel's Invention (L'invenzione di Morel, 1974) by Emidio Greco, the director's cinematic debut and adaptation of the novel of the same name by Adolfo Bioy Casares, instead tackles the fantastic in existential terms through cinematic architectures both lucid and unreal, while the circular repetition of images produces a disturbing effect. The film tells of the relationship between life, death and the desire for immortality through the machine invented by the title character: a castaway finds himself on an island where no one apparently notices his existence and everyone ends up repeating the same gestures and speeches as in an infinite cycle, produced by a machine capable of recording and reproducing integrally what is perceived by the senses but deadly for the recorded subjects. The machine thus offers a form of immortality entrusted to images, while the support of industrialists and the first lethal tests conducted on employees without their consent also introduce a social and political critique.

== Festivals, retrospectives and television ==
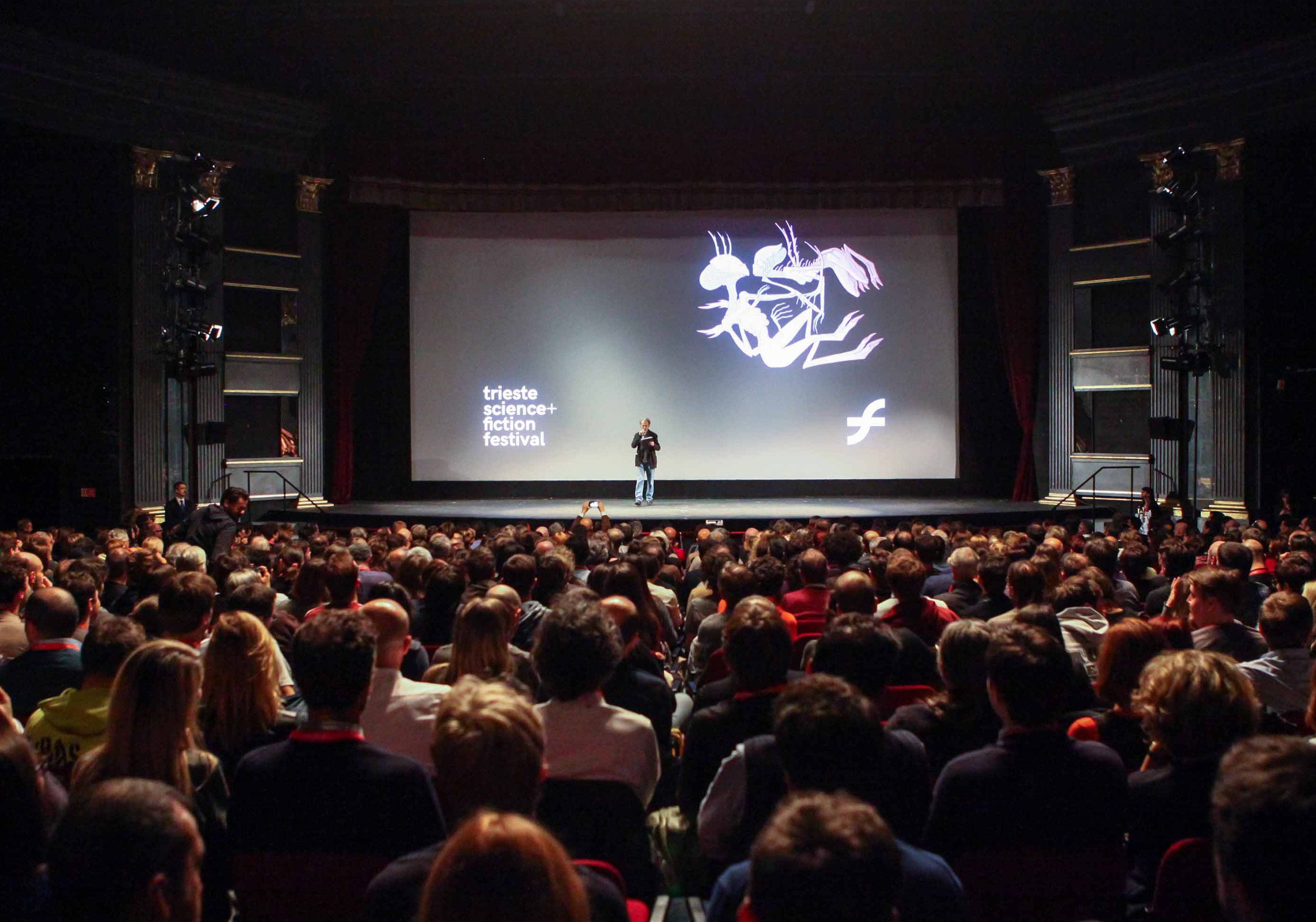
The Trieste Science+Fiction Festival in 2016

From the 1960s, specialized festivals and retrospectives offered science fiction cinema opportunities for screening and discussion when genre films were still difficult to see; television also contributed to making them known through retrospectives and dedicated programming.

In 1963 the International Science Fiction Film Festival was born in Trieste, the first festival event in the world dedicated to science fiction cinema; over a twenty-year period, the event also contributed to defining the study of the film genre, while the first edition was inaugurated on 6 July at the San Giusto Castle and the project originated from a group of science fiction writers and experts including Giulio Raiola, Sandro Sandrelli and Piero Zanotto, joined from the outset by collaborators of the Venice Film Festival such as Gastone Schiavotto and Flavia Paulon. The Trieste festival took place in the climate of the space race: some editions coincided with the 1969 Moon landing, the Apollo 15 mission of 1971 and the Apollo-Soyuz rendezvous of 1975, while science fiction writers such as Brian Aldiss and Arthur C. Clarke participated in juries and conferences.

Television offered another possibility to see genre films, with a RAI retrospective dedicated to a selection of science fiction films as early as the early 1960s. On the occasion of the Apollo 11 Moon landing (1969), RAI for the first time filled its schedule with science fiction films during the "night of the Moon" and in the days preceding the mission; on the Programma Nazionale channel it also organized 25 hours on the Moon, the first RAI television marathon, following live the different phases of the Moon landing.

In the 1970s specialized retrospectives also developed outside Trieste. Luigi Cozzi and Ugo Malaguti organized in 1975 at the Planetario cinema in Rome a retrospective dedicated exclusively to science fiction cinema; initially planned for two weeks, it lasted three months and was repeated elsewhere in Italy, particularly at the Tevere film club in Rome, an initiative from which the Fantafestival later derived. In the capital, the annual aerospace technology exhibition held at the Palazzo dei Congressi already included screenings of science fiction films. The Trieste festival screenings were interrupted in 1982 for lack of funding; in 2000 La Cappella Underground inherited its legacy by founding the Trieste Science+Fiction Festival, adding conferences, debates and initiatives also dedicated to comics, literature and music to the screenings.

== Space opera and science fiction horror between the 1970s and 1980s ==
At the end of the 1970s the success of Star Wars (1977) by George Lucas relaunched the space adventure strand and imposed a blockbuster model also based on the extensive use of special effects, consolidating the dominance of the United States in this market.

=== Space opera after Star Wars ===
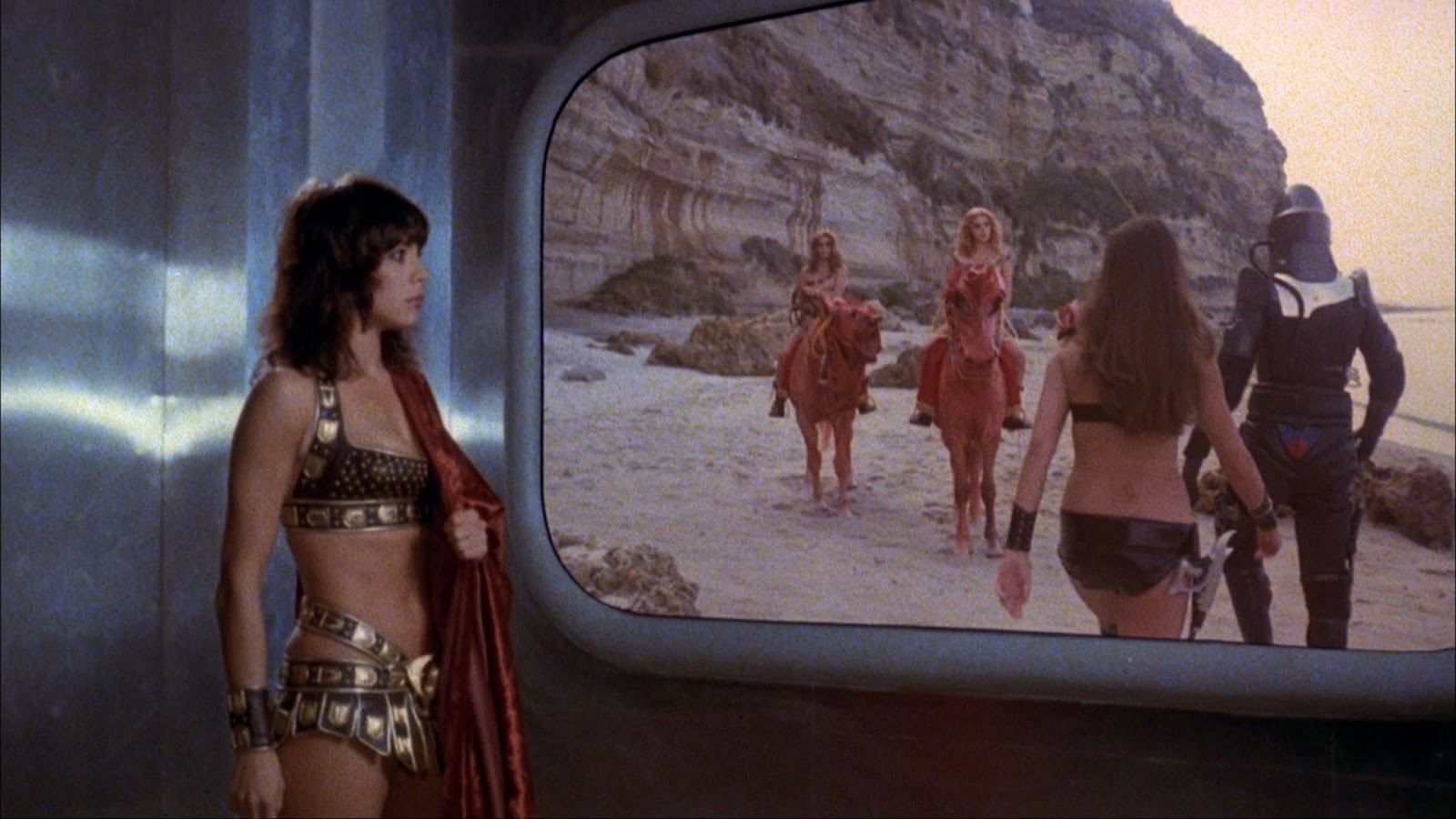
Starcrash (Scontri stellari oltre la terza dimensione, 1978) by Luigi Cozzi

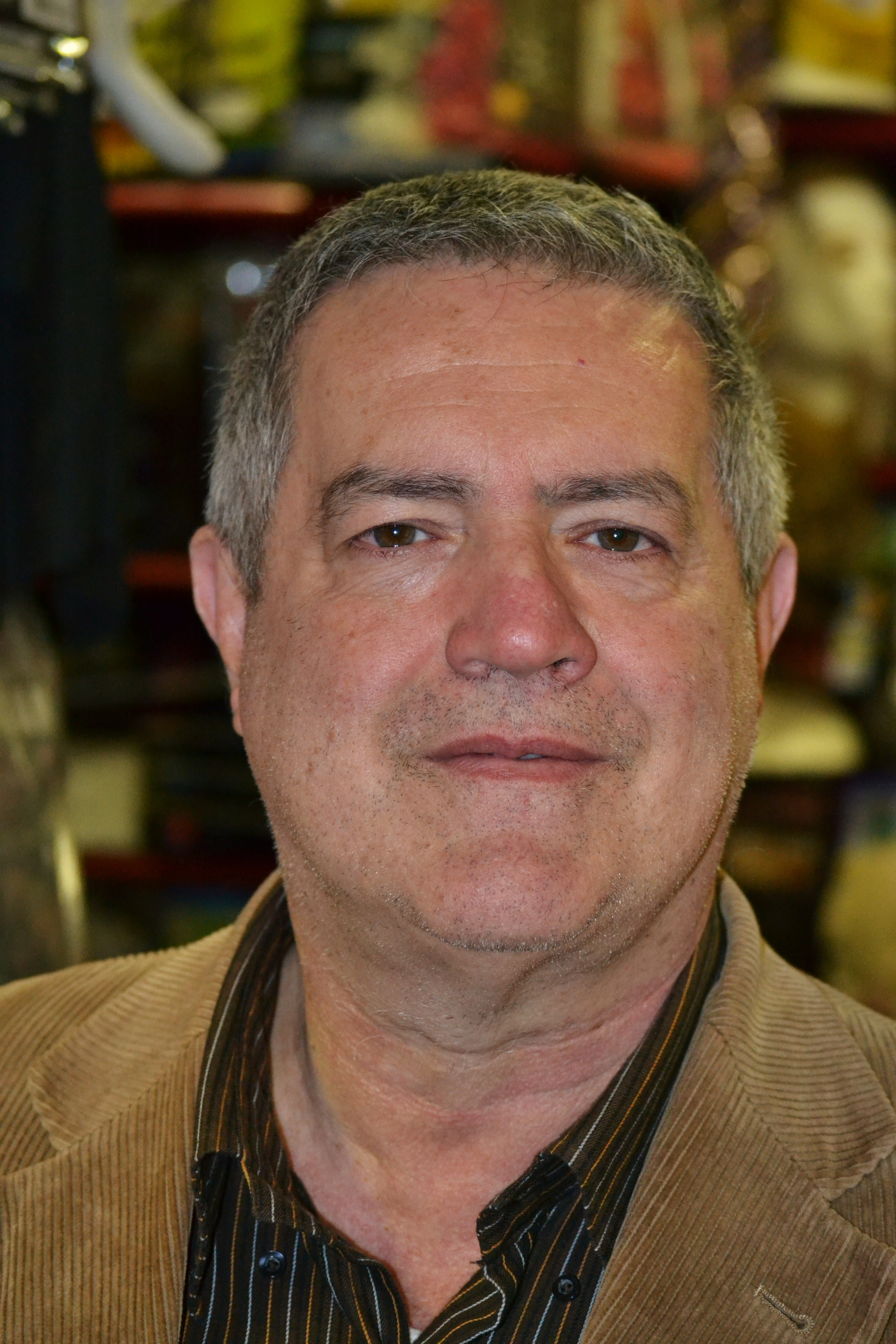
Luigi Cozzi, director of Starcrash (1978) and Contamination (1980)

In Italy, the revival of space adventure was followed above all by low-budget productions and co-productions also aimed at the international market.

Between 1977 and 1980 the director Alfonso Brescia, under the pseudonym Al Bradley, made a series of five low-budget films – Cosmos: War of the Planets (Anno zero – Guerra nello spazio, 1977), Cosmo 2000 – Battaglie negli spazi stellari (1978), War of the Robots (La guerra dei robot, 1978), Star Odyssey (Sette uomini d'oro nello spazio, 1979) and La bestia nello spazio (1980) – building a saga of space adventures in the wake of Star Wars, made by reusing part of the cast, sets and special effects; distributed in the United States and Europe, by 2018 the five films were largely forgotten. Cosmos: War of the Planets has also been included among the worst science fiction films, with criticism directed in particular at plot, dialogue and acting.

The Italian director Luigi Cozzi made in 1978 (under the name Lewis Coates) Starcrash (Scontri stellari oltre la terza dimensione, 1978), an Italian-American co-production considered a cult film and publicized, one year after Star Wars, as the Italian response to Lucas's great success; although a low-budget film compared to major Hollywood productions, the cast includes Christopher Plummer. Although, because of its title, Cozzi's film has often been seen as a "cheap remake" (or camp) of Star Wars, the plot has only superficial similarities with Lucas's masterpiece and cites numerous other classics of the genre starting from those of the 1930s and 1940s. Among the recognizable references in the film are Barbarella, Perry Rhodan and the Flash Gordon serials of the 1930s and 1940s, as well as intentional homages to the work of Ray Harryhausen. The film's humor and irony also take up the informal and participatory atmosphere of the science fiction retrospectives organized by Cozzi in the 1970s; Starcrash has thus been read less as an attempt to exploit Star Wars than as a way of bringing the experience of those retrospectives to the screen.

The Humanoid (L'umanoide, 1979), by Aldo Lado, continues the Italian space science fiction strand of the period. In a future following nuclear wars, a scientist searches for the Kappatron, a force capable of transforming human beings into indestructible "humanoids", testing the procedure on a pilot. In international productions, Dino De Laurentiis continued his activity in the fantastic and science fiction by producing Flash Gordon (1980) and carrying forward the development of Dune (1984) by David Lynch, an American film produced by Raffaella De Laurentiis, after Dino De Laurentiis had purchased the rights in 1979. In 2001 the producer also received the Irving G. Thalberg Memorial Award, relative to the year 2000.

In 1987 space adventure returned in a production born for television and subsequently re-edited and distributed as a film: Antonio Margheriti shot for Rai, faithfully following a project by the late Renato Castellani, the television miniseries Treasure Island in Outer Space (L'isola del tesoro, 1987), a science fiction adaptation of Robert Louis Stevenson's novel set in space. Co-produced by Raidue, Bavaria Film and TF1, the miniseries was shot with an international cast. The production had extensive means at its disposal, with a cost of over 25 billion lire and a considerable production effort supported by Rai, without however achieving the hoped-for success and being judged severely by critics, especially for the narrative rhythm, judged at first too slow and then precipitous; it was nevertheless distributed abroad in versions of different durations and subsequent re-edits. The work combines spaceships, laser weapons and androids with elements of a still recognizable past; the android, although belonging to a society born after a war between humans and robots, behaves courageously and altruistically and shows emotions.

=== Science fiction horror between foreign models and Italian Gothic ===
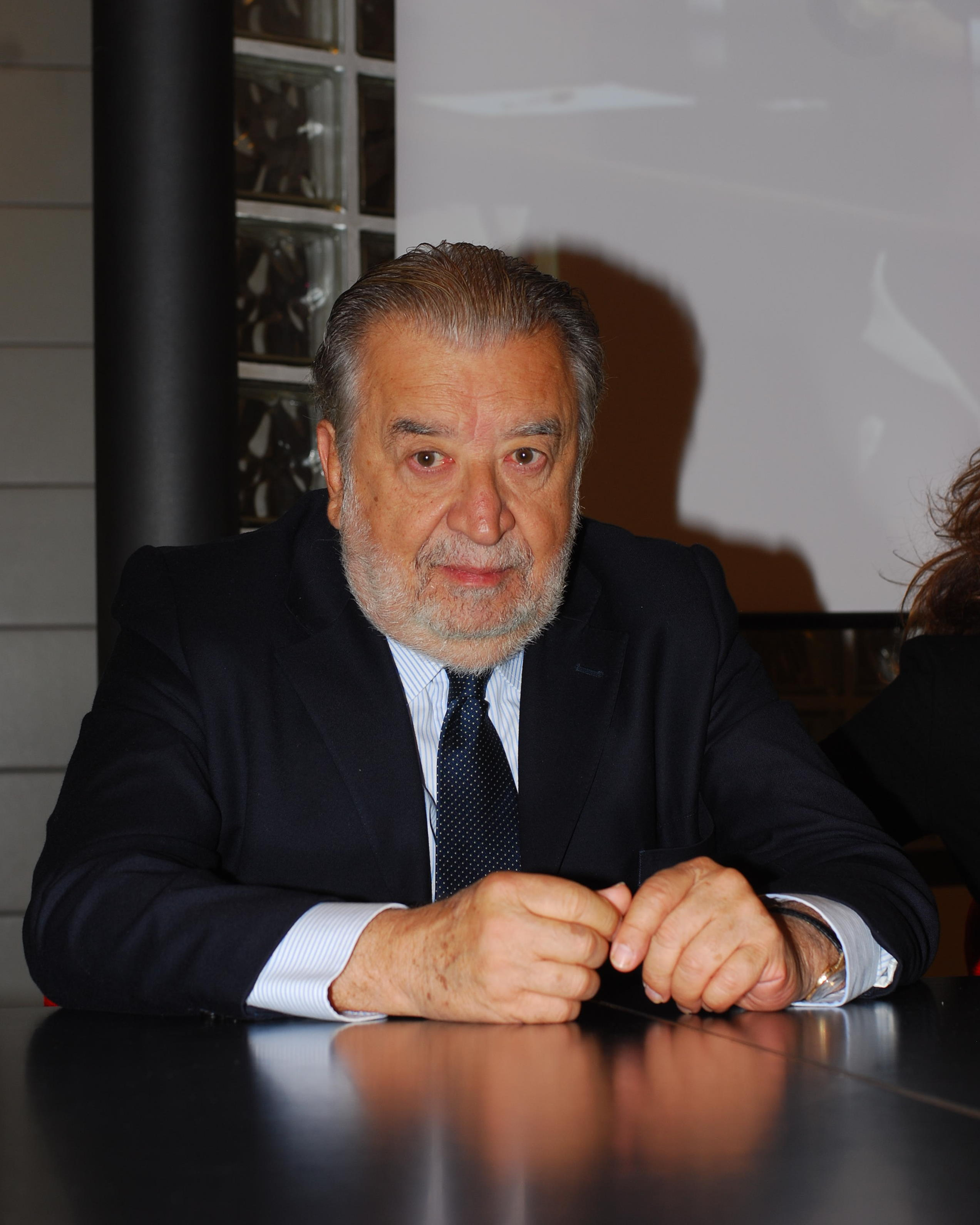
Pupi Avati, director of Zeder (1983)

Between the late 1970s and early 1980s several Italian science fiction horror films took up already established foreign models, while Zeder represented one of the few attempts to develop a specifically Italian Gothic and stood out for originality. Among these models there is also an Italian precedent: Planet of the Vampires (Terrore nello spazio, 1965) by Mario Bava has been indicated as an antecedent of Alien (1979), which in turn became the model for Contamination.

Island of the Fishmen (L'isola degli uomini pesce, 1979) is a science fiction horror film directed by Sergio Martino, in which a biologist has created fish-men, amphibious beings employed to recover a submerged treasure of Atlantis; the film seems inspired by The Island of Dr. Moreau (1977) by Don Taylor, a film that proved a failure and was in turn a slow and trite remake of Island of Lost Souls (1932).

The success of Alien generated in Italy several attempts to take up its formula. Cozzi wrote and directed in 1980 his last science fiction film, Contamination (1980), a science fiction horror that follows the alien invasion model while building its story out of further references: the opening recalls Zombi 2, while numerous elements derive from Quatermass 2 (1957). In the same year Alien 2: On Earth (Alien 2 – Sulla Terra, 1980), directed by Ciro Ippolito under the pseudonym Sam Cromwell, is an unofficial sequel made to capitalize on the commercial success of Scott's film, shot with very poor means and characterized by an artisanal and gory approach between science fiction and horror; the film was also accused of plagiarism.

With Zeder (1983) Pupi Avati instead followed a different path: in the science fiction horror, set in Emilia-Romagna, alchemical and esoteric, pseudoscientific and conspiracy film elements revolve around a particular type of soil that seems capable of making the dead resurrect. The title character was modeled on the figure of the alchemist and esotericist Fulcanelli, whose life and works Avati had studied for a previous project. Although featuring the dead returned to life, the film rejects the traditional iconography of zombies and explicit gore, privileging suspense, anguish and a conspiracy film atmosphere, while the experiments on the return of the dead are presented in pseudoscientific terms through cameras and monitors, used instead of traditional séances.

== The post-atomic and the new barbarians ==
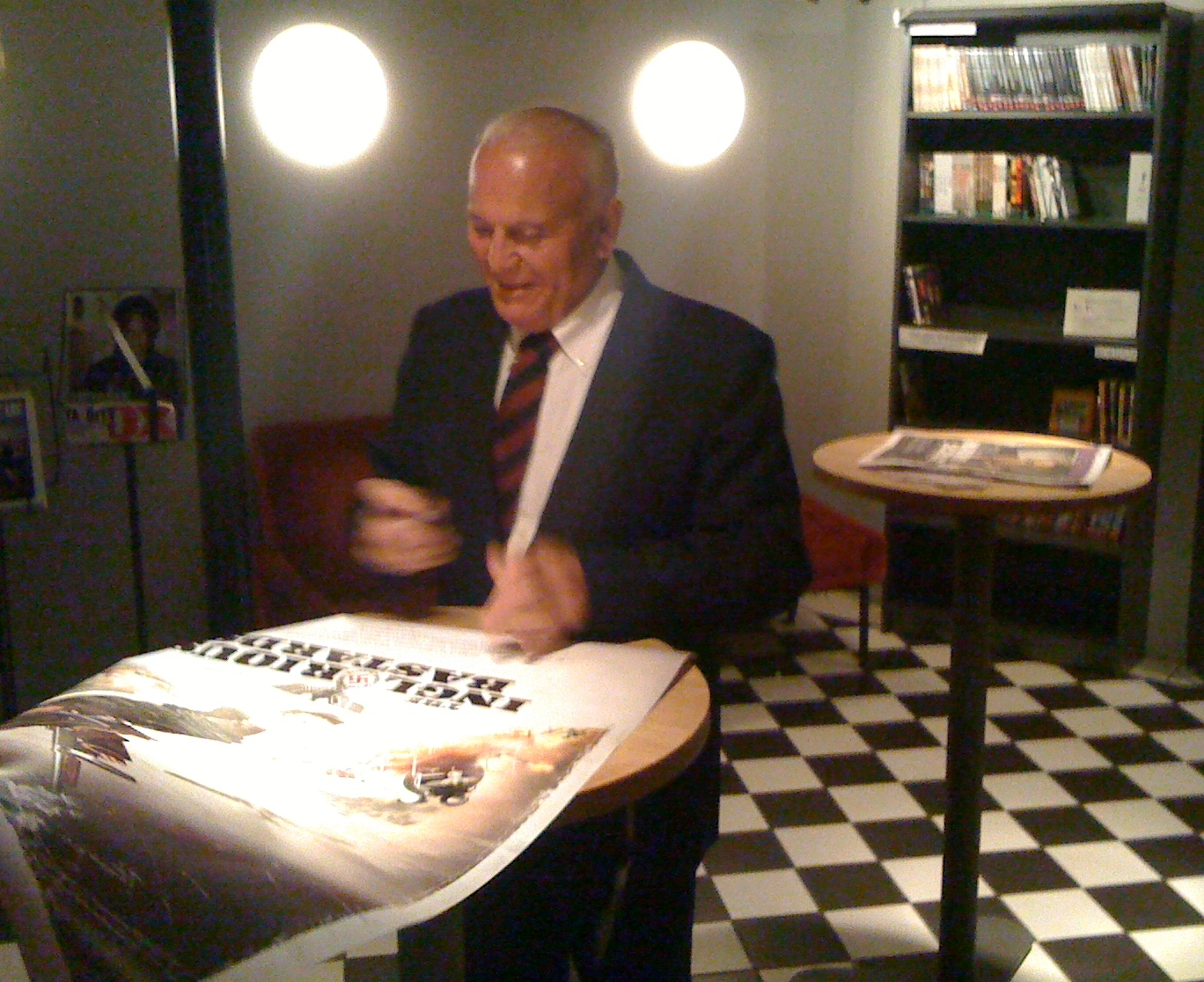
Enzo G. Castellari, director of the trilogy formed by 1990: The Bronx Warriors, The New Barbarians and Escape from the Bronx

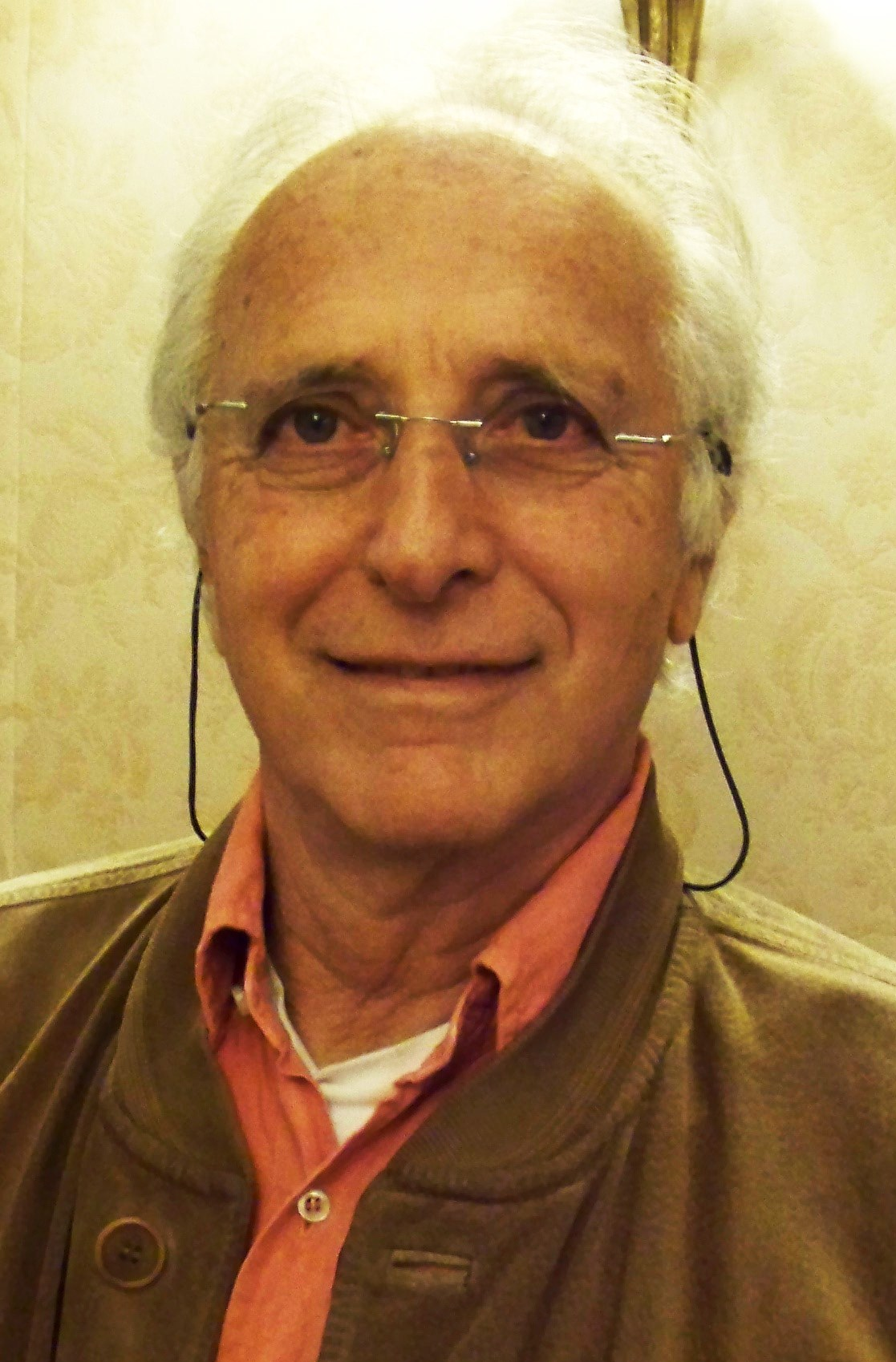
Ruggero Deodato, director of The Atlantis Interceptors (I predatori di Atlantide, 1983)

In the first half of the 1980s a short cycle of post-apocalyptic films developed in Italy, born from the tendency of genre cinema to respond rapidly to international successes and inspired above all by the Australian films Mad Max (1979) and Mad Max 2 (1981), by Escape from New York (1981) and by the image of anarchy and violence in metropolitan ghettos proposed by The Warriors (1979); the cycle was heterogeneous and included cities devastated by nuclear war and pollution, territories dominated by gangs or authoritarian powers and protagonists who also recalled the tradition of the peplum. The Italian productions transformed abandoned industrial plants and other desolate landscapes of the peninsula into cheap but effective sets to describe, in a regressed civilization, the battles of the last survivors of atomic war.

The urban side of the cycle includes the trilogy by Enzo G. Castellari formed by 1990: The Bronx Warriors (1990 – I guerrieri del Bronx, 1982), The New Barbarians (I nuovi barbari, 1983) and Escape from the Bronx (Fuga dal Bronx, 1983), together with 2019, After the Fall of New York (2019 – Dopo la caduta di New York, 1983) by Sergio Martino, also from 1983 and signed by the director under the pseudonym Martin Dolman. Among these, The New Barbarians had American distribution, while 1990: The Bronx Warriors had strong success in the United States and remained for weeks in fifth place in the American chart published by Variety. Escape from the Bronx had great success in several countries.

Among the productions of the same period, Endgame (Endgame – Bronx lotta finale, 1983), made by Aristide Massaccesi under the pseudonym Steven Benson and considered one of the director's most ambitious films, stands out for its ability to fuse different themes; Massaccesi (better known as Joe D'Amato) made it in the phase in which, like other Italian filmmakers, he was taking up major American successes, with Escape from New York as a direct model. Also part of the same strand is 2020 Texas Gladiators (Anno 2020 – I gladiatori del futuro, 1984), credited to Kevin Mancuso (Aristide Massaccesi), while George Eastman (Luigi Montefiori) assisted Massaccesi in the direction. Distributed internationally in 1984 as 2020 Texas Gladiators, the film is a post-apocalyptic exploitation in which, after a sequence of violence, the heroes kill those responsible as a form of retributive justice.

The strand also includes films that combine the post-atomic with adventure or the western, or make television control the center of the dystopia. In the same 1983 The Atlantis Interceptors (I predatori di Atlantide, 1983) by Ruggero Deodato combines the violent adventure of the strand with an explicit science fiction element: during the recovery of a sunken Soviet nuclear submarine, nuclear radiation causes the re-emergence of Atlantis. Exterminators of the Year 3000 (Il giustiziere della strada, 1983), by Giuliano Carnimeo, is set in the year 3000 and is an apocalyptic dystopia that draws on both the Mad Max exploitation films and the Spaghetti Western, replacing horses and pistols with cars and modified weapons. Antonio Margheriti also tackled this strand with Yor, the Hunter from the Future (Il mondo di Yor, 1983), co-produced by RAI and based on the Argentine comic Yor, the Hunter by Juan Zanotto and Ray Collins, set in an apparently primitive world marked by an atomic catastrophe, where prehistoric monsters, Stone Age men, ape-like creatures and members of an almost extinct superior civilization coexist. The film is an action and adventure work in which the director mixes different genres. The theatrical version was distributed in the United States by RCA Columbia and entered the top ten of the American box office chart. The prehistoric monsters were built life-size and animated by operators hidden inside them.

Lucio Fulci, with Warriors of the Year 2072 (I guerrieri dell'anno 2072, 1983), presents instead a future society controlled by television, in which the main networks fight by any means to dominate ratings, willing to organize a ruthless fight between gladiators to entertain the public. The film stands out from much of the cycle because it does not start from a nuclear war and places the dystopia in a future Rome rather than in the United States; the televised gladiatorial competition has been read as a critique of the power of large television groups, of authoritarianism and of the political and economic transformations of 1980s Italy.

== The second half of the 1980s and the crisis ==
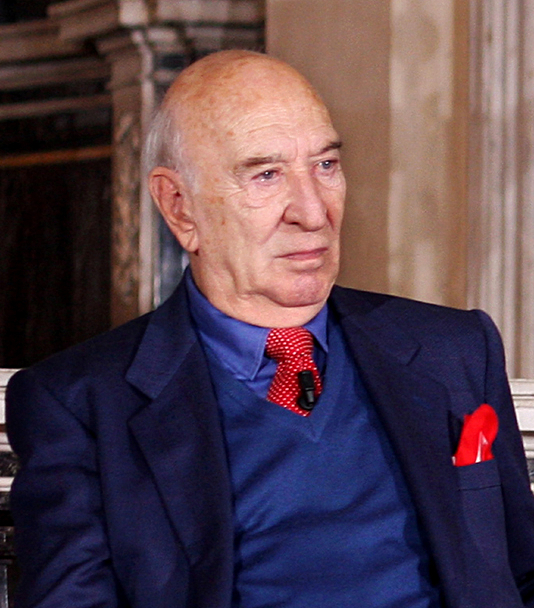
Giuliano Montaldo, director of Control (Il giorno prima, 1987)

In the second half of the 1980s Italian action science fiction developed while genre cinema was going through a wider crisis, with reduced means, few American models of reference and a growing weight of television and home video. In these years the international success of The Terminator and RoboCop fueled a series of low- and very low-budget films centered on androids, cyborgs and time travel. In Vendetta dal futuro (internationally released as Hands of Steel, 1986) by Sergio Martino the protagonist is rebuilt with steel and electronic components, programmed to kill but still capable of retaining human traits; in Robowar (Robowar – Robot da guerra, 1988) Bruno Mattei wanted instead to fuse elements of Predator and RoboCop, while Cyborg - Il guerriero d'acciaio (1989) by Giannetto De Rossi has an android as its protagonist.

In the same period Control (Il giorno prima, 1987) by Giuliano Montaldo instead tackled the nuclear threat through an experiment on human reactions: fifteen volunteers are locked for twenty days in a nuclear fallout shelter, where forced coexistence puts their physical and psychological reactions to the test. Conceived and written by Piero Angela, the film builds the experiment around the behavior of a representative sample of society in conditions of isolation.

Towards the end of the decade Italian genre production progressively lost momentum: the crisis of theaters and the new role of television networks changed the production system, while low-budget films faced growing competition and an increasingly wide technical gap compared to major American productions. The 1980s closed with Alien from the Deep (Alien degli abissi, 1989), the last dramatic science fiction film directed by Antonio Margheriti and a science fiction horror with ecologist themes: the threat to Earth this time arises from polluting human activities, with a company dumping nuclear waste into a volcano and attracting an alien creature with the radioactivity. The film also follows the model of Alien, especially in the idea of the monster and in the echo of the titles, while the director's projects for other films to be made in the 1990s remained unrealized due to the crisis that hit the sector.

== The 1990s ==
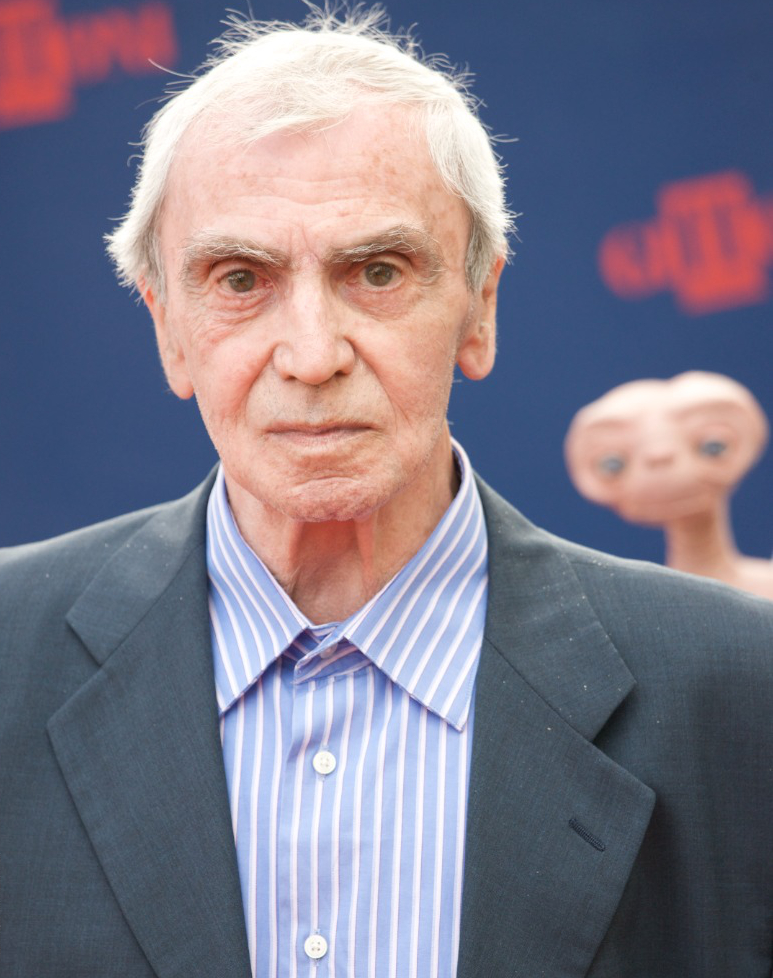
The special effects creator three-time Academy Award winner Carlo Rambaldi (Giffoni Film Festival 2010)

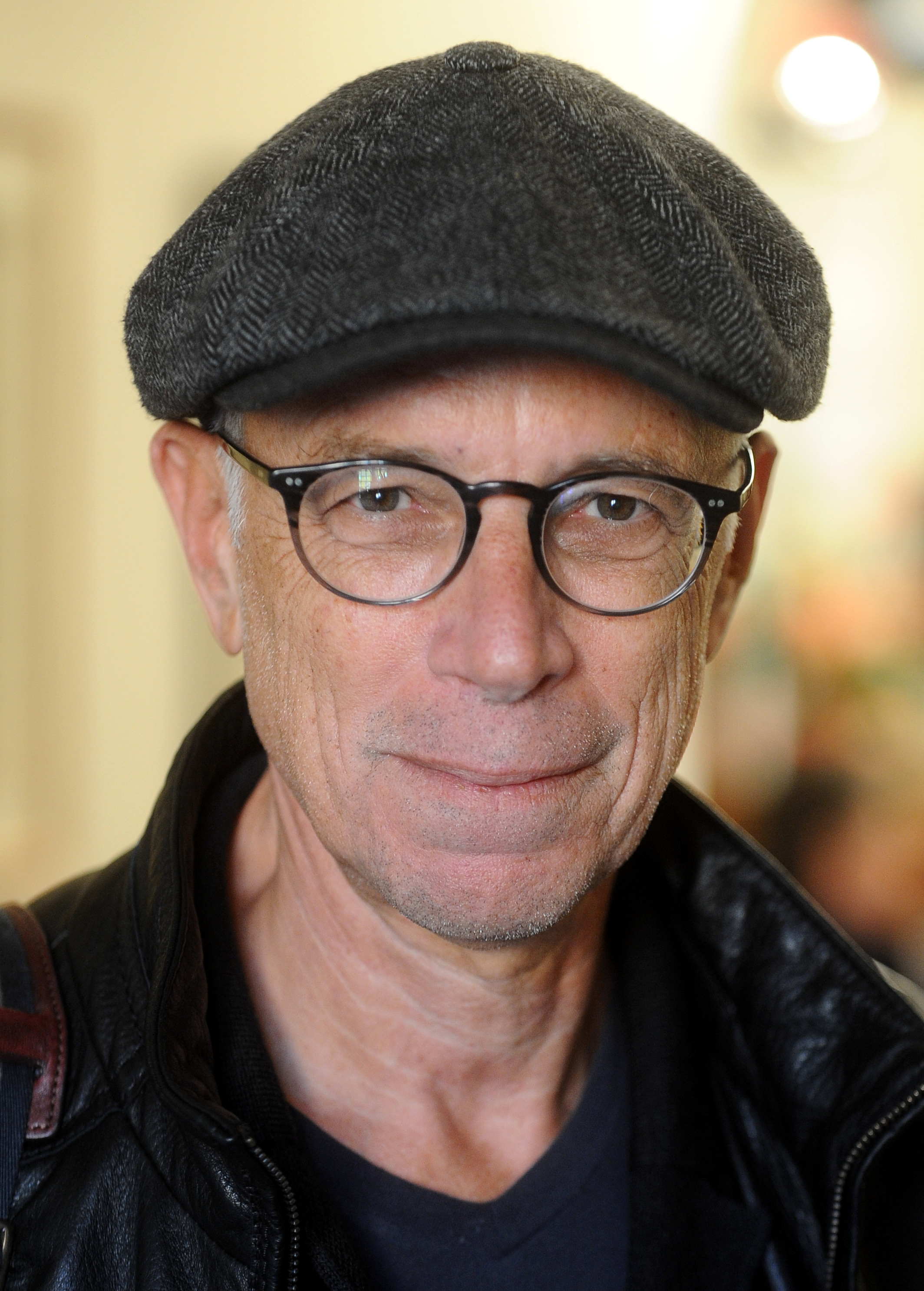
Gabriele Salvatores, director of Nirvana (1997)

In the 1990s the tendency, developed in the previous decade, to make Italian science fiction films destined for the international public came to an end; in the now much reduced production, comedy and farce aimed at the domestic market continued above all; in this context Nirvana (1997) by Gabriele Salvatores stands out clearly, the most notable exception of the decade.

Among the comedies, A spasso nel tempo (1996) by Carlo Vanzina is a 1996 "cinepanettone" that uses time travel as the engine of comic situations and achieved strong success on the Italian market. In 1997 Vanzina directed its sequel A spasso nel tempo – L'avventura continua (1997), which keeps the same protagonists, structure and narrative tone, maintaining the time machine breakdown as the engine of the story. At the end of the decade, the comedy Fantozzi 2000 – La clonazione (1999) by Domenico Saverni brings the protagonist back to life through a cloning procedure and ends with the encounter with a Martian.

Among the science fiction productions of the decade, Nirvana has been defined as the swan song of the genre. It is an Italian-French co-production with an international cast, characterized by the massive use of computer-generated special effects. Set in a near future and shot almost entirely in the Portello district of Milan, in the old Alfa Romeo factories transformed for the occasion into a gigantic film set, the film presents atmospheres of urban decay that recall those of Blade Runner (1982) by Ridley Scott and combines typical elements of cyberpunk – hackers as protagonists, the domination of mega-corporations, the degraded sprawl-periphery and cyberspace – with themes of Buddhist philosophy. The protagonist, played by Christopher Lambert, is a successful video game programmer of virtual reality who discovers how, through a virus, the character of his latest game, played by Diego Abatantuono, has acquired self-awareness; aware of being a prisoner of a life-death cycle in which he is condemned to repeat every action endlessly, the character begs the programmer to free him by deleting all copies of the video game, while the search unfolds in the most degraded peripheries and leads the protagonist back on the trail of the beloved woman he had lost. Although a science fiction film, Nirvana returns to motifs that recur in Salvatores's cinema, especially escape and male friendship, linking them to the gap between rich and poor areas and to the achievement of self-awareness. The film achieved considerable success both in Italy and abroad, while critics were divided, appreciating the ambition to tackle the fantastic, the scenographic spaces, color and camera movements but criticizing the gap between voluntarism and inspiration and the way in which the narrative materials were organized, with other judgments that underlined its spectacularity, involvement and the originality with which it reworked suggestions drawn from cybernetic literature and essays. Nirvana was Salvatores's greatest commercial success and has been described as the greatest audience success in the history of Italian science fiction cinema.

In the decade other films were released, without the previous production aimed at international markets returning. Jackpot (1992) by Mario Orfini proved instead to be a costly failure; built as an anti-technological fable, favorable to a return to nature, it was harshly panned by critics and remained the last cinematic appearance of Adriano Celentano. Antonio Margheriti returned one last time as director in 1997 with Virtual Weapon (Potenza virtuale, 1997), a science fiction and crime comedy in which a detective investigates a criminal network that uses explosives activated by ultrasound and, after an attack, survives in holographic form through a computer.

== The 2000s ==
In the 2000s independent productions and those made by fans gained prominence, some of which achieved high quality; in the same period comedy and farce aimed mainly at the domestic market continued and, in some cases, humor also served to criticize contemporary Italian politics.

=== Independent productions and digital ===
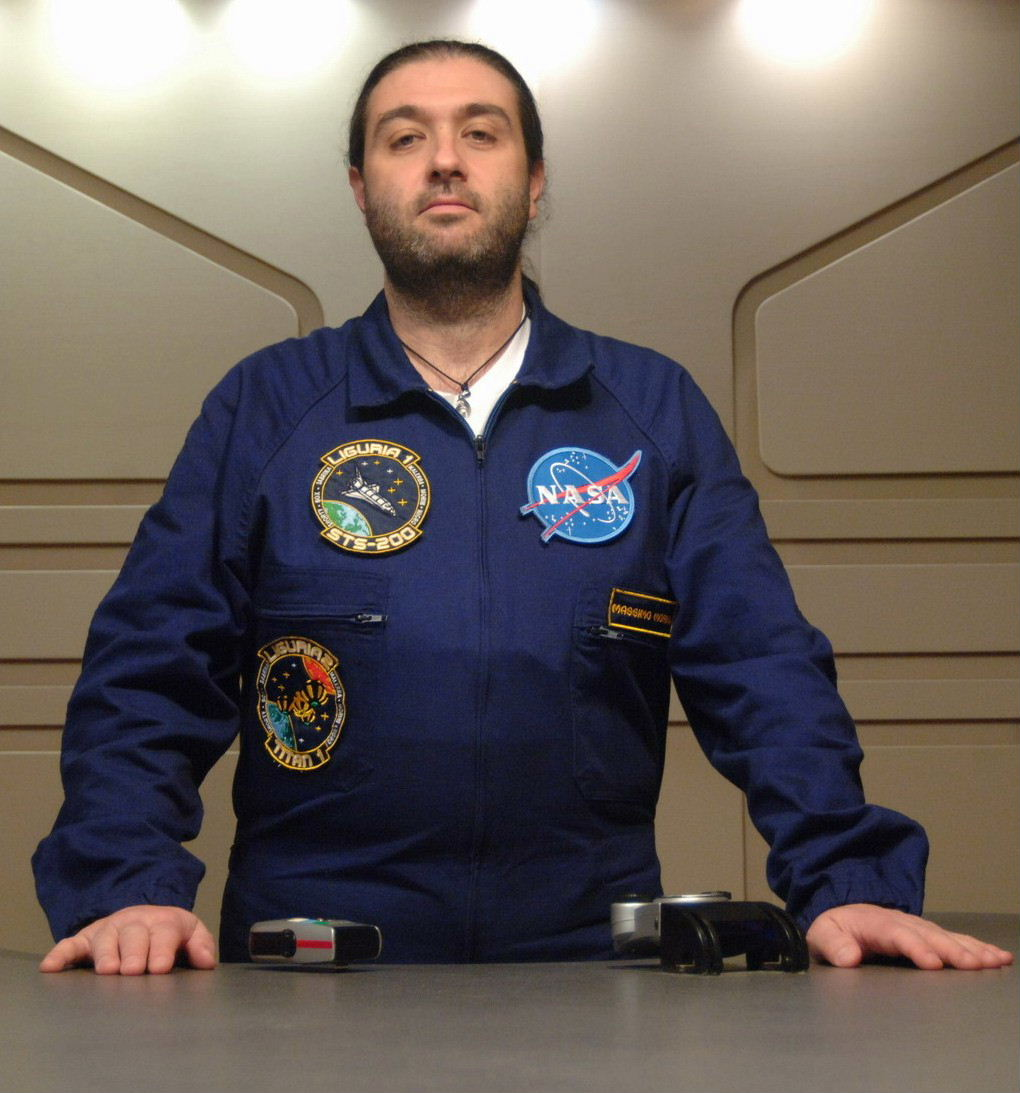
Massimo Morini on the set of InvaXön – Alieni in Liguria (2004)

Digital technologies made it possible to contain some production costs and expanded the ways of distributing and viewing films, including through home video and the internet, offering new possibilities to productions made with reduced means. Among the independent experiences started already at the end of the 1990s was the work of Mariano Equizzi: short films such as Syrena (1998) and AgentZ (2000) are very low-cost products, recall cyberpunk and use technologies in an alternative way also as a stylistic choice.

A production based largely on the free contribution of participants is InvaXön – Alieni in Liguria (2004) by Massimo Morini and Enzo Pirrone, made for charity in favor of the prevention of fragile X syndrome; 250 non-professional actors, 41,000 extras and 23 personalities from the world of entertainment, sports and culture participated. The film was made with digital special effects, surround audio and THX certification, while the processing required seven years of planning, sixty days of shooting and 4,000 hours of work, also relying on the free contribution of participants and on a deliberately "homemade" approach, without the pretension of making a film on the model of Star Wars.

Other projects reached the public without going through theaters: AD Project by Eros Puglielli arrived on home video in May 2006, while Dark Resurrection – Volume 1 (2007) and the prequel Dark Resurrection – Volume 0 (2011) by Angelo Licata were made for the web and were part of the growth of independent and fan-made productions in the same years. The two amateur fan fictions inspired by the Star Wars universe involved a production effort comparable to or greater than that of independent films distributed in theaters, also including mass battle scenes made with the contribution of hundreds of volunteers in costume. In 2011 independent productions also included The Last Man on Earth (L'ultimo terrestre, 2011) and The Arrival of Wang (L'arrivo di Wang, 2011).

=== Comedy and political satire ===
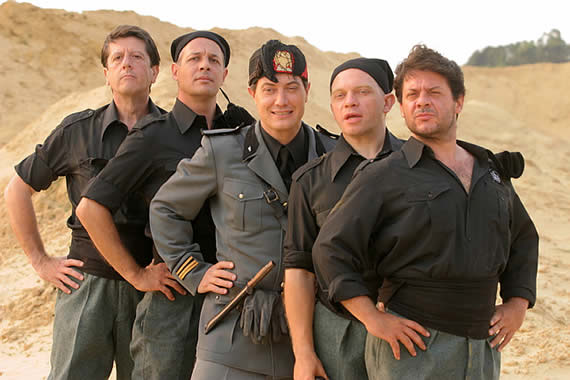
Fascisti su Marte (internationally released as Fascists on Mars, 2006)

Comedy and farce continued to be recurring forms of Italian science fiction aimed mainly at the domestic market; Fascisti su Marte (2006) relies on humor also to criticize Italian politics. The film, directed by Corrado Guzzanti and Igor Skofic, originates from the sketches made by Guzzanti for the satirical television program Il caso Scafroglia on Rai 3. It imagines an expedition of Black Shirts to the red planet and, parodying the style of the newsreels of the Istituto Luce of the fascist twenty years, proposes a fanta-historical revisionism that also concerns Italian politics during the Second Berlusconi government.

2061: An Exceptional Year (2061 – Un anno eccezionale, 2007) by Carlo Vanzina brings the satire of the present into a post-apocalyptic scenario and follows a ramshackle group of patriots who set off from Sicily in an attempt to reunify the peninsula. The film is among the few examples of Italian dystopian cinema in comic tones: the depletion of oil resources leads to the disintegration of Italy into several states and brings out separatisms and local rivalries, through which the film also represents the fragility of central institutions.

== From the 2010s ==
From the 2010s Italian science fiction developed in very different forms – dystopias, eco-dystopias, uchronias and post-catastrophic narratives – addressing the relationships between human beings, technology and the environment; in the same period the genre spread through different media and addressed an audience already accustomed to its mechanisms especially thanks to television series. In cinema, films rework superhero models, recount contemporary social tensions through the encounter with the alien, imagine eco-dystopias and address the way in which technology and control affect individual life.

=== Superheroes and comics ===
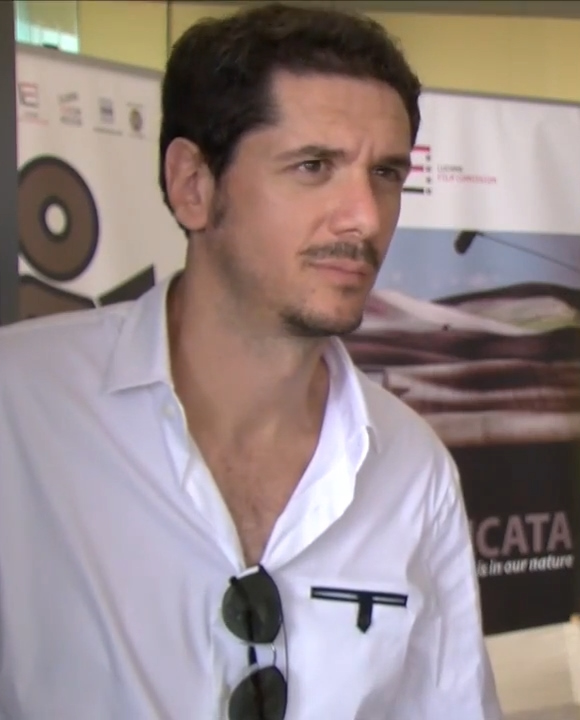
Gabriele Mainetti, director of Lo chiamavano Jeeg Robot (2016)

In Italian superhero films of the 2010s, American models are joined by international references and Italian settings; superpowers are also linked to fears and problems of contemporary Italy. Among these are The Invisible Boy (Il ragazzo invisibile, 2014) and its sequel, They Call Me Jeeg (Lo chiamavano Jeeg Robot, 2016) and Freaks Out (2021), which take up models and themes close to superhero cinema and comics. Seventeen years after Nirvana (1997), Gabriele Salvatores returned to science fiction with Il ragazzo invisibile (2014), addressing a teenage audience and choosing a superhero story; the film achieved a public success below expectations and four years later had a sequel, The Invisible Boy: Second Generation (Il ragazzo invisibile – Seconda generazione, 2018).

With Lo chiamavano Jeeg Robot (2016), the debut film of Gabriele Mainetti, the superhero model arrives in the Roman periphery: a small-time criminal comes into contact with a radioactive substance and acquires superhuman strength, while a girl believes he is the hero of a cartoon. Taking up themes and stereotypes of the American superhero, the film adapts them to contemporary Italy and combines entertainment with social criticism, setting the story from the outset in a recognizable Rome marked by references to mafia massacres and terrorist attacks, while the suburb and social condition accompany the protagonist's passage from marginality to responsibility towards others. Mixing Italian science fiction, Japanese anime and American superhero films, the film addresses different audiences by age and cultural interests and achieves notable public and critical success, with almost 5 million euros at the box office, seven David di Donatello and two Silver Ribbons.

With Freaks Out (2021) Mainetti returns to characters endowed with powers, this time setting them in occupied Rome of 1943; the setting, the characters and the language distinguish the film from American models and strengthen its Italian character.

=== The alien between crisis and peripheries ===
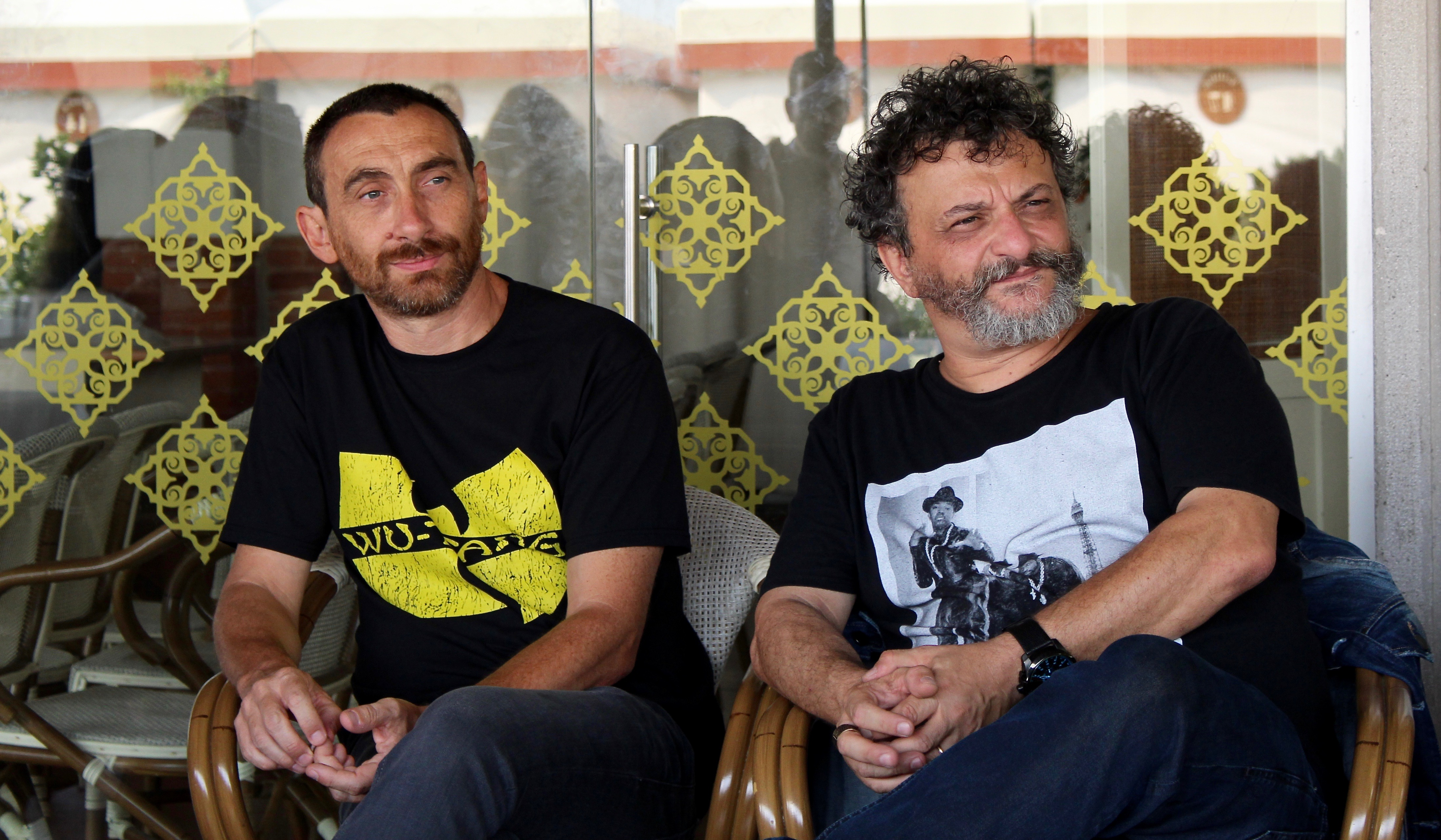
The Manetti Bros., directors of The Arrival of Wang (L'arrivo di Wang, 2011)

In some films of the 2010s the encounter with the alien takes place in contemporary Italy and is linked to the economic crisis, fears connected to immigration and the conditions of the peripheries. In The Last Man on Earth (L'ultimo terrestre, 2011) by Gipi the arrival of extraterrestrials takes place in a tired and disillusioned country, in the midst of a severe economic crisis, but the collective event remains in the background while the story focuses on the loneliness and relational difficulties of the protagonist. In the same year, in The Arrival of Wang (L'arrivo di Wang, 2011) by the Manetti Bros., a secret service agent interrogates with the help of an interpreter an alien who speaks Chinese; the film asks whether humanitarian principles can be applied to a non-human being and recalls fears linked to immigration. In 2023 La guerra del Tiburtino III (2023) by Luna Gualano instead brings the alien invasion to the extreme Roman periphery and makes it the means to recount in a paradoxical way inclusion, marginalization and isolation of the neighborhood.

=== Eco-dystopias and the crisis of the present ===
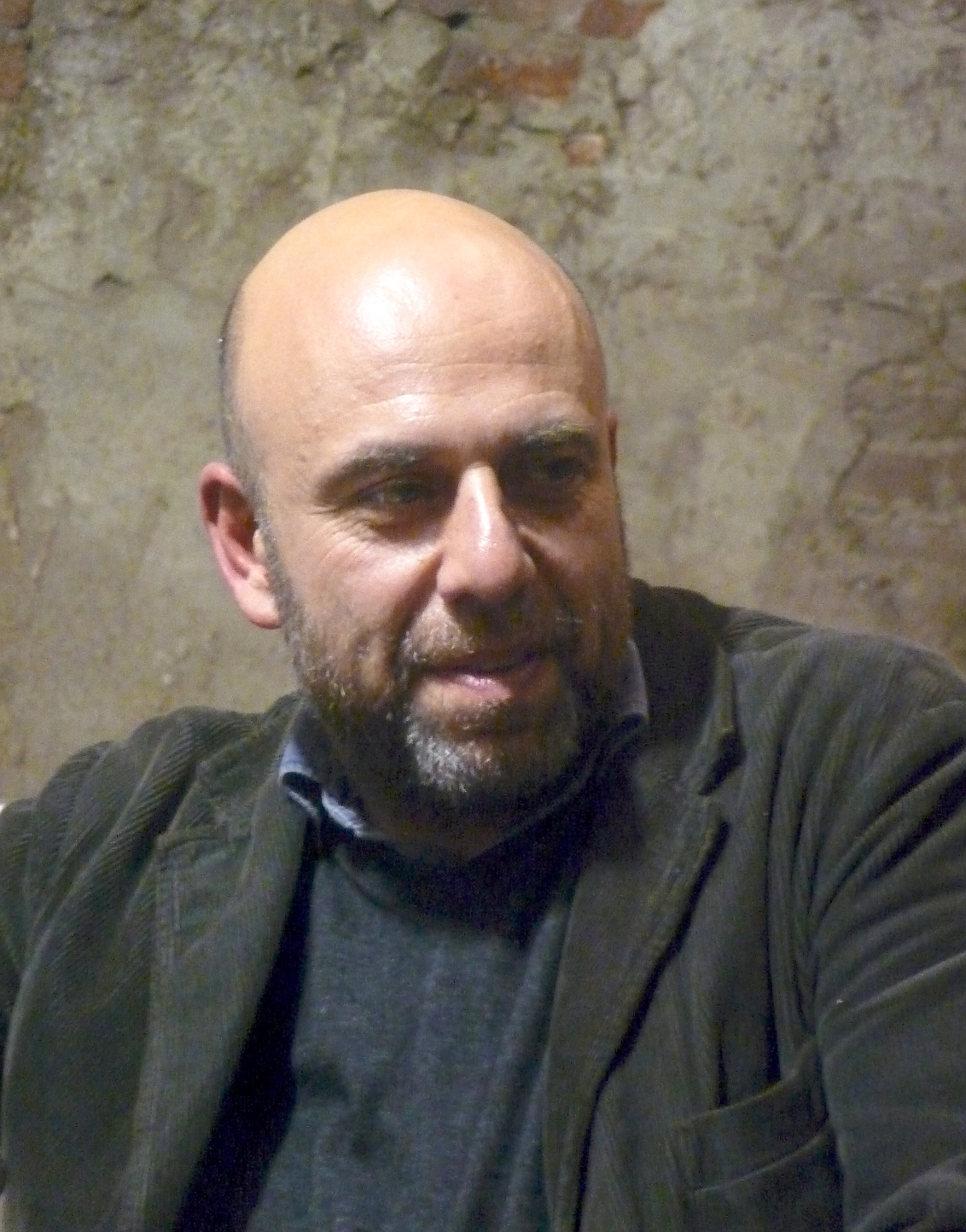
Paolo Virzì, director of Dry (Siccità, 2022)

Eco-dystopias combine post-apocalyptic and dystopian elements to imagine the consequences of the environmental crisis, starting from problems already present and taking them to the extreme until describing credibly worse living conditions. Mondocane (2021) by Alessandro Celli is set in a contaminated Taranto that recalls the situation of the former Ilva and recounts through science fiction the environmental and social degradation.

Dry (Siccità, 2022) by Paolo Virzì also brings the science fiction scenario close to the present: the Rome where it has not rained for years mixes post-apocalyptic elements and contemporary problems; presenting the climate emergency as a daily condition, the film highlights generational conflicts, political inadequacy and the need to rebuild a community.

=== Control, technology and identity ===
Other films of the period show technology as a tool of political or institutional control, as part of the digitalization of daily life and as a means to intervene on consciousness and memory.

In 2014 Alessandro Capone made 2047 - Sights of Death (2014), a homage to 1980s action cinema with an international cast including Danny Glover, Daryl Hannah, Michael Madsen, Stephen Baldwin and Rutger Hauer; written, produced and shot in Italy, it was presented in the original English version and also distributed abroad as a genre production aimed at the international market, openly modeled on American science fiction. The film is set in a dystopian future dominated by a repressive government, against which a rebel agent acts.

Hypersomnia (Ipersonnia, 2022) by Alberto Mascia imagines in a near future a penitentiary system that addresses overcrowding, worsening conditions of prisoners and difficulties of reintegration by keeping the convicted in deep sleep for the entire sentence. Il migliore dei mondi (2023) by Marcello Macchia, Danilo Carlani and Alessio Dogana instead recounts in the form of comedy the complete digitalization of daily life, making a technology-dependent man fall into an alternative 2023 that has remained stuck in the 1990s. Another End (2024) by Piero Messina, finally, speaks of identity and mourning through a technology capable of transferring for a short time the consciousness of a dead person into the body of another and thus offering the living a limited time to face separation.

== See also ==
- Cinema of Italy
- Eurospy film
- Fantafestival
- Film genre
- History of Italian science fiction
- Mockbuster
- Carlo Rambaldi
- Science-fiction film
- Spy-fi (subgenre)
- Trieste Science+Fiction Festival

== Bibliography ==
- Andersson, Johan (2017). "Landscape and Gentrification: The Picturesque and Pastoral in 1980s New York Cinema" (PDF). Antipode. 49 (3): 539–556. Bibcode:2017Antip..49..539A. doi:10.1111/anti.12310.
- Baschiera, Stefano (2016). Stefano Baschiera; Russ Hunter (eds.). The 1980s Italian Horror Cinema of Imitation: The Good, the Ugly and the Sequel. Edinburgh: Edinburgh University Press. pp. 45–61. doi:10.3366/edinburgh/9780748693528.003.0004. ISBN 9780748693528.
- Bazzichelli, Tatiana (2008). Networking. The Net as Artwork (PDF). Aarhus: Digital Aesthetics Research Center, Aarhus University. ISBN 9788791810084.
- Bertetti, Paolo (2014). "Uomini meccanici e matrimoni interplanetari. La straordinarissima avventura del cinema muto italiano di fantascienza". Anarres (2): 87–106.
- Bigliardi, Stefano (2021). "Mr. Superinvisible's Potion: Science, Scientists, and Technology in Antonio Margheriti's Films" (PDF). Simultanea. 2 (1).
- Bigliardi, Stefano (2022). "Macchine, marziani, monsignori: Technoscience and Religion in Italian Sociopolitical Science Fiction Films" (PDF). Simultanea. 3 (1).
- Borelli, Guido (2017). "Sociologia e letteratura: percorsi disciplinari e misletture" (PDF). Tracce Urbane (2): 82–115. doi:10.13133/2532-6562_1.2.7.
- Boschi, Alberto (2017). ""Let the Games Begin!" La figura del gioco distopico nel cinema e nella letteratura fantascientifica". Cinergie – Il Cinema e le Altre Arti. 6 (12): 269–280. doi:10.6092/issn.2280-9481/7389. ISSN 2280-9481.
- Brignoli, Francesca (2022). "Turbolenze all'orizzonte. Presenze queer nel cinema di fantascienza italiano degli anni Sessanta". Immagine. Note di Storia del Cinema. 22 (2): 129–144.
- Brioni, Simone; Comberiati, Daniele (2019). Italian Science Fiction: The Other in Literature and Film. Cham: Palgrave Macmillan. doi:10.1007/978-3-030-19326-3. ISBN 9783030193263.
- Brioni, Simone; Comberiati, Daniele (2020). Ideologia e rappresentazione. Percorsi attraverso la fantascienza italiana. Milan-Udine: Mimesis. ISBN 9788857560960.
- Busi Rizzi, Giorgio; Di Paola, Lorenzo; Dal Canto, Rodolfo (2024). "Mon Semblable, Mon Frère: Identity Needs, Imaginary, and Aesthetics in Marco and Antonio Manetti's Diabolik Trilogy". Cinergie – Il Cinema e le Altre Arti. 13 (25): 117–129. doi:10.6092/issn.2280-9481/18922. ISSN 2280-9481.
- Catricalà, Valentino (2014). "Io mi chiamo Avanguardia, e tu? L'effetto fantascientifico del cinema sperimentale italiano". Bianco e Nero. 75 (2): 62–71. doi:10.7371/78004. ISSN 0394-008X.
- Cesaro, Laura (2024). "Festival internazionale del film di fantascienza di Trieste: una traccia". Ultracorpi (2): 374–380. ISSN 2975-2604.
- Chiavini, Roberto; Pizzo, Gian Filippo; Tetro, Michele (2001). Il grande cinema di fantascienza da "2001" al 2001. Gli Album. Rome: Gremese. ISBN 88-8440-114-3.
- Chiavini, Roberto; Pizzo, Gian Filippo; Tetro, Michele (2003). Il grande cinema di fantascienza. Vol. 2: Aspettando il monolito nero (1902-1967). Gli album. Rome: Gremese. ISBN 88-8440-266-2.
- Chiti, Roberto; Poppi, Roberto (1991). Dizionario del cinema italiano. I film, vol. 2: Dal 1945 al 1959. Rome: Gremese. ISBN 88-7605-548-7.
- Comberiati, Daniele; Somigli, Luca (2021). "La fantascienza nelle narrazioni italiane ipercontemporanee". Narrativa. 43 (43): 7–17. doi:10.4000/narrativa.416.
- Curti, Roberto (2015). Italian Gothic Horror Films, 1957-1969. Jefferson: McFarland & Company. ISBN 9780786494378.
- Curti, Roberto (2019). Italian Gothic Horror Films, 1980-1989. Jefferson: McFarland & Company. ISBN 9781476672434.
- Cvijović, Momo; Đorgović, Marija (2014). Velika iluzija: Tito i 24 miliona metara filmske trake = The Grand Illusion: 24 million metres of celluloid (PDF). Belgrade: Muzej istorije Jugoslavije. ISBN 978-86-84811-25-9.
- De Masi, Vincenzo; Li, Siyi (2024). "The Japanese Film AI Amok (2020) and the Collapse of Realist AI Vision" (PDF). IAFOR Journal of Cultural Studies. 9 (Special Issue): 45–62. doi:10.22492/ijcs.9.si.03.
- Del Santo, Maurizio (5 May 2010). "Davanti agli occhi, dietro lo schermo: il cinema italiano di fantascienza". Delos Science Fiction (124).
- Della Rocca, Anna Maria (2020). Lo chiamavano Jeeg Robot. Un supereroe tra realtà e fantasia (PDF). Vienna: Universität Wien.
- Di Chiara, Francesco (2016). Stefano Baschiera; Russ Hunter (eds.). Domestic films made for export: modes of production of the 1960s Italian horror film. Edinburgh: Edinburgh University Press. pp. 30–44. ISBN 9781474419680.
- Dimasi, Nicolò (2024). "Inadequacy to Modernisation in 20th Century Italy: Salgari's Le meraviglie del Duemila and Antonioni's Deserto rosso" (PDF). Notes in Italian Studies (3): 39–47.
- Donda, Massimo (2009–2010). Il Cinema Italiano di Fantascienza: L'Opera Spaziale (Degree thesis). Udine: Università degli Studi di Udine.
- Fabbrica, Moreno, ed. (1998). Ritorno al futuro. La fantascienza in 201 film. Atlanti del cinema. Colognola ai Colli: Demetra. ISBN 88-440-0344-9.
- Faccioli, Alessandro (2019). "Muti mutanti. Frankenstein scopre il cinema". Cinergie - Il Cinema e le Altre Arti. 8 (15): 115–127. doi:10.6092/issn.2280-9481/9051. ISSN 2280-9481.
- Guaraldo, Emiliano (2023). "A Post-Apocalyptic Garden of Eden: Marco Ferreri's Il seme dell'uomo (1969)". Italian Science Fiction and the Environmental Humanities: 15–30. doi:10.2307/jj.30051419.6.
- Guarneri, Michael (2017). "The Gothic bet: Riccardo Freda's I vampiri (1957) and the birth of Italian horror cinema from an industrial perspective". Palgrave Communications. 3 29. doi:10.1057/s41599-017-0030-3.
- Guidi, Umberto (15 May 1998). "Sf made in Italy: Nirvana e gli altri". Delos Science Fiction (36).
- Hughes, Howard (2011). Cinema Italiano: The Complete Guide from Classics to Cult. I.B. Tauris. ISBN 978-1-84885-608-0.
- Hunter, Russ (2017). "'I have a picture of the Monster!': Il mostro di Frankenstein and the search for Italian horror cinema". Journal of Italian Cinema & Media Studies. 5 (2): 159–172. doi:10.1386/jicms.5.2.159_1.
- Jurišić, Srećko (2011). "Il turismo bellico. Sulle categorie del riso nell'immaginario postcoloniale italiano". Zbornik radova Filozofskog fakulteta u Splitu (4): 123–141.
- Kinnard, Roy; Crnkovich, Tony (2017). Italian Sword and Sandal Films, 1908–1990. Jefferson: McFarland & Company. ISBN 9781476662916.
- Koven, Mikel J. (2014). "The Giallo and the Spaghetti Nightmare Film". The Italian Cinema Book: 203–210. doi:10.1007/978-1-349-92642-8_25. ISBN 978-1-83871-170-2.
- Landron, Fabien (2025). "Distopie all'italiana: Dystopian Depiction of the Souths of Italy through the Screens (Anna by N. Ammaniti and Mondocane by A. Celli, 2021)". Reframing Souths: Ecocritical Perspectives on South in Literature, Film, and New Media: 247–260. doi:10.54103/milanoup.213.c418. ISBN 979-12-5510-266-3.
- Malvestio, Marco (2021). "Sognando la catastrofe. L'eco-distopia italiana del ventunesimo secolo". Narrativa. 43 (43): 31–44. doi:10.4000/narrativa.421.
- Malvestio, Marco (2025). The Ecology of Italian Science Fiction. Toronto: University of Toronto Press. doi:10.3138/9781487554705 (inactive 31 October 2026). ISBN 9781487554712.
- Martinelli, Vittorio (1996). Il cinema muto italiano 1921. I film degli anni venti. Rome: Nuova ERI; Edizioni RAI; Centro Sperimentale di Cinematografia. ISBN 88-397-0921-5.
- Marzaduri, Francesco Saverio (2020). "Adrian: il tempo (non) se ne va..." Carte di Cinema (23).
- Mastroddi, Enrico Maria (2008). "Il cinema digitale in Europa. Analisi delle potenzialità del digitale nel settore cinematografico" (PDF). Osservatorio Dello Spettacolo.
- Menarini, Roy (2002). La parodia nel cinema italiano. Intertestualità, parodia e comico nel cinema italiano. Bologna: Hybris. ISBN 88-8372-137-3.
- Mereghetti, Paolo, ed. (1994). Dizionario dei film italiani. Vol. 1: A-L. s.l.: Video Club Luce - VideoRai.
- Micalizzi, Paolo (2018). "Compilation Cineteca FEDIC" (PDF). Fedic Notizie (49): 10–17.
- Missero, Dalila (2018). La scalata al sesso. L'erotismo nel cinema italiano degli anni Sessanta (Thesis). Bologna: Alma Mater Studiorum – Università di Bologna. doi:10.6092/unibo/amsdottorato/8507.
- Muggeo, Giulia (2025). "Diabolik e i suoi cugini. Emuli e parodie del ladro mascherato nel sistema dei media degli anni Sessanta". Ultracorpi. Il Fantastico Nelle Arti Dello Spettacolo. 3: 105–126. hdl:2318/2092136. ISSN 2975-2604.
- O'Leary, Alan (2011). "The Phenomenology of the cinepanettone". Italian Studies. 66 (3): 431–443. doi:10.1179/007516311X13134938380526. ISSN 0075-1634.
- Oppedisano, Federico O.; Rossi, Daniele (2018). "Modelli virtuali immersivi dalle visioni della fantascienza sociologica del cinema europeo". Diségno. 1 (2): 95–104. doi:10.26375/disegno.2.2018.12.
- Orsitto, Fulvio (2007–2008). "Nirvana di Gabriele Salvatores: tra Spaghetti-Sci-Fi e cinema d'autore" (PDF). NeMLA Italian Studies. 31: 65–84. ISSN 1087-6715.
- Palladino, Anna Chiara (2021). "Lo chiamavano Jeeg Robot: un supereroe italiano tra eroismo e decadenza". Narrativa. 43 (43): 259–269. doi:10.4000/narrativa.453.
- Pergolari, Andrea (2025). "La stirpe di Diabolik. Come le K invasero il cinema italiano degli anni Sessanta". Ultracorpi. Il Fantastico Nelle Arti Dello Spettacolo (3): 127–149. ISSN 2975-2604.
- Pezzotta, Alberto (2025). "Diabolik di Mario Bava. Un eroe del neocapitalismo". Ultracorpi. Il Fantastico Nelle Arti Dello Spettacolo. 3: 63–85. hdl:10808/66987. ISSN 2975-2604.
- Pollard, Damien (2024). "To the Cinema, and Beyond! Luigi Cozzi, Sci-Fi Exhibition and Starcrash". Film Exhibition: The Italian Context: 289–306. doi:10.2307/jj.22212190.17.
- Rushing, Robert (2015). "The Weight of History: Immunity and the Nation in Italian Science-Fiction Cinema". Science Fiction Studies. 42 (2): 339–352. doi:10.5621/sciefictstud.42.2.0339.
- Spagnoletti, Giovanni (2021). "La fantascienza italiana tra impegno e distopia nel cinema del '68 e dintorni" (PDF). Archivio Audiovisivo del Movimento Operaio e Democratico. Annali (21): 79–86.
- Sponzilli, Giada (2017). Il mito del supereroe. Dal fumetto al cinema italiano contemporaneo. Rome: Edizioni Mediterranee. ISBN 978-88-272-2779-4.
- Sublimi anatomie. Public program. Palazzo delle Esposizioni. 2019.
- Tabanelli, Roberta (2015). "Blue-Haired-Girl Mnemonic: Italian Sci-Fi Nirvana". Gender/Sexuality/Italy (2). doi:10.15781/4rnb-kq59.
- Vella, Daniel (2025). "The Greatest Extravaganza of Mortal Combat Ever Staged: I guerrieri dell'anno 2072, Classicism, Fascism, and Media Consolidation in 1980s Italy". Eludamos: Journal for Computer Game Culture. 16 (1): 131–148. doi:10.7557/23.7928.
- Venturelli, Renato (March 2015). "Il ragazzo invisibile e i supereroi educational" (PDF). LG Argomenti. 51 (1): 33–35. ISSN 1974-6652.
- Verona, Francesco (2016). Forme della citazione del melodramma operistico nel cinema italiano: 1960-2015. Padua: Università degli Studi di Padova. hdl:11577/3425255.
- Yar, Majid (2015). Crime and the Imaginary of Disaster: Post-Apocalyptic Fictions and the Crisis of Social Order. London: Palgrave Macmillan. doi:10.1057/9781137509079. ISBN 978-1-137-50906-2.
- Young, Damon R. (2018). Making Sex Public and Other Cinematic Fantasies. Durham: Duke University Press. doi:10.1215/9781478002765. ISBN 978-1-4780-0167-6.
- Zorzoli, Barbara (January–February 2006). "Invaxön. Buio Pesto, musica e immagini fantascientifiche" (PDF). Colonne Sonore (16): 24–26.
