= History of Italian science fiction =

History of science fiction in Italy

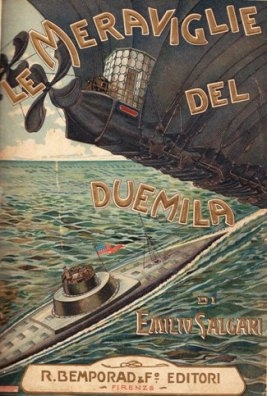
Cover of Le meraviglie del duemila (1907) by Emilio Salgari, often cited as an early example of Italian proto-science fiction; illustration by Carlo Chiostri.

The history of Italian science fiction concerns the development of speculative narrative in Italy from early proto-science-fictional works to the emergence of science fiction as a recognizable publishing category in the mid-20th century. Although Italian literature had long included imaginary voyages, utopian writing, and scientifically inflected fantasy, science fiction became established in Italy primarily after the Second World War, under strong Anglo-American influence, before developing a more distinct local tradition.

== Early antecedents ==
Long before science fiction was formalized as a modern genre, Italian literature produced works that have often been discussed as proto-science fiction, including visionary journeys, utopian narratives, and speculative texts. In surveys of the Italian tradition, critics have pointed to authors such as Dante Alighieri, Ludovico Ariosto, Tommaso Campanella and later writers of fantastic and scientific romance as important antecedents.

In modern literary history, the development of Italian science fiction has often been traced from the late 19th century and especially from the period after Italian unification, when rapid social change, industrial modernity, and new scientific imaginaries began to affect literary production more directly.

== Emergence as a publishing genre ==
Science fiction became recognizable in Italy as a distinct commercial and editorial category only after the Second World War. Its early consolidation depended heavily on the importation and translation of Anglo-American works, which introduced not only stories and authors but also genre conventions, editorial formats, and marketing strategies.

A major turning point came with the launch of Mondadori's I romanzi di Urania in 1952. Mondadori describes it as a twice-monthly publication of novel-length stories, first issued on 10 October 1952. It soon became the most influential Italian science-fiction series and played a central role in shaping the genre's readership in Italy.

Italian science fiction of the 1950s remained deeply dependent on translation. The decade was marked by the assimilation of Anglo-American models and by a gradual movement from imitation toward more local re-use of the genre's themes and forms.

== Authors, magazines, and debates ==
From the 1960s into the 1970s, Italian science fiction became increasingly articulated through magazines, specialist series, critical debate, and the work of Italian authors writing within or alongside imported genre models. Studies of the period commonly emphasize the importance of periodicals such as Urania, Oltre il Cielo, Galassia, Futuro, and later Robot in creating a national science-fiction field.

Writers associated with the development of Italian science fiction in these decades included Lino Aldani and Vittorio Curtoni. Aldani was also important as a critic and editor; he wrote one of the first monographic studies of science fiction in Italian and co-founded the magazine Futuro in 1963.

Rather than developing in isolation, Italian science fiction in these decades emerged through a continuing interaction between translation, editorial framing, reader formation, and literary debate.

== Later developments ==
Later studies of Italian science fiction have treated the genre as extending beyond pulp or magazine culture into broader literary and cultural debates, including questions of alterity, colonialism, and identity in both literature and film.

Recent scholarship has also emphasized the breadth of the Italian science-fiction tradition across the 19th, 20th and 21st centuries, treating it as a long-standing but historically under-recognized component of Italian literary and media culture.

== See also ==
- Science fiction
- Italian literature
- Italian science fiction cinema
- Urania (magazine)
