= Michele Sambin =

Italian theatre director and artist

Michele Sambin (born 1951 in Padua) is an Italian theatre director and artist.

In 1967 he moved to Venice and attended the Artistic High School of the lagoon city. In 1968 he made his first experimental film called Anamnesis. He began attending the newly founded International University of Art (UIA) in 1969, founded by Giuseppe Mazzariol to create a link between artistic experiences and problems affecting the Venetian territory. Sambin then reflects on the city of Venice making the films Laguna (1971) and later Blud'acqua (1972). In 1972, on the occasion of his first solo show, held in Abano at Galleria Image, he met Teresa Rampazzi, one of the first women in Italy to produce and experiment with electronic and avant-garde music. Sambin began to participate in his research and in 1975 he graduated in the course of Electronic Music at the Benedetto Marcello Conservatory in Venice with Alvise Vidolin.

From 1974 to the experience with cinema Sambin joins the experimentation with the video and realizes the first works of video art with the Galleria del Cavallino in Venice, directed by Paolo Cardazzo. Sambin will be the first artist to experiment since 1976, later declining the operation in many variations, the videoloop, the open reel video: technique for which through the creation of a magnetic tape ring is enclosed, in a single device, the shooting of an event and its reproduction while achieving a temporal decay of the image and sound. In Sax soprano due (1980) the author plays using multiple tracks pre-recorded by him.

His research on the technological and poetic specificities of the video is presented in several events including: International Performance Week (Settimana Internazionale della performance), curated by Renato Barilli at the Galleria d'arte moderna in Bologna in 1977 where he presents Autoritratto per quattro camere e quattro voci; Le camere incantate curated by Vittorio Fagone and held in Milan, Palazzo Reale in 1980, where he presents il tempo consuma; Forme scenografiche della televisione (Scenographic forms of television) at the Triennale di Milano in 1981 where he exhibited his video installation From left to right a work produced with the Video Art Center of Palazzo dei Diamanti, Ferrara.

In 1980, with the foundation of the TAM Teatromusica, he devoted himself to directing plays. In this way he has created more than 80 operas for the stage that are presented in various national and international festivals including: the Wiener Festwochen (1989), the Third Jerusalem International Festival (1985), the Granada International Theatre Festival (1987), the Festival Santarcangelo dei Teatri (1989,1990,1991) and the Festival d'Automne à Paris (1991). Some of the works are created on commission and have a strong musical component such as: Ages on music by Bruno Maderna, Milan RAI commission; Children's Corner to music by Claude Debussy, commissioned by Teatro alla Scala in Milano and ...1995...2995...3695...on music by Marco Stroppa, commission of the Biennale Musica of Venezia. In all the theatrical works it is evident how the musical process is the engine of creation for the drafting of the scenic score. «Il Tam darà vita a un ostinato lavoro di rifondazione del linguaggio scenico: musiche e video con tracce grafiche realizzate in tempo reale produrranno sul palco un ricercato effetto pittorico, ottenuto con la manipolazione di forme tramite una tavoletta digitale» («The Tam will give life to an obstinate work of refoundation of the scenic language: music and video with graphic tracks made in real time will produce on stage a refined pictorial effect, obtained with the manipulation of forms through a digital tablet»). Sambin's theatrical work was recognized and awarded in 2014 with the Ubu.

== Awards ==
In season 1984/1985, he won the prize of the Italian Theatre Authority (ETI) with Era nell'aria, a show that contains a strong reference to the instrumental theater of Mauricio Kagel.

In 2000 he received the E. M. Salerno Prize for the theatrical show Fratellini di legno made with the company of prisoners of the prison of Padua with which he makes videos and shows.

For the show Anima blu he received the award for best scenography at the Feten Gijon Festival (2009) and the prize for music at the XIX International Puppet Theatres Festival Meetings Torun (2012).

Michele Sambin, together with the Tam Teatromusica won the Ubu Theatre Prize in 2014 «per l'incessante attività di ricerca tesa a coniugare impegno di interazione sociale e intreccio delle arti in un reciproco scambio di valori ed esperienze» («for the incessant research aimed at combining commitment to social interaction and interweaving of the arts in a mutual exchange of values and experiences»).

== Tribute ==
Michele Sambin, together with Pierangela Allegro is the protagonist of the docufilm entitled "Più de la vita" made by Raffaella Rivi and produced by Kublai Film in 2019.

== Selected exhibitions ==
- 1977 - La Settimana Internazionale della Performance, Bologna
- 1978 - 38. Esposizione Internazionale d'Arte: dalla natura all'arte dall'arte alla natura, Venice
- 1980 - Camere Incantate, Royal Palace, Milan
- 1981 - Lo spazio scenografico della televisione italiana - XVI Triennale, Milan
- 2001 - elettroshock, 30 anni di video in Italia 1971-2001; Rome, 21-27 may
- 2003 - INVIDEO Istantanee – Instant Images XIII edizione Mostra Internazionale di video d'arte e cinema oltre; Paris, Centre Wallonie Bruxelles, 4 november 2003; Milano, Spazio Oberdan, 5 – 9 november 2003
- 2015 - Looking for listening; De' Foscherari Gallery, Bologna, 02 october 2015 - 02 november
- 2015 - Michele Sambin "Solo" XIII Mostra internazionale del Video e Cinema d'Autore; Tupputi Palace, Bisceglie, October 2019 – June 2020
- 2015 - 2016 - Luce. Scienza Cinema Arte; Governor's Palace, Parma, 14 november 2015 – 17 anjuary 2016
- 2021 - Michele Sambin, La sonorità dell'immagine; Monumental atrium Asp-Itis, Trieste, 25 june – 19 september

== Significant works ==
- 1972: Blud'acqua, 16 mm, color, magnetic sound, 25'
- 1976: Film a strisce (La petite mort), 16 mm, color, mute, 3'
- 1976: Oihcceps, european standard, open reel 1/2", b/w, 1' 17"
- 1977: Playing 4, 8, 12..., european standard, open reel 1/2", b/w, 18' 34"
- 1977/2013: Looking for listening, european standard, 3 open reel tapes 1/2", b/w, 28' ogni nastro; video-performance; ASAC Venice commission
- 1977/2016: Diogene, 16 mm, color, magnetic sound, 2' 26"
- 1978: Dodici animali, U-Matic 3/4", color, 17' 28", music performance
- 1980: Sax soprano due, Loop 1/2", U-Matic 3/4", b/w, 4' 21"
- 1980: Armoniche, sound movements in space
- 1981: From left to right, music video-installation
- 1984: Se San Sebastiano sapesse, performance, 25', solo for cello
- 1987: Macchine sensibili
- 1988: Lupus et agnus
- 1991: Fuore de mi medesimo, dalla Lettera di Ruzante a Messer Marco Alvarotto of Angelo Beolco
- 1994: Medit'Azioni, Hi8, colore, 57' 39", video opera
- 1999: Sogno di Andrej
- 2000: Barbablù, in principio, sound theatre little opera in seven movements
- 2003: Più de la vita, solo for voice body and instruments
- 2004: Stupor Mundi
- 2007: Anima blu, tribute to Marc Chagall
- 2006/2008: Tutto è vivo
- 2007/08/09: deForma
- 2009: Solo, video installation

== See also ==
- Videoart
- Galleria del Cavallino
- Angelica Novak
- Sirio Luginbühl
- Premio Ubu
- Teatro Maddalene

== Bibliography ==
- S. Lischi (2003). S. Cargioli (ed.). INVIDEO 2003, Istantanee -Instant Images, XIII edizione, Mostra Internazionale di video d'arte e cinema oltre (A+G edizioni ed.). Milano: S. Cargioli. ISBN 88-88272-03-8.
- Luginbühl, S. (1974). Cinema Underground oggi. Padova: Mastrogiacomo Editore.
- Lischi, S.; Parolo, L. (2014). Michele Sambin. Performance tra musica, pittura e video. Padova: Cleup. ISBN 978-88-6787-239-8.
- Lischi, S. (2001). Visioni elettroniche, l'oltre del cinema e l'arte del video. Rome: Fondazione Scuola nazionale di cinema. ISBN 88-317-7808-0. IT\ICCU\PUV\0793999.
- Marangon, D. Videotapes del Cavallino (Edizioni del Cavallino ed.). Venezia.
- Marchiori, F., ed. (2010). Megaloop. L'arte scenica di Tam Teatromusica. Corazzano (PI): Titivillus. ISBN 978-88-7218-291-8.
- Monteverdi, A.M. (2020). Leggere uno spettacolo multimediale. La nuova scena tra video mapping, interaction design e Intelligenza Artificiale (in Italian). Roma: Dino Audino. ISBN 978-88-7527-446-7. {{SAFESUBST:}} IT\ICCU\VEAV\045592.
- Luginbuhl, S.; Cardazzo, P. Videotapes. Arte, tecnica e storia. Padova: Mastrogiacomo Editore.
- "La Biennale di Venezia 1978: Dalla natura all'arte. Dall'arte alla natura: catalogo". Venezia.
