= The Arrival of Wang =

2011 film

- Film poster
- Italian: L'arrivo di Wang
- Directed by: Manetti Bros.
- Written by: Manetti Bros.
- Starring: Ennio Fantastichini; Francesca Cuttica
- Cinematography: Alessandro Chiodo
- Edited by: Federico Maria Maneschi
- Music by: Pivio and Aldo De Scalzi
- Release date: 4 September 2011 (Venice)
- Running time: 80 minutes
- Country: Italy
- Language: Italian

The Arrival of Wang (Italian: L'arrivo di Wang) is a 2011 Italian science fiction drama film directed by the Manetti Bros.

The film premiered at the 68th Venice International Film Festival on 4 September 2011.

== Cast ==
- Ennio Fantastichini as Curti
- Francesca Cuttica as Gaia Aloisi
- Juliet Esey Joseph as Cynthia Amounike
- Li Yong as Wang (voice)
- Antonello Morroni as Max
- Jader Giraldi as Falco
- Carmen Giardina as the Doctor
- Rodolfo Baldini as De Renzi
- Angelo Nicotra as the General
- Massimo Triggiani as Riboldi
- Furio Ferrari Pocoleri as Torricelli
