= A Marriage in the Moon =

- E. Novelli in A Marriage in the Moon
- Directed by: Enrico Novelli
- Written by: Enrico Novelli (it)
- Produced by: Latium Films
- Starring: Enrico Novelli
- Release date: 1910
- Running time: 15 minutes
- Country: Italy
- Languages: Silent film Italian intertitles

Un Matrimonio Interplanetario (English: A Marriage on the Moon) is an Italian silent cortometraggio (short film), written and directed by Enrico de’ Conti Novelli da Bertinoro in 1910. The film's story is based on Novelli's novel La Colonia Lunare English: The Moon Colony (1908), published under Novelli's frequently-used pseudonym, Yambo in 1908. Un Matrimonio Interplanetario (1910) is the oldest surviving Italian science-fiction film.

In the film, an astronomer from Earth proposes marriage to a young Martian woman. They both use spacecraft to travel to the Moon for their wedding, but they are attacked there by humanoid aliens.

== Plot ==
Aldovino the Astronomer gazes at the stars through his telescope, when he discovers the rocky and mountainous planet Mars, sparsely covered with various foliage and mushrooms. The planet is inhabited by a civilization unlike Aldovino's on Earth.

As Aldovino inspects the planet, he sees a beautiful young woman with a man in their observatory. The woman and Aldovino see each other from their home planets through their telescopes at the same time. Aldovino is struck by her beauty, and she waves invitingly to him. This sends Aldovino into a love frenzy to do whatever it takes to travel to the alien woman's planet and marry her.

Aldovino goes to the Telegraph and sends a radiotelegraph into space professing his love for the woman and asking for her hand in marriage. The letters of the radiotelegraph spiral through space, depicted as a swirling snake of letters. The letters arrive in the woman's observatory and are printed into a slip of paper by a machine. The radiotelegraph reads,

“Mars Daughter [sic], You are fine. I am loving you and I should like very much to marry you. Aldovin, [Terrestrial] Astronomer.”

The man in the observatory with the woman responds with his own radiotelegraph to Aldovino stating,

“If you want to marry my daughter come in a year [on] the Moon. Fur, Astronomer of Mars.”

The inhabitants of Fur's and his daughter's planet prepare for the wedding, while Aldovino begins constructing his spaceship. He successfully launches himself and his assistant to the Moon in a cannon-ball-like spacecraft. Fur and his daughter use their own spacecraft which propels them to the Moon.

Aldovino and the daughter of Mars finally meet, and a marriage ceremony takes place. Not long after, the couple are attacked by a group of humanoid aliens. Aldovino frightens the aliens away, and him and his new wife embrace. A group of dancing Moon-maids arrive to celebrate their union, concluding the film.

== Cast ==
Enrico Novelli (it) as Adolvin

== Production and analysis ==

In 1908, Novelli wrote La Colonia Lunare (English: The Moon Colony). Two years later, he directed Un Matrimonio Interplanetario under the Production Company Latium Films.

Novelli designed the film's sets based on his illustrations for La Colonia Lunare. Mars is portrayed as a hyper-technological planet, parallel to the Earth, but more advanced than terrestrial society.

Though none of the characters are named in the film, Caneppele et al. have deciphered both Aldovino's and Fur's radiotelegraphs, revealing plot information not overtly stated in the film.

The message in Aldovino's radiotelegraph states,

“Mars Daughter [sic], You are fine. I am loving you and I should like very much to marry you. Aldovin, [Terrestrial] Astronomer."

The message reveals that the woman Aldovino desires is from Mars, and the main character's name is Aldovin.

The young woman's father's response reveals even more plot information.

The message in Fur's radiotelegraph states,

“If you want to marry my daughter come in a year [on] the Moon. Fur, Astronomer of Mars.”

The message reveals that the man in the observatory with the young woman is her father, named Fur. It also reveals that both are from Mars, and that the marriage will take place on the Moon.

== See also ==
- List of films set on Mars
