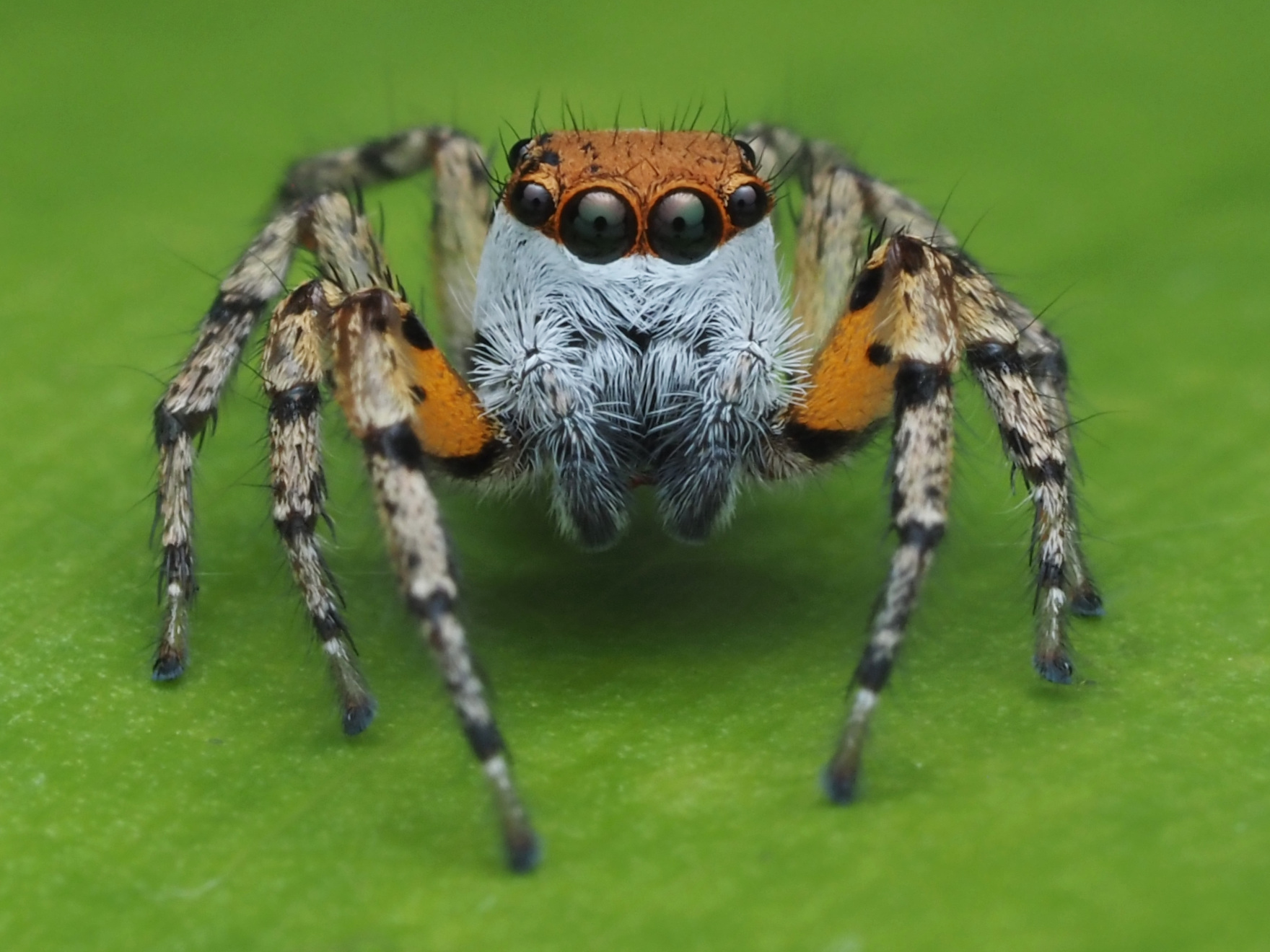
- male Tarkas maculatipes

Scientific classification
- Kingdom: Animalia
- Phylum: Arthropoda
- Subphylum: Chelicerata
- Class: Arachnida
- Order: Araneae
- Infraorder: Araneomorphae
- Family: Salticidae
- Subfamily: Salticinae
- Genus: Tarkas; Edwards, 2015
- Species: T. maculatipes

Binomial name
- Tarkas maculatipes (F. O. Pickard-Cambridge, 1901)

= Tarkas =

Genus of spiders

Tarkas is a genus of the jumping spider family, Salticidae. The single described species, Tarkas maculatipes, is found in Mexico and Guatemala.

The genus is named after the character Tars Tarkas from the Edgar Rice Burroughs novel A Princess of Mars.
