= Princess of Mars =

- Directed by: Mark Atkins
- Written by: Mark Atkins
- Based on: A Princess of Mars by Edgar Rice Burroughs (uncredited)
- Produced by: David Michael Latt; David Rimawi; Paul Bales
- Starring: Antonio Sabato, Jr. Traci Lords
- Distributed by: The Asylum
- Release date: December 29, 2009
- Running time: 90 minutes
- Country: United States
- Language: English

Princess of Mars (also released on DVD as John Carter of Mars) is a 2009 direct-to-DVD science fiction film made by American independent studio The Asylum, loosely based on the Edgar Rice Burroughs novel A Princess of Mars (1917). The film's promotional art mentions how the original story inspired some elements of the James Cameron film Avatar (2009), but neither the credits nor promotional material mention Edgar Rice Burroughs. It is not to be confused with the higher-budget science fantasy film John Carter (2012), which is a direct adaptation of the novel. In the UK, the film was released with the title The Martian Colony Wars, and in other international markets (such as Japan) with the title Avatar of Mars.

== Plot ==
John Carter is a modern-day U.S. Army sniper serving in Afghanistan, wounded in the line of duty and used in a teleportation experiment wherein he is transferred to Barsoom, a planet in the Alpha Centauri stellar system, far from the Sun-based Solar System of Earth, where he exhibits the ability to leap amazing distances. Initially enslaved by the Tharks, he earns a rank among them and later saves a rival group's princess, the human-looking Dejah Thoris, from death.

The group of Tharks, led by Tars Tarkas, takes Carter to their leader Tal Hajus, guarded by Tars Tarkas' daughter Sola. Learning that Tarkas gave Carter a military rank only Hajus can give, Tarkas and Carter are forced to duel. Upon winning, Carter faces Sarka, an Afghan mercenary who had betrayed him. When Sarka escapes, Carter helps Tarkas kill Hajus and become the new leader of the Tharks.

Captain Carter then learns that Dejah Thoris has fled to the planetary air-cleaning station that keeps Barsoom habitable, which Sarka damages, causing the atmosphere to deteriorate. John Carter and Sarka face each other in a duel, but Sarka is killed by an insect during the fight. After Carter and Dejah Thoris reactivate the station, Carter is returned to Earth, where he declines to tell his superiors about his adventures for fear they will colonize Barsoom, and returns to military duties while hoping one day to return to the planet.

== Cast ==
- Antonio Sabàto Jr. as John Carter
- Traci Lords as Dejah Thoris
- Matt Lasky as Tars Tarkas
- Chacko Vadaketh as Sarka / Sab Than
- Mitchell Gordon as Tal Hajus
- Noelle Perris as Sola

== Production ==
This film makes extensive use of the Vasquez Rocks for its alien landscape, appearing throughout the film as different locations.

It was the first attempt to adapt Burroughs's novel on screen.

== Reception ==
Although the film's cast was considered a step-up for the Asylum, reception was generally negative and the film was called "terrible".

Cinema.de found the film was a "C-movie without ideas" while Filmdienst indicated it seemed to be vaguely inspired by Avatar.

== See also ==
- List of films set on Mars
