= Thark =

Thark may refer to:

- Tharks, a tribe of creatures on the fictional planet of Barsoom, created by Edgar Rice Burroughs for the 1917 novel A Princess of Mars
- Thark (play) a 1927 play by Ben Travers, one of his Aldwych farces
- Thark (film), a 1932 film based on the play, also known as Thark the Haunted House
