= List of films set on Mars =

There is a body of films that are set on the planet Mars. In the late 19th century, people erroneously believed that there were canals on Mars. Into the early 20th century, additional observations of Mars fed people's interest in what was called "Mars fever". One of the earliest films to be set on Mars was the short film A Trip to Mars (1910), which was produced by one of Thomas Edison's film companies. In the 1920s through the 1960s, more films featured Mars or extraterrestrial Martians. In the 1960s and 1970s, the Mariner program and the Viking program revealed new scientific details about Mars that showed little prospect for life. The Guardian said, "These disappointing discoveries changed the place of Mars on humanity's mental map. Films began to reflect this." Films such as Total Recall (1990) and Red Planet (2000) focused more on the colonization of Mars by humans.

The Guardian, reporting on the release of John Carter (2012), said, since 1995, six films featuring Mars performed poorly at the box office. Wired, reporting on the release of The Martian (2015), said prior films set on Mars—Red Planet, Mission to Mars (2000), and The Last Days on Mars (2013)—were "notable flops" that were the most recent in a "dismal track record of Mars movies".

The Atlantic called The Martian "the subgenre's newest and best entry", citing the positive reviews and strong box office returns on opening weekend. It said, "Many films seek to dramatize the Red Planet’s harsh landscape as a romantic frontier, but The Martian is one that actually succeeds."

== List of films ==
The following films are listed alphabetically. The list can be sorted chronologically by clicking the diamond shape which follows the word "Year":

| Film | Year | Description |
|---|---|---|
| 2036 Origin Unknown | 2018 | After a mission to Mars results in a mysterious shuttle disappearance, mission controller Mackenzie “Mack” Wilson and an AI named ARTI discover a potentially alien cube on Mars that teleports to Earth, leading to revelations about the shuttle disaster, humanity's fate, and Mack's own identity within a cosmic intrigue. |
| A Marriage in the Moon | 1910 | ? |
| Ad Astra | 2019 | An astronaut ventures into space, stopping off at Mars, in search of his lost father, who is on an obsessive quest that could destroy Earth. |
| Aelita | 1924 | In this silent film, a man travels to Mars and leads a popular uprising against the authorities and attracts the love of Queen Aelita. |
| The Angry Red Planet | 1959 | Astronauts who return to Earth after a human flight to Mars recount encountering hostile creatures, with only two surviving the encounter. |
| Approaching the Unknown | 2016 | ? |
| Astronomeous | 1928 | ? |
| The Brave Little Toaster Goes to Mars | 1998 | ? |
| Christmas on Mars | 2008 | The film tells the story of experiences during the first Christmas on a newly colonized Mars. |
| Conquest of Space | 1955 | A team of astronauts on a space station leave on the first mission to Mars. The commanding officer gradually suffers a mental breakdown as the mission proceeds, prompting divided loyalties within the crew. |
| Cowboy Bebop: The Movie | 2001 | The feature film spin-off of the Japanese anime series is set on Mars. |
| Doom | 2005 | Based on the video game series Doom, a group of Marines embark on a search-and-rescue mission after a research facility on Mars is attacked. |
| Escape from Mars | 1999 | Five astronauts make the first human trip to Mars. |
| Felix the Cat Flirts With Fate | 1926 | ? |
| Flight to Mars | 1951 | A human expedition team lands on Mars and discovers an underground civilization that is dying out. |
| Forsaken | 2018 | ? |
| Ghosts of Mars | 2001 | On a mostly terraformed Mars, a team of police officers search for missing miners and discover that they have been possessed by spirits from an ancient Martian civilization. |
| It! The Terror from Beyond Space | 1958 | At the beginning of the film, the sole survivor of a human mission to Mars is recovered by a second rocket ship, but a monster stows away on board for the trip back to Earth. |
| John Carter | 2012 | Based on the 1912 novel A Princess of Mars by Edgar Rice Burroughs, former American Civil War Confederate Army captain John Carter is transported to Mars and becomes involved in a conflict among its inhabitants. |
| Just Imagine | 1930 | A young man is in love with a woman and must impress government officials to marry her. To do this, he travels to Mars with this best friend, and they are accompanied by a stowaway. |
| The Last Days on Mars | 2013 | On the first human mission to Mars, a crew member discovers fossil evidence of bacterial life. When contact is lost with him, the rest of the crew investigates and learns that there is still life on the planet. |
| The Man from M.A.R.S. | 1922 | ? |
| Mars | 1930 | ? |
| Mars | 1997 | Virtually a low-budget remake of Total Recall (1990), with martial arts star Olivier Gruner at the center of the action. |
| Mars | 2024 | ? |
| Mars Attacks! | 1996 | ? |
| Mars and Beyond | 1957 | ? |
| Mars Express | 2023 | The animated sci-fi noir thriller is set on a colonized Mars in the 23rd century, where private investigators Aline Ruby and Carlos Rivera are tasked with solving interconnected cases involving missing persons and rogue androids. |
| Mars Needs Moms | 2011 | In the animated film, a boy's mother is abducted by Martians, and he pursues them back to Mars to rescue her. |
| The Martian | 2015 | A human mission to Mars goes awry, and an astronaut is presumed dead and left behind on the planet by his crew. He fights to survive in the harsh environment and to signal to others that he is still alive. Upon discovering his signal, NASA, scientists all around Earth, and his crew members collaborate to find a way to rescue him. |
| Martian Land | 2015 | The direct-to-video science fiction film is set on Mars in the future, and humans live in domed cities that become threatened by sandstorms. |
| A Message from Mars | 1913 | The ruler of Mars sends a subject to Earth to reform a stingy man. |
| Mission Mars | 1968 | Three astronauts travel to Mars on an expedition but encounter strange forces on the planet. |
| Mission to Mars | 2000 | A rescue mission is sent to Mars to recover the sole survivor of a scientific expedition, and the astronauts learn that Mars is not a dead planet. |
| Moonshot | 2022 | In the science-fiction romantic comedy, two college students sneak onto a space shuttle to a terraformed Mars to be with their significant others, with the film's third act taking place on Mars. |
| Mr. Nobody | 2009 | ? |
| Our Heavenly Bodies | 1925 | ? |
| Princess of Mars | 2009 | In a modern-day update of the 1912 novel A Princess of Mars, the direct-to-DVD film features former U.S. Army sniper John Carter being transported to Mars and becoming involved in a conflict among its inhabitants. |
| Red Planet | 2000 | When a terraforming project on Mars goes awry, a rescue mission is sent to fix the system but crash-lands on the planet. |
| Robinson Crusoe on Mars | 1964 | The film, based on the survival story Robinson Crusoe, features an astronaut stranded on Mars. |
| Rocket to Mars | 1946 | ? |
| RocketMan | 1997 | In the comedy film, a substitute astronaut joins the first human mission to Mars with the goal of finding fossils. |
| Rocketship X-M | 1950 | Rocketship Expedition-Moon is accidentally hurtled beyond Luna on a trajectory towards Mars. Ship and crew touch down briefly on the Red Planet, where they encounter the survivors of a nuclear war. |
| Santa Claus Conquers the Martians | 1964 | In the comedy film, Martians kidnap Santa Claus and two children and bring them back to Mars. |
| Settlers | 2021 | The Western-themed film features a couple and their daughter settled on Mars and keeping a secret from her about their life. |
| Sky Larks | 1934 | ? |
| The Space Between Us | 2017 | In the science fiction film, humanity successfully colonizes Mars, and a colonist gives birth to a boy who ultimately travels back to Earth. |
| Special Report: Journey to Mars | 1996 | The first mission to Mars is accompanied by a reporter that does regular television reports. The commander of the mission is discovered to have been infected by a group against the mission. He survives and in the last scene he sees something on the surface of Mars that is not shown to the audience. |
| Species II | 1998 | In the science fiction horror film, the beginning shows a human mission to Mars in which alien ooze infects the first American man to walk on Mars. The astronaut unknowingly brings the infection back to Earth, where it spreads to others. |
| Star Crystal | 1986 | The science fiction film introduces an expedition to Mars, on which scientists recover an alien egg that they take back to their ship. |
| Starship Troopers: Traitor of Mars | 2017 | The animated science fiction film, one of several in the Starship Troopers franchise, features a demoted general stationed on Mars who has to train poorly-performing troopers. The military has to confront alien bugs that decide to target Mars. |
| Stranded (Spanish: Náufragos) | 2001 | A human mission to Mars crash-lands on the planet, stranding the crew. |
| Total Recall | 1990 | Loosely based on the 1966 Philip K. Dick story "We Can Remember It for You Wholesale", a man recovers the memory of being a secret agent and travels to Mars to figure out his true identity. |
| Tom and Jerry: Blast Off to Mars | 2005 | ? |
| A Trip to Mars | 1910 | The short film, 4 minutes in length, stars a professor who uses an antigravity powder to float to Mars, where he encounters aggressive trees and a giant creature. The creature then sends him back to Earth, but the powder spills and the whole laboratory flies in the sky. |
| A Trip to Mars | 1918 | An adventurer travels to Mars in a ship of his own construction, and finds the planet's inhabitants living harmoniously. |
| Trip to Mars | 1924 | ? |
| Up to Mars | 1930 | ? |
| The War of the Worlds | 1953 | ? |
| Watchmen | 2009 | In the superhero film mainly set on Earth, the superpowered being Dr. Manhattan exiles himself to Mars after being accused of causing cancer in those in his company. |
| The Wizard of Mars | 1965 | A rocketship crew is stranded on Mars, and they travel through a ruined civilization before they find a yellow road that leads to a Martian city and a wizard who can help them. |

== See also ==
- Mars in fiction
- Moon in fiction § Film

=== Related television ===
- Away, a 2020 science fiction drama streaming television series
- Cowboy Bebop, a 1998 Japanese animated television series predominantly set on Mars, post-terraformation
- Babylon 5 (season 4) – TV series with several season 4 episodes set on Mars
- For All Mankind, а 2019 television series
- The Expanse, a 2016 television series featuring a colonized solar system in which Earth and an independent Mars compete for the resources of the asteroid belt
- The First, a 2018 drama series
- Mars, a 2016 six-part docudrama television miniseries by National Geographic
- The Martian Chronicles, a 1980 television miniseries
- Missions, a 2017 French television series
- Race to Mars, a 2007 television miniseries
- Stars on Mars, a 2023 reality competition series

=== Indirectly related films ===
- Abbott and Costello Go to Mars, a 1953 film in which the comedy duo end up on Venus instead of Mars
- Capricorn One, a 1977 government conspiracy thriller film about a Mars landing hoax
