= Rich Ross =

American businessperson

- Education: University of Pennsylvania; Fordham University School of Law
- Occupation: Former President of Discovery Channel Discovery Channel
- Spouse: Adam Sanderson

Rich Ross is the former Group President of Discovery Channel and Science Channel. Earlier in his tenure at Discovery he also oversaw Animal Planet and Velocity (TV network). Previously he was the Chief Executive Officer of Shine America, responsible for commercial strategy of the Shine Group in the United States. He was also the president of entertainment at Disney Channel, and chairman of Walt Disney Studios. When Ross was named Chairman of Walt Disney Studios in 2009, he became the first openly gay studio chief.

Ross discussed his plans for Discovery Channel on January 8, 2015 at the 2015 Television Critics Association press tour. His strategy included hiring key senior level executives to oversee documentaries and specials, as well as scripted programming. He had the highest-rated Shark Week ever and its most-watched July ever.

== Early life ==
Ross grew up in Eastchester, New York. His father, Marty, was a garment-industry executive, and his mother, Harriet, was a former teacher turned real-estate agent. Ross is Jewish. He graduated from Eastchester High School. When he was 19, he was hired to work in the mail room at the William Morris Agency in New York. He graduated from the University of Pennsylvania in 1983 with a Bachelor of Arts in International Relations and English. In 1986, he earned his J.D. degree from Fordham University.

== Career ==
Ross's first job in the entertainment industry was as a talent booker at Nickelodeon. He built the Nickelodeon/Nick at Nite talent relations department and oversaw casting and talent booking for the network's shows including Clarissa Explains It All and Hey Dude. He served as executive producer of Nickelodeon's Kids' Choice Awards. As vice president of program enterprises at Nickelodeon, Ross was involved in all original-programming deals and launched Nick News with Linda Ellerbee into syndication. He was a part of the launch team for Nickelodeon's first international network, Nickelodeon UK. He joined FX Networks in 1993 and was a member of the executive team that launched the cable network.

=== Disney ===
In 1996, Ross joined Disney Channel in programming and production as a senior vice president, becoming general manager and executive vice president in 1999. In 2002 he became president of entertainment for Disney Channel, before being named president of Disney Channels Worldwide in 2004, where he oversaw the Disney Channel, Disney XD, Playhouse Disney, Disney Cinemagic, Hungama, GXT, Jetix, and Radio Disney brands. He is credited with establishing Disney's global kids' TV business as the prime entertainment source for the tween market with shows like Hannah Montana, Lizzie McGuire, Wizards of Waverly Place, Shake It Up,The Suite Life of Zack & Cody and The Suite Life on Deck, That's So Raven and Phineas and Ferb. He launched the highly successful Disney Channel Original Movie franchise that produced the worldwide hit High School Musical series, as well as the Camp Rock and The Cheetah Girls series. Popular Playhouse Disney shows developed during his tenure include Handy Manny and Mickey Mouse Clubhouse.

Ross was named Chairman of Walt Disney Studios in October 2009, overseeing Disney's film, music, and theatrical groups. Films released during Ross' tenure include the billion-dollar hits Pirates of the Caribbean: On Stranger Tides, Disney's Alice in Wonderland and Disney-Pixar's Toy Story 3, which were three of the top 11 highest-grossing films of all time at the time of their release; Disney's The Muppets; DreamWorks Studios' The Help; and Disney-Pixar's Cars 2.

Ross' tenure as Chairman was marred by two box-office flops. The 2011 animated movie Mars Needs Moms had a production budget of $150 million and made $42.8 million in box office and DVD sales. The March 2012 opening of John Carter was another high-profile flop; John Carter had a production budget of $250 million and earned just over $69 million at the box office in North America. Due to the film's weak North American performance compared to its high production and marketing costs, Disney expected the film would generate a loss of about $200 million during its second fiscal quarter, although its box office strength outside North America led some analysts to speculate that the write-down would be significantly less than expected.

Ross left Disney on April 20, 2012, with the underperformance of John Carter and Mars Needs Moms cited as reasons for his departure. It was reported that Ross sought to blame Pixar for John Carter, which prompted key Pixar executives to turn against Ross who already had alienated many within the studio.

=== Shine America ===
Rich Ross became the Chief Executive Officer for Shine America in January 2013. He was responsible for the ongoing commercial strategy of the Shine Group in the United States, overseeing production, distribution and marketing of original programming across broadcast, cable and digital platforms.

=== Discovery ===
Rich Ross was with Discovery Communications from 2015 to 2018. He became President of Discovery Channel in January 2015 and in August of the same year was named Group President of Discovery Channel, Animal Planet and Science Channel. In January 2017, he was also named President of Velocity, a channel that focuses on cars, sports and other topics targeted at men. He oversaw creative and brand strategy, development, production, marketing and all day-to-day operations for the four networks across all platforms that includes digital and social media.

In the wake of Discovery's acquisition of Scripps Interactive in 2018, Ross departed the company. In contrast to Ross's reported intention to bring more scripted programming to the network, CEO David Zaslav reaffirmed the organization's commitment to unscripted programming, characterizing the genre as more profitable and viable for Discovery. Notably, the premiere of Manhunt: Unabomber, a scripted "tentpole" program produced during Ross's tenure, averaged 1.3 million viewers, -17% lower than the unscripted program that aired one hour earlier. Ross was replaced by Nancy Daniels, head of TLC. Susanna Dinnage was named President of Animal Planet Global.

== Personal life ==
He is married to his longtime partner Adam Sanderson. In February 2017, he was selected to join the Board of Overseers for the School of Arts and Sciences at the University of Pennsylvania.
