= Tars Tarkas =

Fictional character from the Barsoom franchise

- Barsoom character
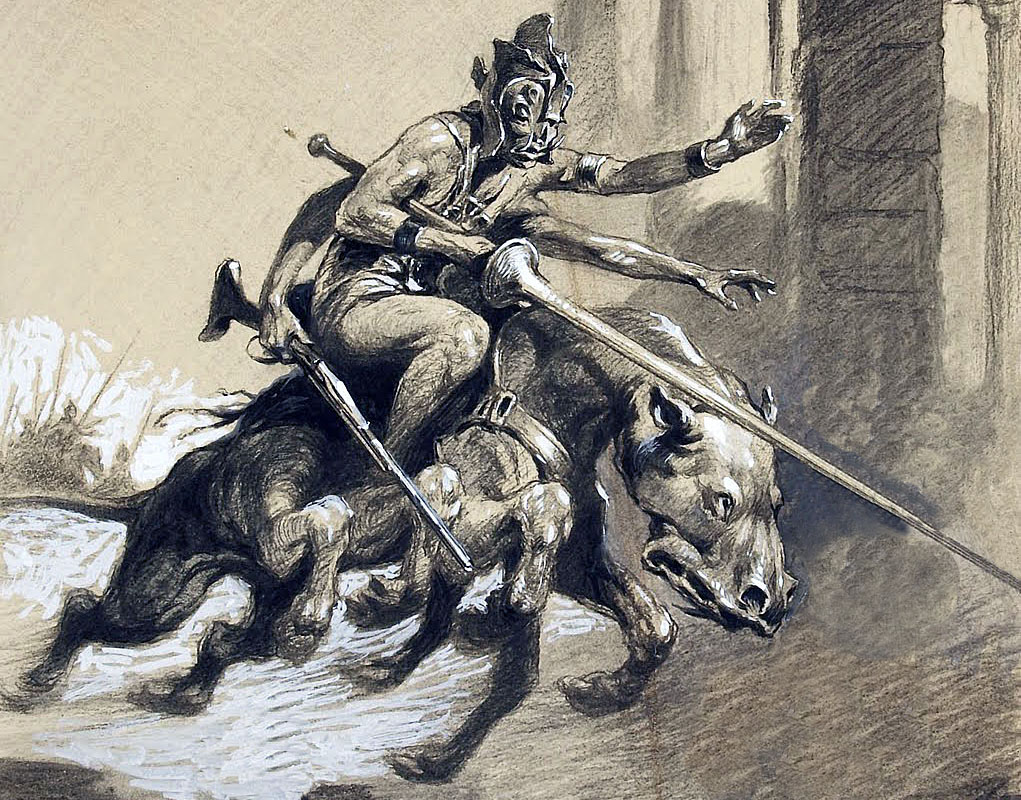
- Green Martian on his thoat. Extract from art by James Allen St. John from Thuvia, Maid of Mars
- First appearance: A Princess of Mars
- Created by: Edgar Rice Burroughs
- Portrayed by: Matt Lasky (Princess of Mars); Willem Dafoe (John Carter)

In-universe information
- Species: Martian
- Gender: Male
- Title: King

Tars Tarkas is a fictional character in Edgar Rice Burroughs' Barsoom series. A great warrior and leader among his people (the brutal and mirthless Tharks), he possesses a sense of compassion and empathy uncharacteristic of his race. In the first novel, A Princess of Mars, with the help of the newly arrived Earth man John Carter, he becomes Jeddak, or king, of the Tharks.

Tarkas is the first Barsoomian John Carter encounters when he appears on Mars. When Tarkas discovers Carter inspecting the Tharks' incubator (in which the tribe's eggs are sealed for up to five years prior to hatching), he attempts to kill Carter. The attempt fails, and Tarkas instead takes Carter prisoner and transports him back to the nearby dead city, in which a group of Tharks have taken up temporary residence. When Carter kills one of the Tharks in combat, Tarkas informs him he has gained his opponent's rank and possessions.

Over the course of the next weeks, Carter comes to respect Tarkas for his abilities as a warrior and statesman. Carter also discovers that Tarkas has a secret: long ago he fell in love and had a child (egg) with his lover, Gozava, two actions punishable by death in the Tharks' culture. Tarkas and Gozava hid the egg and incubated it in secret. Tarkas was ordered away on a long military expedition, and when the child finally hatched, Gozava managed to mingle her child with the newborn children from the communal incubator. Gozava's maternity (although not the child's identity) was discovered, and she was tortured and killed by the Tharkian chieftain Tal Hajus for the crime of childbearing. However, even under torture she refused to reveal the name of the child's father. The daughter's name is Sola, and she befriends Carter and tells him the story of her birth and the identity of her father.

When he learns this, Carter's sympathy and admiration for Tarkas increases, and he resolves to do all he can to help. Over time, the two become friends, and Carter, after escaping the Tharks in the course of his pursuit of Dejah Thoris, returns to them and helps engineer a duel between Tarkas and Tal Hajus, the Jeddak of Thark. Tarkas wins the duel, and according to Tharkian law becomes Jeddak. In exchange for Carter's help, Tarkas becomes one of Carter's closest allies. He appears in a number of the other novels in the series.

== Film ==
- Tars Tarkas was played by Matt Lasky in the 2009 direct-to-DVD film Princess of Mars.
- Willem Dafoe portrays Tarkas in the 2012 film John Carter.

== Tributes ==
The Finnish filmmaker Aarne Tarkas (originally Aarne Saastamoinen) was an aficionado of the John Carter books and took his name from Tars Tarkas.

In Kage Baker's 2003 novel The Empress of Mars, human colonists on Mars have a Christmas-like celebration, and a settler appears costumed as "Uncle Tars Tarkas", giving gifts to children as if he were Father Christmas or Santa Claus.

The robot character TARS in the 2014 film Interstellar was named after Tars Tarkas.
