= Yambo (writer) =

Italian writer, journalist, and filmmaker (1876–1943)

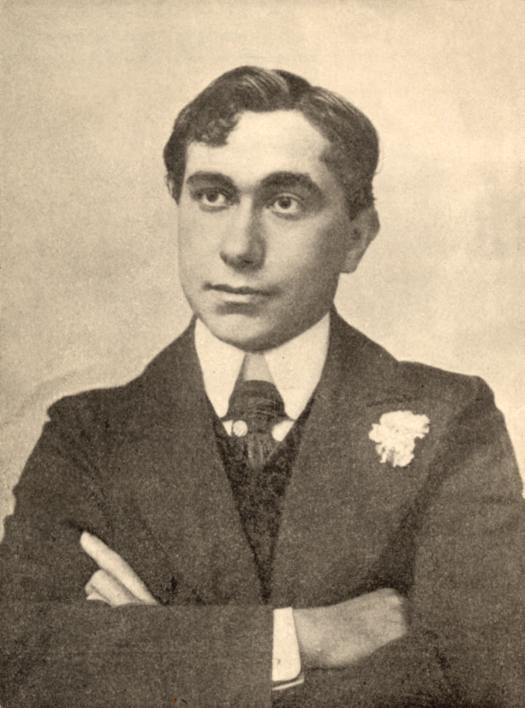
- Born: Enrico Novelli; 5 June 1876; Pisa, Italy
- Died: 30 December 1943 (aged 67); Florence, Italy

Enrico Novelli, writing as Yambo (5 June 1876 – 30 December 1943), was an Italian writer, journalist, and filmmaker.

Enrico Novelli was born on 5 June 1876 in Pisa, the son of Ermete Novelli. He worked in newspapers, beginning at La Sera (possibly Corriere della Sera) in Milan. Between 1927 and 1942, he ran a paper in Florence called Il nuovo giornale di Firenze.

Novelli wrote children's books under the pen name "Yambo". Le avventure di Ciuffettino (1902) is his best known work.

He died on 30 December 1943 in Florence.
