= Tharks =

Fictional race that appear in the Barsoom universe

- Barsoom race
- First appearance: A Princess of Mars (1912)

In-universe information
- Home world: Mars
- Type: Green Martian
- Affiliation: John Carter

Thark or Tharks are a fictional tribe of fierce Green Martian warriors on the fictional planet of Barsoom (based on Mars), created by Edgar Rice Burroughs and first featured in the 1917 novel A Princess of Mars.

== General description ==
In the books, Green Martians are around 15 feet tall, with tusks protruding from their mouths, green skin, and with double torso, each with its own set of arms. In A Princess of Mars, with the help of the newly arrived John Carter from Earth, Tars Tarkas becomes a Jeddak (king) of the Tharks. The Tharks and Tars Tarkas are featured in many of the ten Martian novels written by Burroughs, in toys (as recently as the 1990s), in John Carter, Warlord of Mars comics published by both DC Comics and Marvel Comics in the 1970s, and in comic strips by John Coleman Burroughs (son of Edgar Rice Burroughs).

Thark is a Green Martian tribe and kingdom, whose name comes from the deserted city they have occupied as their capital. Thark was originally one of the many cities left behind by the Orovars, and apparently one of the more important of the Orovar cities, but when the Orovar died out, a large coalition of Green hordes took it over and used the name for their coalition.

Sociologically, the Tharks are an interesting study in contradictions. On the one hand, they, like all Greens, are warlike and cruel, and under the reign of Tal Hajus, there were serious considerations about the effectiveness of rape as a tactic for demoralizing female captives. On the other hand, they have a strong code of honor to which even Jeddaks must adhere. After Tal Hajus was killed by Tars Tarkas, and with the advice of the Earthman John Carter, the Tharks entered a new age in which base cruelty took a back seat to more diplomatic means for gaining resources.

The Tharks have long been at war with the Warhoons, whose savagery is unparalleled even among the Green hordes. Tharks also possess a great hatred for Zodanga, as Jeddak Than Kosis made some very serious efforts to wipe the Tharks out by attacking their incubators.

It was among the Tharks that John Carter earned his earliest honors and met the princess Dejah Thoris.

== Notable characters ==
- Tars Tarkas, warrior who found John Carter, and who eventually became Jeddak of Thark; he is also the father of Sola. Tars Tarkas is unusual among his savage race for his ability to love and form friendships, who is much affected by the loss of his lover while being away on a raid. He befriends John Carter and fights many battles at his side. Carter helps him become Jeddak of the Green Martians and negotiates an alliance between the Green Martians and the city state of Helium which results in the destruction of their enemies the city of Zodanga at the end of the novel.
- Dotar Sojat, Jed from Jasoom; a name by which John Carter became known among Lorqas Ptomel's community of Tharks; it is a composite name which he inherited from two Tharks that he killed in separate combats
- Sola, daughter of Tars Tarkas and Gozava and a close friend of John Carter and Dejah Thoris
- Sarkoja, elder woman of Thark,
- Lorqas Ptomel, leader of the community of Tharks who first encountered John Carter
- Tal Hajus, the bloated, cruel and corrupt Jeddak (king) of the Tharks; killed by Tars Tarkas, who replaces him as Jeddak of the Tharks.
- Sojat, a chieftain who was killed by John Carter after he struck Dejah Thoris
- Zad, a young warrior who tried unsuccessfully to kill John Carter and instead ended up dead.

== Use by other authors ==
- Tharks are one of several fictional Martians who appear in Larry Niven's 1999 short story collection Rainbow Mars.
- In Alan Moore's The League of Extraordinary Gentlemen, Volume II, Tharks are among the alliance of native Martians fighting to drive the Mollusc Invaders off of Barsoom.
- In Karl Schroeder's 2014 novel Lockstep, set over 14,000 years in the future, Mars has been terraformed and is renamed Barsoom. It is mentioned that, in addition to the human settlers, there are genetically engineered Tharks living on the world. A time period called the "second Thark Flowering" is also mentioned. In the 2018 sequel The Million, the Tharks are briefly mentioned as the only civilization on Mars that does not periodically go into suspended animation.
