= The Rip-Off (film) =

Film by Antonio Margheriti

The Rip Off
- Directed by: Antonio Margheriti
- Screenplay by: Paul Costello; Marc Princi; Giovanni Simonelli
- Story by: Paul Costello; Marc Princi; Giovanni Simonelli
- Produced by: Turi Vasile
- Starring: Lee Van Cleef; Karen Black; Edward Albert; Robert Alda; Lionel Stander
- Cinematography: Sergio D'Offizi
- Edited by: Roberto Sterbini
- Music by: Paolo Vasile
- Production companies: Laser Film; Dritte Centama Gbth
- Release dates: 25 October 1978 (Stockholm, Sweden); 1979 (Italy)
- Running time: 100 minutes
- Countries: Italy; West Germany

The Rip-Off (Italian: Controrapina), also known as The Squeeze and Diamond Thieves, is a 1978 crime action film directed by Antonio Margheriti. It was Margheriti's third collaboration with actor Lee Van Cleef, after previously directing him in The Stranger and the Gunfighter and Take a Hard Ride.

== Plot ==
Retired safe-cracker Chris Gretchko is coaxed out of comfortable retirement by Jeff Olafson, the impulsive son of a former accomplice, who begs him to help steal an undocumented shipment of diamonds to satiate Van Stratten, a New York City crime boss whose mistress, Jessica, has been seeing Jeff on the side.

Chris subsequently recruits his old friend, pawn shop owner Sam, who agrees to fence the diamonds afterward. When they learn Van Stratten intends to cut them out of the deal, Chris and Jeff plot a countermeasure, resulting in Jeff getting thrown in jail to give him plausible deniability, and Chris convalescing in a safe house after getting shot during the heist. Clarisse, an eccentric neighbor in the building, discovers Chris, and agrees to help tend his injuries and lie to police who come looking for him. However, Captain Donati begins to piece together the events, and all the involved parties find their lives in danger.

== Cast ==
- Lee Van Cleef as Chris
- Karen Black as Clarisse
- Edward Albert as Jeff
- Robert Alda as Captain Donati
- Lionel Stander as Sam
- Angelo Infanti as Inspector
- Antonella Murgia as Jessica
- Peter Carsten as Van Stratten
- Ron van Clief as Duke
- Roy Brocksmith as Warehouse owner

== Production ==
The Rip-Off was filmed in Hamburg and on location in New York City and New Jersey from December 1977 to February 1978.

== Release ==
The Rip-Off was released theatrically in Stockholm, Sweden on October 25, 1978. It as released later in Italy in 1979. The film has been released in the United States under the titles The Rip-Off and The Squeeze.

== Notes ==
=== References ===
- Curti, Roberto (2013). Italian Crime Filmography, 1968-1980. McFarland. ISBN 978-1476612089.
