= The Grand Duel =

1972 film by Giancarlo Santi

- Directed by: Giancarlo Santi
- Screenplay by: Ernesto Gastaldi
- Starring: Lee Van Cleef; Peter O'Brien; Marc Mazza; Jess Hahn; Horst Frank; Klaus Grünberg; Anthony Vernon; Dominique Darel
- Cinematography: Mario Vulpiani
- Edited by: Roberto Perpignani
- Music by: Sergio Bardotti; Luis Enríquez Bacalov
- Production companies: Mount Street Film; Terra-Filmkunst GmbH; Corona Filmproduktion GmbH; Société Nouvelle de Cinématographie
- Distributed by: Titanus (Italy); Constantin Film (West Germany); Société Nouvelle de Cinématographie (France)
- Release date: 29 December 1972
- Running time: 98 minutes
- Countries: Italy; West Germany; France
- Language: Italian

The Grand Duel (Italian: Il Grande duello), also known as Storm Rider and The Big Showdown, is a 1972 Italian-language spaghetti Western film directed by Giancarlo Santi, who had previously worked as Sergio Leone's assistant director on The Good, the Bad and the Ugly and Once Upon a Time in the West. The film stars Lee Van Cleef as a sheriff who seeks justice for a man accused of murder.

== Plot ==
Philip Wermeer has escaped from prison where he serves a sentence for the murder of Ebenezer Saxon, the patriarch of Saxon city, who in his turn is believed to be behind the murder of Wermeer's father. Wermeer is holed up in Gila Bend by a swarm of bounty killers, who want his $3,000 reward, posted by Saxon's three sons David, Eli and Adam. A sheriff named Clayton arrives on a stagecoach and bosses his way through the cordon set up by the local lawmen. While walking to the saloon, he performs actions that tip off Wermeer as to where some of the besiegers are hidden (like throwing a lit match so a man hidden in hay has to put it out). Wermeer makes it to the saloon, where Clayton, who has counted Wermeer's shots and knows that he is out of bullets, arrests him. Hole, a spokesman for the bounty killers, calls on Wermeer to surrender. A shot rings out and Clayton emerges dragging the "dead" convict. They argue that Clayton is a sheriff and therefore he cannot collect bounty, and that he instead should give up the body. The disagreement develops into a gunfight. Wermeer jumps up on a horse and escapes, pursued by the pack (though not Clayton). Wermeer makes the bounty hunters follow his horse, then hitches a ride with the stagecoach, where he finds Clayton among the passengers.

When the group stay the night at Silver Bells, Wermeer goes for a shotgun hanging on the wall, but Clayton stops him. A drunken stationmaster assures the gun is empty, but Clayton retorts: "Never consider a gun empty". Then he and Wermeer play cards, Wermeer betting his $3,000 bounty. Wermeer wins and Clayton promises to take him to Saxon city as he wants. Wermeer steals a revolver from Clayton's bag, but is told that it is empty. Wermeer repeats Clayton's earlier saying and pulls the trigger, but Clayton shows him the bullet, taking it out of his mouth. Wermeer tries to leave, but Clayton shoots the door, this time with the other five bullets. Meanwhile, the bounty hunters led by Hole surround the house. They give Wermeer thirty seconds. He and Clayton are inside with Elisabeth, a female passenger who has earlier shown interest in Wermeer. Clayton tells her that Wermeer is innocent and that he saw who did it, but if Wermeer walks out the door he will never know. Wermeer gives himself up. Hole and two of the bounty hunters now kill the others in their pack, then ride off with Wermeer.

Clayton finds them beating and questioning Wermeer in a waterfall, asking where the silver of his father is and offering to let him go if he tells. Clayton shoots off the rope and liberates him. Wermeer asks if he is still a prisoner. When Clayton says no, he holds a gun against Clayton and rides off to Saxon city on the latter's horse. After arriving Wermeer confronts the Saxon sons, Adam and Eli. He accuses Eli (who is the town's sheriff) and asks who killed his father. We also learn that Hole was sent by Eli to find out who really killed the old man Saxon. Clayton arrives and demands that the Saxons reopen Wermeer's case. Wermeer sends word to his friends and people loyal to his father to gather at the silver mine. A duel between Hole and Wermeer is supervised by Clayton after he reveals that it was Hole who killed Wermeer's father, following orders from Ebenezer Saxon. An ambusher is there helping Hole, but Wermeer shoots him without Clayton interfering. (In a German-language version, the dying Hole says he killed Wermeer because the latter refused to share the silver.)

David Saxon, the oldest of the brothers and the one responsible of running the town, orders Adam to stop the people heading to the silver mine. Shortly after, Adam massacres Wermeer's followers with hidden explosives and a machine gun. He also kills his own men, following his brother David's instructions to not leave any witnesses. Meanwhile David meets with Clayton, who says that they both know who killed the old man Saxon. David offers $25.000 if he and Wermeer leave town. Clayton relays the offer that the charge will be dropped. Wermeer replies that the Saxons made the offer because "dead people don't need a leader", and reveals the wagon in which he carries the bodies of those killed by Adam. Adam shoots him from a window, though Elisabeth, who arrived in town to marry Adam, cries out a warning. Clayton escapes during the gunfight.

In the morning, Wermeer is to be hanged. Clayton says he knows who is the real killer. David wants the hanging to continue but Eli says that he must know. Clayton confesses that he himself did it, explaining that Ebenezer Saxon killed Wermeer's father, and that David Saxon bought the judge who sentenced Philip Wermeer and stripped Clayton of his title of Sheriff after he stood in trial to declare him innocent, so justice could only be done "the Saxon way". Clayton also denounces the massacre at the silver mine, and the Saxons agree to meet Clayton at the cattle pens. At the confrontation, when Clayton approaches, David says that the three must draw first to overcome Clayton's faster and expert gunplay. Wermeer, from a distance, shoots off Clayton's hat so that he draws first. It works and Clayton reacts by killing the three men and only getting a small wound. Wermeer picks up his hat, gun, and star, and says that Clayton can now go back to being a sheriff. Wermeer leaves for Mexico with Elisabeth, not caring about the silver. The old man from the stagecoach that carried the initial group, now friends with Wermeer, drives them down the road, while Clayton goes his own way.

== Cast ==
- Lee Van Cleef as Sheriff Clayton
- Alberto Dentice as Philip Wermeer / Philip Premier (credited as Peter O'Brien)
- Jess Hahn as Bighorse, The Stage Driver
- Horst Frank as David Saxon / Ebenezer Saxon
- Marc Mazza as Sheriff Eli Saxon
- Klaus Grünberg as Adam Saxon
- Antonio Casale as "Hole", The Head Bounty Hunter (credited as Antony Vernon)
- Dominique Darel as Elisabeth
- Alessandra Cardini as Anita, One of Madame Oro's Girls (credited as Sandra Cardini)
- Elvira Cortese as Madame Oro
- Memè Perlini as Henchman
- Remo Capitani as Bounty Hunter (credited as Ray O'Connor)
- Angelo Susani as Bounty Hunter
- Franco Fantasia as Bounty Hunter
- Ottorino Polentini as Bounty Hunter

== Reception ==
In his investigation of narrative structures in Spaghetti Western films, Fridlund writes that the relationship between Wermeer and Clayton before their arrival to Saxon City follows the stories of the (commercially more successful) Spaghetti Western films Death Rides a Horse and Day of Anger, about the relationship between an older gunfighter and a younger protagonist, and he further traces the root of this type of plot to the play between the younger and the older bounty killer in For a Few Dollars More. In all four films the older party is played by Lee Van Cleef. Subsequently, Wermeer's return to his home town and quest for the truth about the death of his father, and the massacre of innocents are closer to what happens in films like Massacre Time and Texas, Adios that are more influenced by another genre highlight, Django.

The film's music was composed by future Academy Award winner Luis Enríquez Bacalov. The film's title score was later used in Quentin Tarantino's film Kill Bill: Volume 1.

== Release ==
Wild East released this alongside Beyond the Law under its American title, The Grand Duel, on an out-of-print limited edition R0 NTSC DVD in 2005. In 2013 Blue Underground re-released the film, again under its American title, in a newly transferred and fully restored R0 NTSC DVD. It was later released on Blu-ray by Mill Creek Entertainment as a double-feature with Keoma utilizing the same restored print.
