= Al Hoosman =

American boxer and actor (1918–1968)

- Born: Alston J Hoosman; Waterloo, Iowa, United States
- Died: October 25, 1968 (aged 50); Munich, Bavaria, West Germany
- Occupations: Boxer, actor
- Years active: 1930s to 1940s (boxer); 1950s to 1960s (actor)
- Known for: Founding the organization CAUSE to help mixed-race children in Germany

Al Hoosman a.k.a. Al Hoosmann was former serviceman, boxer and actor. During the 1950s and 1960s he acted in a number of films, including The Phantom of the Big Tent , The Avenger, Oriental Nights, and Beyond the Law. The main body of his film work was in Germany where he ended up living.

== Background ==
Al Hoosman went to Washington Grade School and then on to East Junior High where he stayed until the 10th grade. Leaving school that early in 1938 was a disappointment to Leonard Raffensperger and Harry Sievers who had aspirations for Hoosman to pursue football and wrestling as a heavyweight. For the next three years he boxed for Pinkie George at the Electric park and other cities around Iowa. He was also working at the Rath Packing Company at the time.

Al Hoosman joined the army in 1940. During the second world war, He was stationed in Mount Isa, Queensland, Australia. Known as "Big Al", he was well known and respected around the town. While there he was a military policeman.

In 1943, Hoosman was thought to be the best heavyweight boxer in Australia. On 13 December that year, he was one of the boxers that fought at the Brisbane Stadium. He was also a sparring partner of Joe Louis and was said to be one of his best sparring partners.

Following Hoosman's boxing career he went to Germany in 1949. There he found some work in film and television. About two years later he had a leading role in the film Toxi playing a Negro G.I.

At one stage in the early 1950s, the U.S. Army had hired Hoosman to teach self-defense to troops stationed in Germany.

Hoosman founded the association to help colored and parentless children. His organization CAUSE, founded in 1958 was to help the German mixed-race children who were fathered by African American servicemen.

Hoosman was also something of a singer. It was reported by Jet in the 20 December 1951 issue that Hoosman with his bearded guitarist accompanist would lay audiences in the isles with his version of "Enmal am Rhine" (Father Rhine). According to the July 24, 1952 issue of Jet, Hoosman was crooning in a Berlin nightclub. He once auditioned as a singer for Count Basie in the late 1940s. Basie had actually earlier taken out time to catch Hoosman's bout on January 9, 1948.

== Boxing ==
In 1939, Al Hoosman won the Golden Gloves championship in Oakland, California. In May 1946, Hoosman caught the media's attention when he was sparring with Joe Louis on the 28th of that month. Hoosman was his sparring partner and would usually just go a round with the champion. During the round, Hoosman was repeatedly landing left and right hooks on Louis. He also made Louis miss a lot and with them going toe to toe, he was performing better. Hoosman jumped out of the ring when the round was over but the trainer Manny Seamon called out to him to go another round. Hoosman wanted to go back in later but Louis said that he wanted him back in now. Hoosman held Louis in the second round and thanked him when it was over. Earlier that month Hoosman had given Louis a bloody nose in sparring match.

Hoosman's humor was obvious during his boxing career but he also seemed to have serious aspirations to be a singer. As reported by the 6 January 1946 edition of the Nevada State Journal, Hoosman said that he wanted to capitalize on his singing and not his boxing. And he said that he had to box so he could get the names of the "Singing Fighter" or the "Crooning Killer" etc. much to the annoyance of his manager James Joy Johnston. Manager Johnston recalled how Hoosman was an all-round athlete in high school, then won the Golden Gloves, then while in Australia knocked out the Australian champion in nine rounds. He said "So they put them together again and Al knocks of his bloody head in seven. Now he wants to sing".

Having fought his way up to sixth place on the list of U.S. heavyweights of the boxing press, he fought Joe Louis in Oakland California where he was knocked out by Louis.

== Film career ==
He played the part of Totti in the 1953 German adventure film Jonny Saves Nebrador that starred Hans Albers, Margot Hielscher, Peter Pasetti, Ferdinand Anton and Trude Hesterberg.

Hooseman played the police sergeant in the 1967 film Jack of Diamonds that starred George Hamilton, Joseph Cotten, Marie Laforêt and Maurice Evans.

Hoosman had a prominent role as Al a.k.a. Sampson in the 1968 film, Beyond the Law which starred Lee Van Cleef, Antonio Sabato, Gordon Mitchell, Lionel Stander and Bud Spencer. His character Al / Sampson like Preacher (played by Lionel Stander) was a partner of Billy Joe Cudlip (played by Lee Van Cleef). This trio of petty thieves can't believe their luck when they manage to get $25,000 in their scam. The money was the payroll, intended for the workes of the Silver Town Mining Company. Things change and they become surprised that their partner Billy Joe was giving up his criminal ways.

== CAUSE organization ==
It was noted in the May 30, 1960 issue of music trade magazine The Billboard that a new friend and backer of Hoosman was Nat King Cole.

It was reported by Jet in the magazine's February 8, 1962 issue that Hoosman had returned to the United States after an eleven-year absence. He was there to raise funds for his organization that provided relief for some of the 100,000 illegitimate children who were fathered by both Negro and White American servicemen. While there he visited the Johnson and Co. publishing offices in Chicago.

== Singing ==
Hoosman had been vocal about giving up boxing for singing. It was in 1946 when Hoosman was training for his fight with Billy Conn that he first met Count Basie. He auditioned for Basie and Basie was impressed with his vocal style but urged him not to give up boxing. It was reported in the December 13, 1947 edition of The Ohio State News that a few weeks back, Hoosman had visited the Count on a one nighter and had got up and sung a few numbers. He got a very enthusiastic response from the dance crowd. The newspaper also reported that Basie wanted him to fight his way up through the ranks to a championship bout with Joe Louis and then make his decision.

It was reported by Jet in the 28 May 1953 issue of Jet that Hoosman was heading back to the United States to appear in Porgy & Bess.

== Death ==
Al Hoosman died at age 50 on October 25, 1968, in Munich, Germany.
