= Luigi Vannucchi =

Italian actor

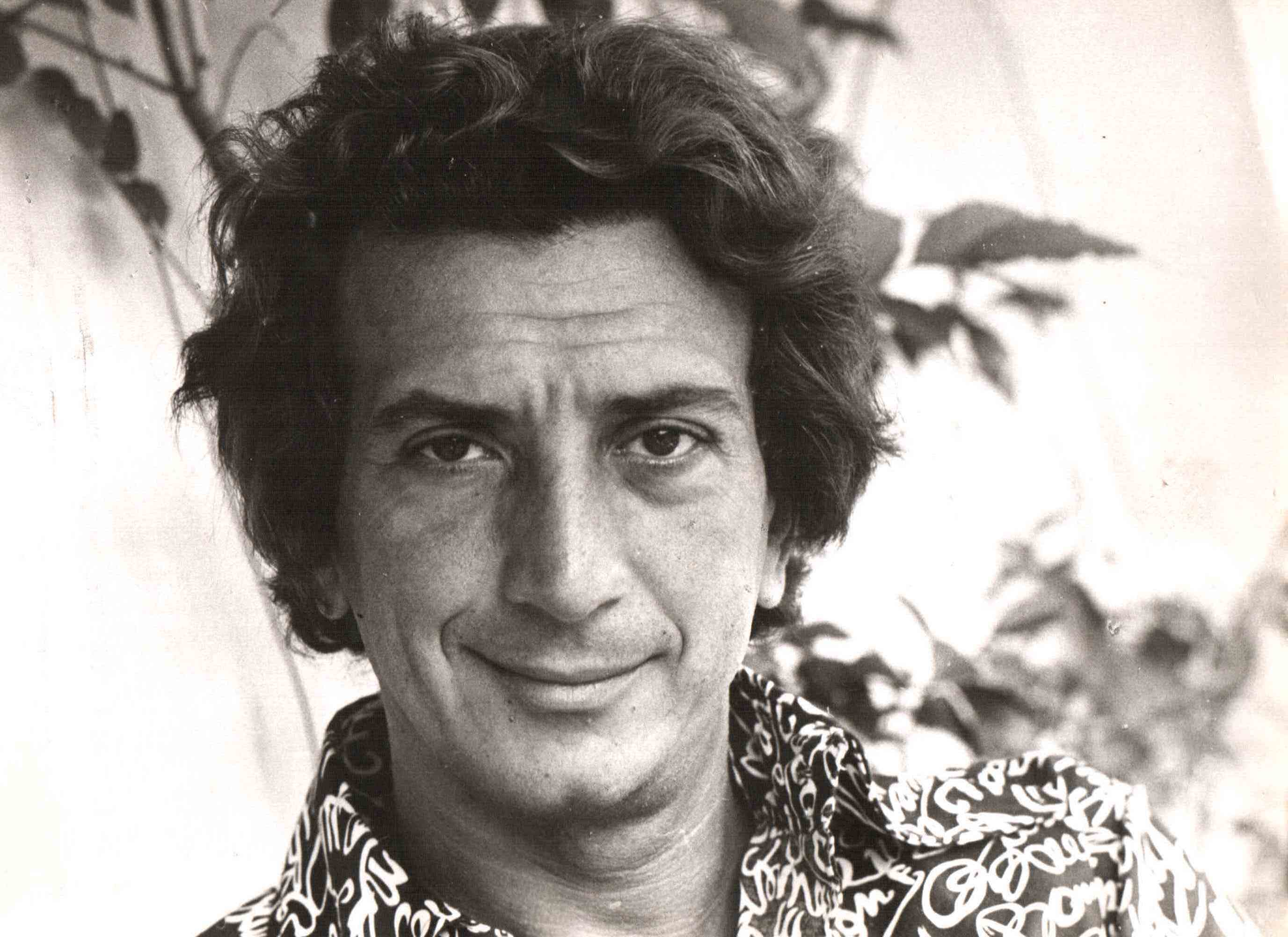
- Born: 25 November 1930; Caltanissetta
- Died: 30 August 1978 (aged 47); Rome
- Occupation: Actor

Luigi Vannucchi (25 November 1930 – 30 August 1978) was an Italian film, stage and television actor.

== Life and career ==
Born in Caltanissetta, Vannucchi graduated at Silvio d'Amico National Academy of Dramatic Arts in 1952 and shortly after entered the theatrical company of Vittorio Gassman. In 1958 he entered the Giorgio Strehler's company. From early 60's he also was very active as television actor, often in negative roles, in successful TV-series as A come Andromeda and I promessi sposi. His film career was less prolific, but however it includes notable titles as Mikhail Kalatozov's The Red Tent, Joseph Losey's The Assassination of Trotsky and Roberto Rossellini's Anno uno (in which he played Alcide De Gasperi).

== Death ==
His last work was the 1978 TV-series Il vizio assurdo (The absurd vice), in which he portrayed the suicidal writer Cesare Pavese. He committed suicide soon after.

== Filmography ==
Year	Title	Role	Notes
1955	Il conte Aquila		
1961	The Corsican Brothers	Luigi Sagona	
1965	Su e giù	Il dottor Lanfranchi	(segment "Questione di Principo")
1965	Johnny Yuma	Pedro	
1966	Pleasant Nights	Alfonso d'Este	
1966	The Devil in Love	Principe Franceschetto Cybo dell'Anguillara	
1967	The Tiger and the Pussycat	Company president	
1967	I giorni della violenza	Capt. Dan Clifford	
1967	Tiffany Memorandum	Brook	
1967	Domani non siamo più qui	Corrado	
1969	The Red Tent	Zappi	
1972	The Assassination of Trotsky	Ruiz	
1974	Anno uno	Alcide De Gasperi	
1975	Lovers Like Us	Vittori	
