= Lee Van Cleef =

American actor (1925–1989)

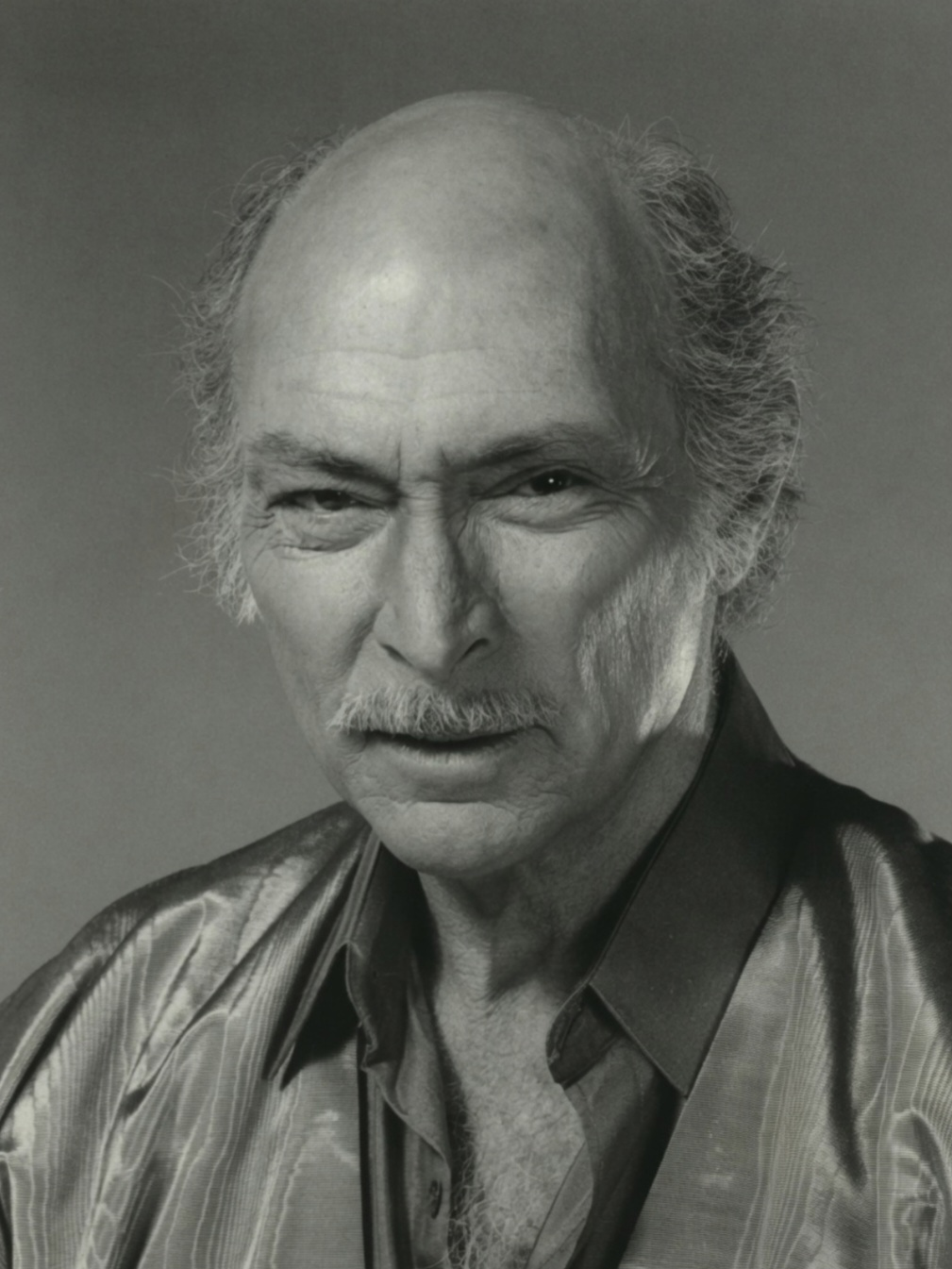
- Van Cleef in 1983
- Born: Clarence LeRoy Van Cleef Jr. January 9, 1925; Somerville, New Jersey, U.S.
- Died: December 16, 1989 (aged 64); Oxnard, California, U.S.
- Occupation: Actor
- Years active: 1952–1989
- Spouses: Patsy Ruth Kahle (m. 1943; div. 1958) Joan Marjorie Drane (m. 1960; div. 1974) Barbara Havelone (m. 1976)
- Children: 4
- Military career
- Branch: US Navy
- Service years: 1942–1946
- Rank: Sonarman First Class
- Unit: USS Incredible (AM-249)
- Conflicts: World War II: Battle of the Caribbean; Operation Dragoon
- Awards: Bronze Star; Good Conduct Medal; American Campaign Medal; European–African–Middle Eastern Campaign Medal; Asiatic–Pacific Campaign Medal; World War II Victory Medal
- Website: officialleevancleef.com

Clarence LeRoy Van Cleef Jr. (January 9, 1925 – December 16, 1989) was an American actor. He appeared in over 170 film and television roles in a career spanning nearly 40 years, but is best known as a star of spaghetti Westerns, holding starring roles in the Sergio Leone-directed Dollars Trilogy films, For a Few Dollars More (1965) and The Good, the Bad and the Ugly (1966). In 1983, he received a Golden Boot Award for his contribution to the Western film and television genre.

Van Cleef served in the United States Navy during World War II aboard the minesweeper USS Incredible, earning a Bronze Star for his actions. After acting on stage in regional theatre, he made his film debut in the Oscar-winning Western High Noon (1952) in a non-speaking outlaw cast role. With distinctive, angular features and a taciturn screen persona, Van Cleef was typecast as minor villain and supporting player in Westerns, film noir, and crime dramas. After suffering serious injuries in a 1958 car crash, Van Cleef needed months of recovery and lingering physical damage changed the types of roles he performed. He achieved stardom when Leone gave him the co-leading role in For a Few Dollars More (1965).

Van Cleef later appeared in The Good, the Bad and the Ugly (1966), The Big Gundown (1967), Death Rides a Horse (1967), Day of Anger (1967), Beyond the Law (1968), Sabata (1969) and its sequel Return of Sabata (1971), Barquero (1970), El Condor (1970), Captain Apache (1971),The Magnificent Seven Ride! (1972), The Grand Duel (1972), Mean Frank and Crazy Tony (1973), The Stranger and the Gunfighter (1974), Take a Hard Ride (1975), The Hard Way (1980), The Octagon (1980), Escape from New York (1981), and Armed Response (1986). He played the lead role of John Peter McAllister on the martial-arts television series The Master (1984).

== Early life ==
Lee Van Cleef was born on January 9, 1925, in Somerville, New Jersey, to Marion Lavinia Van Fleet and Clarence LeRoy Van Cleef. His father was a pharmacist and his mother a concert pianist, both of Dutch descent. Lee graduated from Somerville High School and enlisted in the United States Navy in September 1942.

== Military service ==
After completing his military training, Van Cleef was assigned to the submarine chaser USS SC-681, and then to the minesweeper USS Incredible, on which he worked as a sonarman.

The ship initially patrolled the Caribbean, then moved to the Mediterranean, participating in the landings in southern France. In January 1945, Incredible moved to the Black Sea, and performed sweeping duties out of the Soviet Navy base at Sevastopol, Crimea. Afterwards, the ship performed air-sea rescue patrols in the Black Sea before returning to Palermo, Sicily.

By the time of his discharge in March 1946, he had achieved the rank of sonarman first class (SO1) and had earned his mine-sweeper patch. He also had been awarded the Bronze Star and the Good Conduct Medal. By virtue of his deployments, Van Cleef also qualified for the European-African-Middle Eastern Campaign Medal, Asiatic-Pacific Campaign Medal, the American Campaign Medal, and the World War II Victory Medal. He was discharged from the Navy in 1946.

Bronze Star
Good Conduct Medal
European–African–Middle Eastern Campaign Medal
Asiatic-Pacific Campaign Medal
American Campaign Medal
World War II Victory Medal

== Acting career ==
After leaving the Navy, Van Cleef returned home to Somerville where he played in an amateur dance band. Van Cleef received his first acting role as George in the play Our Town at the Little Theater Group in Clinton, New Jersey. His next role was a boxer named Joe Pendleton in the play Heaven Can Wait. A talent scout took him to New York City talent agent Maynard Morris of the MCA agency, who sent him to the Alvin Theater, where he won a role in Mister Roberts.

During a performance of Mister Roberts in Los Angeles, Van Cleef was noticed by film producer Stanley Kramer, who offered Van Cleef a role in his upcoming film High Noon. Kramer wanted Van Cleef for the role of the deputy Harvey Pell, but wanted him to have his nose fixed. Van Cleef declined the role, but made his screen debut as the silent gunslinger Jack Colby. He was cast in Kansas City Confidential (1952), Vice Squad (1953), The Big Combo (1955) and It Conquered the World (1956)

=== Supporting actor ===
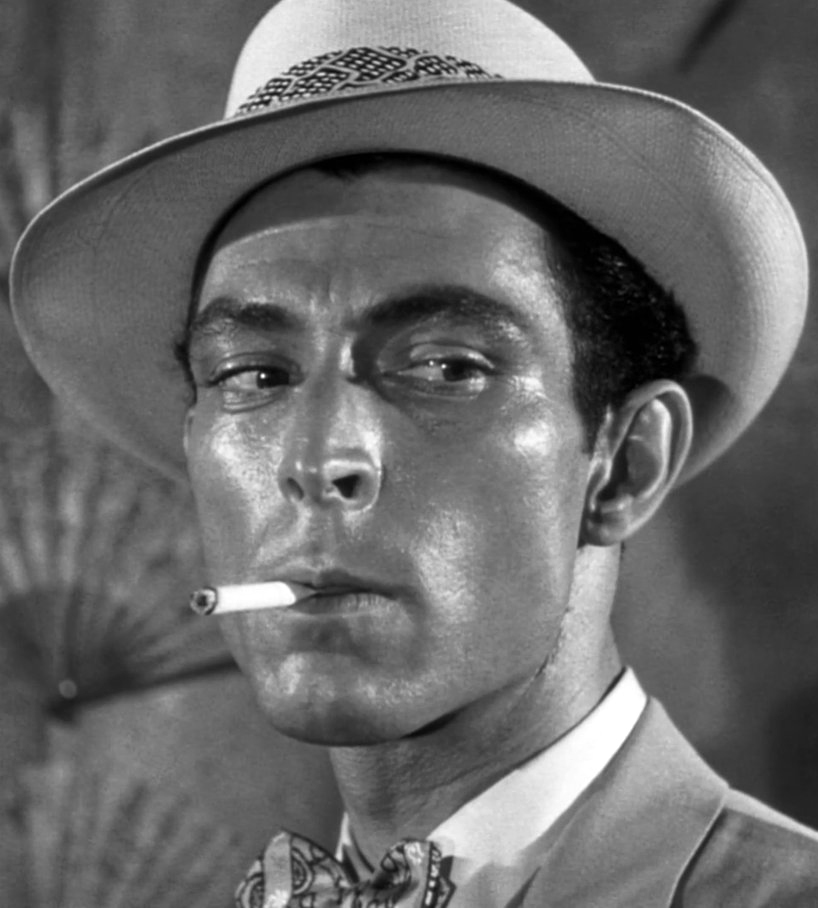
Van Cleef in Kansas City Confidential (1952)

In 1952, he made his television debut when he was cast in the episode "Formula for Fear" of the Western aviation series Sky King. Van Cleef appeared six times between 1953 and 1955 on the children's syndicated Western series The Adventures of Kit Carson. He was cast three times in syndicated Western series, The Range Rider. He appeared in episode 82 of the television series The Lone Ranger in 1952. In 1954, he appeared as Jesse James in the syndicated series Stories of the Century.

In 1955, he was cast twice on the syndicated Western series, Annie Oakley and guest-starred on the CBS Western series Brave Eagle. Van Cleef played a villain in an episode of The Adventures of Champion the Wonder Horse in 1955. He played Cherokee Bob in the NBC Western series Tales of Wells Fargo in 1957. In 1958, he was cast as Ed Murdock, a rodeo performer trying to reclaim the title in the event at Madison Square Garden in New York City, on Richard Diamond, Private Detective.

Van Cleef played different characters on four episodes of ABC's The Rifleman, with Chuck Connors, between 1959 and 1962 (as Stinger in S2 E31 "The Prodigal" 1960), and twice on ABC's Tombstone Territory. In 1958, he was cast as Deputy Sid Carver in the episode "The Great Stagecoach Robbery" of another syndicated Western series, Frontier Doctor, starring Rex Allen. In 1959, Van Cleef appeared as Luke Clagg in the episode "Strange Request" of the NBC Western series Riverboat, as Jumbo Kane in the episode "The Hostage" on the CBS Western series "Wanted Dead or Alive", and in an episode of Maverick titled "Red Dog" in 1961.

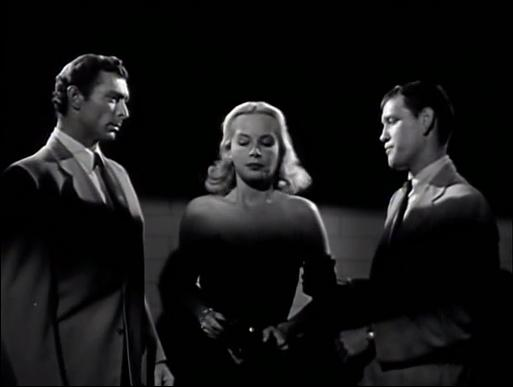
Van Cleef (l.), Jean Wallace and Earl Holliman in The Big Combo (1955)

Van Cleef played a sentry on an episode of the ABC sitcom The Real McCoys. Van Cleef was cast with Pippa Scott and again with Chuck Connors in the 1960 episode "Trial by Fear" of the CBS anthology series The DuPont Show with June Allyson. A young Van Cleef also made an appearance on The Andy Griffith Show and as Frank Diamond in The Untouchables, in an episode entitled "The Unhired Assassin". He also appeared in an episode of the ABC/Warner Brothers Western series The Alaskans.

Van Cleef guest-starred on the CBS Western series Have Gun – Will Travel, on the ABC/Warner Bros. series Colt .45, on the NBC Western series Cimarron City and Laramie, and on Rod Cameron's syndicated crime dramas City Detective and State Trooper. He guest-starred in an episode of John Bromfield's syndicated crime drama Sheriff of Cochise. Van Cleef starred as minor villains and henchmen in various Westerns, including The Tin Star and Gunfight at the O.K. Corral.

In 1960, he appeared as a villainous swindler in the Bonanza episode, "The Bloodline" (December 31, 1960), and also made an appearance on Gunsmoke. In 1961, he played a role on episode seven ("The Grave") of the third season of The Twilight Zone starring Lee Marvin. He played a villainous henchman of Lee Marvin's titular character in the 1962 John Ford movie The Man Who Shot Liberty Valance starring John Wayne and James Stewart. In 1963, he appeared on Perry Mason (episode: "The Case of the Golden Oranges"). That same year, he appeared in "The Day of the Misfits" on The Travels of Jaimie McPheeters.

=== Stardom ===
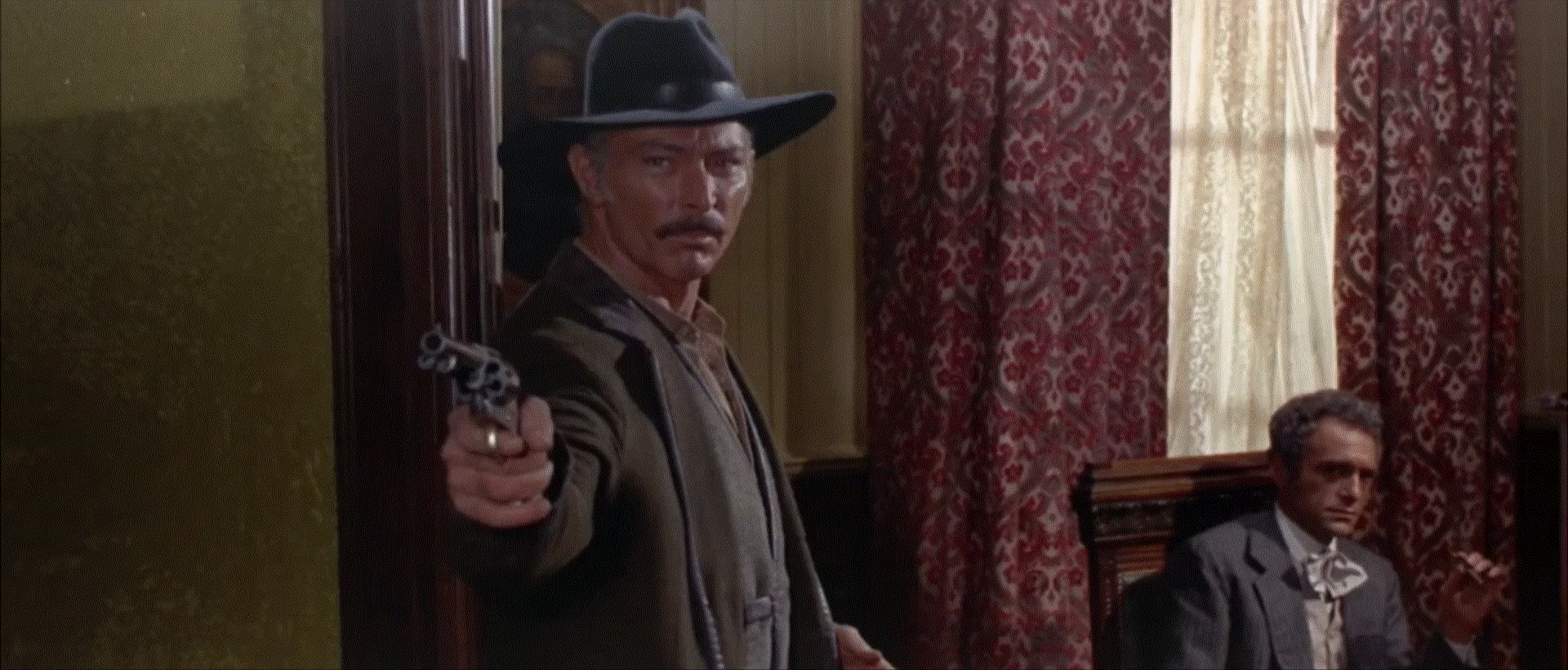
Van Cleef in Death Rides a Horse (1967)

In 1965, Leone cast Van Cleef, whose career had yet to take off, as a main protagonist alongside Clint Eastwood in For a Few Dollars More. Leone then chose Van Cleef to appear again with Eastwood, this time as the primary antagonist, Angel Eyes, in the now seminal Western The Good, the Bad and the Ugly (1966).

With his roles in Leone's films, Van Cleef became a major star of spaghetti Westerns, playing central, and often surprisingly heroic, roles in films such as The Big Gundown (1966), Death Rides a Horse (1967), Day of Anger (1967), and The Grand Duel (1972). He played the title role in Sabata (1969) and Return of Sabata (1971). Van Cleef starred in the Kung fu Spaghetti Western The Stranger and the Gunfighter (1974) and co-starred with Jim Brown in an Italian-American co-production, Take a Hard Ride (1975). In his two final Westerns, he co-starred with Leif Garrett in God's Gun (1976) and Kid Vengeance (1977), both of which were filmed mainly in Israel. During the 1970s, Van Cleef also had leading roles in American Westerns, such as Barquero (1970), El Condor (1970) and The Magnificent Seven Ride! (1972).

Apart from Westerns, Van Cleef acted in Action - Crime films as well. He portrayed Frankie Diomede in Mean Frank and Crazy Tony (1973), which was produced by Dino De Laurentiis and starred alongside Karen Black in The Rip-Off (1978). Van Cleef also portrayed Ike Scanlon, a U.S. Marshal assigned to protect a syndicate hitman in Nowhere to Hide (1977), a television pilot, for NBC. Van Cleef would later star alongside Patrick McGoohan in the John Boorman produced crime thriller The Hard Way (1980). Van Cleef starred alongside Chuck Norris in the martial-arts film The Octagon (1980). Van Cleef later had a supporting role in John Carpenter's cult film Escape from New York (1981). He slipped out of the limelight in his later years. In 1984, he was cast as a ninja master in the NBC adventure series The Master, but it was canceled after 13 episodes. Van Cleef also supported Lewis Collins in Code Name: Wild Geese (1984) and appeared alongside David Carradine in Armed Response (1986). In all, Van Cleef is credited with 90 film roles and 109 television appearances over a 38-year span.

== Personal life ==
Van Cleef married Patsy Ruth Kahle in 1943 and the couple had three children before divorcing in 1958. In 1960, he married Joan Marjorie Drane, and they divorced in 1974. He married Barbara Havelone in 1976, who survived him upon his death in 1989.

In late 1958, Van Cleef was in a serious car accident while driving home from early production of the film Ride Lonesome. Another driver crossed the center line and collided with Van Cleef's car head-on. He suffered a badly broken left arm and left kneecap. He was hospitalized several weeks and had a metal rod in his arm for months. Van Cleef walked with a limp for the rest of his life, and leg pain meant he rarely rode horses in films after the crash.

He lost the last joint of his right-hand middle finger while building a playhouse for his daughter.

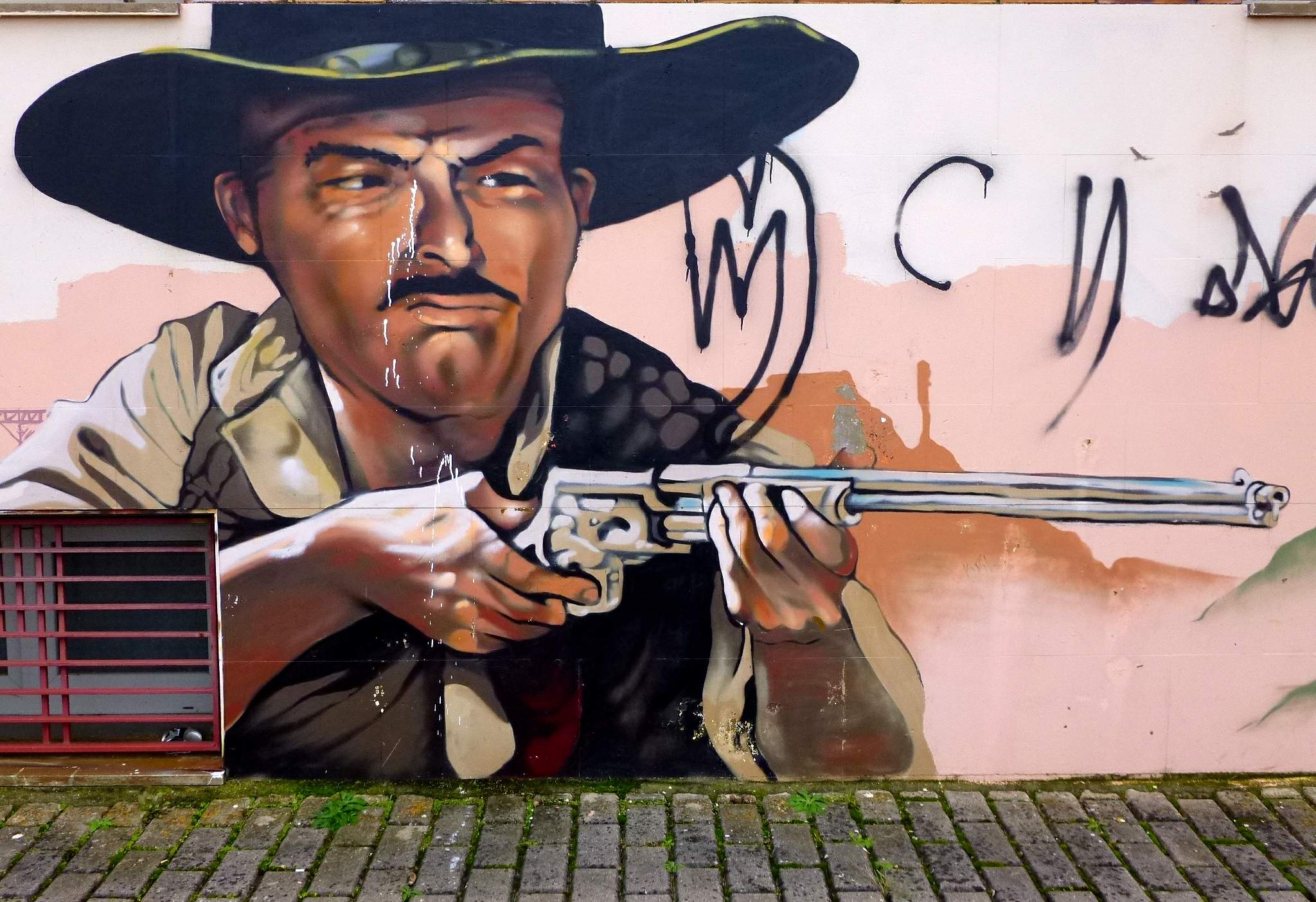
Mural in Navarre depicting Van Cleef as Jonathan Corbett in The Big Gundown (1967)

== Death ==
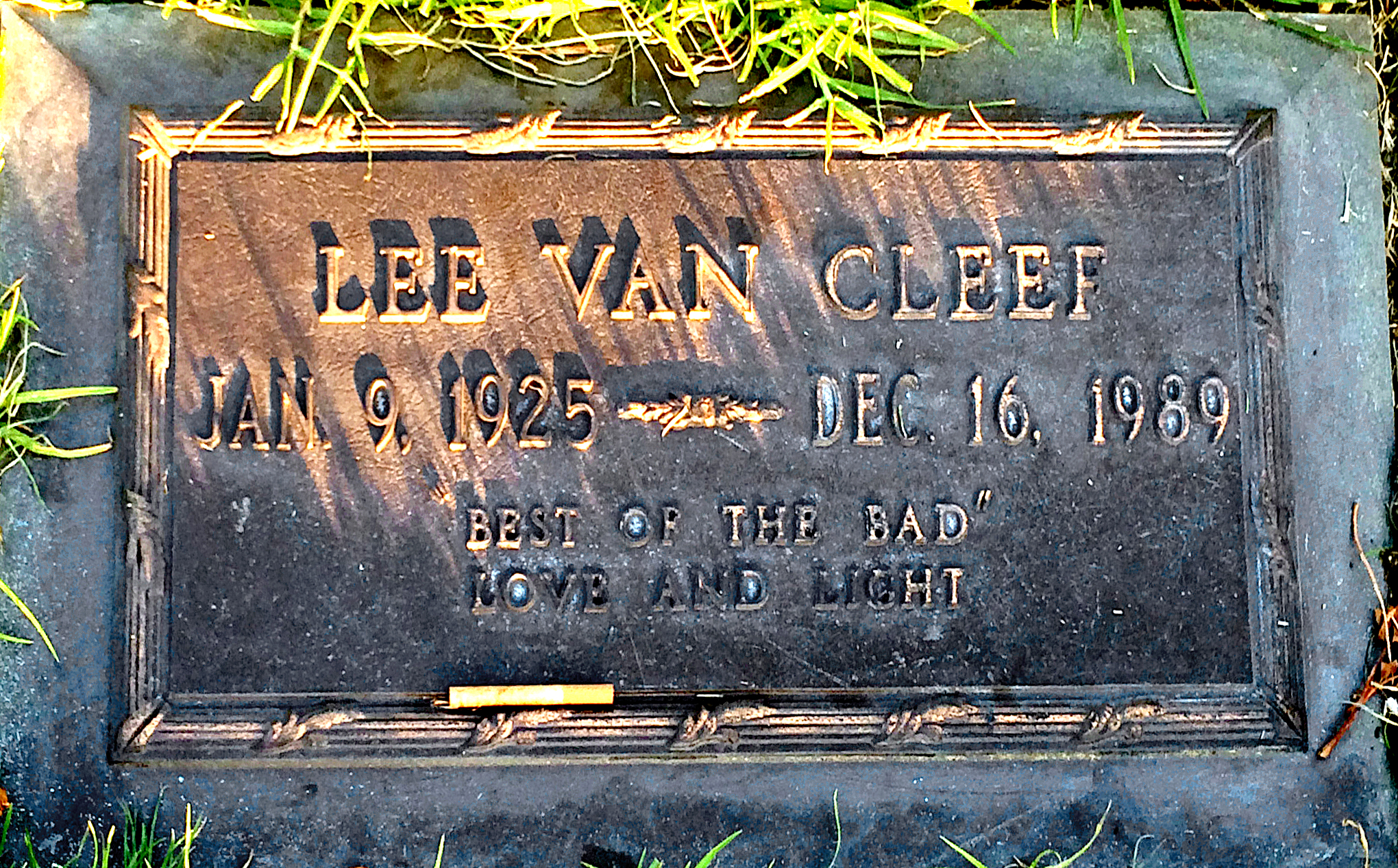
Van Cleef's grave at Forest Lawn Hollywood Hills

Despite suffering from heart disease from the 1970s and having a pacemaker installed in the 1980s, Van Cleef continued to work in films until his death on December 16, 1989. He collapsed from a heart attack in his home in Oxnard, California. Throat cancer was listed as a secondary cause of death.

He was buried at Forest Lawn Memorial Park Cemetery, Hollywood Hills, California, with an inscription on his grave marker reading "BEST OF THE BAD", referring to his many notable acting performances as a villain.

== Legacy ==
Lee Van Cleef's characters in the Sergio Leone movies inspired the creation of the characters Elliot Belt of the Lucky Luke comic album The Bounty Hunter, and Cad Bane of the Star Wars franchise.

The Black Library magazine Inferno! featured several short stories, within the Necromunda setting, starring a bounty hunter named Nathan Creed, who was written as a homage to Lee Van Cleef; writer Jonathan Green described the character as "Lee Van Cleef, Clint Eastwood, The Man With No Name and John Wayne all rolled into one", and illustrations in the magazine clearly showed Creed as physically nearly identical to Van Cleef.

== Filmography ==
=== Film ===
Year	Title	Role	Director	Notes
1952	High Noon	Jack Colby	Fred Zinnemann	
1952	Untamed Frontier	Dave Chittun	Hugo Fregonese	
1952	Kansas City Confidential	Tony Romano	Phil Karlson	
1953	The Lawless Breed	Dirk Hanley	Raoul Walsh	
1953	The Bandits of Corsica	Nerva	Ray Nazarro	
1953	White Lightning	Brutus Allen	Edward Bernds	
1953	The Beast from 20,000 Fathoms	Corporal Stone	Eugène Lourié	
1953	Arena	"Smitty" Smith	Richard Fleischer	
1953	Vice Squad	Pete Monte	Arnold Laven	
1953	Jack Slade	"Bolt" Mackay	Harold D. Schuster	
1953	Tumbleweed	Marvin "Marv"	Nathan Juran	
1953	The Nebraskan	Private Reno Benton	Fred F. Sears	
1954	Gypsy Colt	Hank	Andrew Marton	
1954	Rails into Laramie	"Ace" Winton	Jesse Hibbs	
1954	Arrow in the Dust	Tilotson Henchman	Lesley Selander	
1954	The Yellow Tomahawk	Fire Knife	Lesley Selander	
1954	Princess of the Nile	Hakar	Harmon Jones	Uncredited
1954	The Desperado	Paul Crayton / 'Buck' Crayton	Thomas Carr	
1954	Dawn at Socorro	Earl Ferris	George Sherman	
1955	Treasure of Ruby Hills	Frank Emmett	Frank McDonald	
1955	Ten Wanted Men	Al Drucker	H. Bruce Humberstone	
1955	The Big Combo	Fante	Joseph H. Lewis	
1955	I Cover the Underworld	"Flash" Logan	R. G. Springsteen	
1955	The Road to Denver	Larry "Pecos Larry"	Joseph Kane	
1955	The Naked Street	Harry Goldish	Maxwell Shane	Uncredited
1955	A Man Alone	Clanton	Ray Milland	
1955	The Vanishing American	Jay Lord	Joseph Kane	
1956	The Conqueror	Chepei	Dick Powell	
1956	Tribute to a Bad Man	"Fat" Jones	Robert Wise	
1956	It Conquered the World	Dr. Tom Anderson	Roger Corman	
1956	Pardners	Gus	Norman Taurog	
1956	Accused of Murder	Sergeant Emmett Lackey	Joseph Kane	
1957	The Quiet Gun	Doug Sadler	William F. Claxton	
1957	The Badge of Marshal Brennan	"Shad" Donaphin	Albert C. Gannaway	
1957	China Gate	Major Cham	Samuel Fuller	
1957	Gunfight at the O.K. Corral	Ed Bailey	John Sturges	
1957	The Lonely Man	Faro	Henry Levin	
1957	The Last Stagecoach West	Steve Margolies	Joseph Kane	
1957	Joe Dakota	Adam Grant	Richard Bartlett	
1957	The Tin Star	Ed McGaffey	Anthony Mann	
1957	Gun Battle at Monterey	Kirby	Sidney Franklin Jr. Carl K. Hittleman	
1957	Raiders of Old California	Sergeant Damon Pardee	Albert C. Gannaway	
1958	Day of the Bad Man	Jake Hayes	Harry Keller	
1958	The Young Lions	1st Sergeant Rickett	Edward Dmytryk	
1958	The Bravados	Alfonso Parral	Henry King	
1958	Guns, Girls, and Gangsters	Mike Benett	Edward L. Cahn	
1958	Machete	Miguel	Kurt Neumann	
1959	Ride Lonesome	Frank	Budd Boetticher	
1961	Posse from Hell	Leo	Herbert Coleman	
1962	The Man Who Shot Liberty Valance	Reese	John Ford	
1962	How the West Was Won	River Pirate	John Ford; Henry Hathaway; George Marshall	Uncredited
1965	For a Few Dollars More	Colonel Douglas Mortimer	Sergio Leone	
1966	The Good, the Bad and the Ugly	"Angel Eyes" / "The Bad"	Sergio Leone	
1967	The Big Gundown	Jonathan "Colorado" Corbett	Sergio Sollima	
1967	Death Rides a Horse	Ryan	Giulio Petroni	
1967	Day of Anger	Frank Talby	Tonino Valerii	
1968	Beyond the Law	Billy Joe Cudlip	Giorgio Stegani	
1968	Commandos	Master Sergeant Sullivan	Armando Crispino	
1969	Sabata	Sabata	Gianfranco Parolini	
1970	Barquero	Travis	Gordon Douglas	
1970	El Condor	Jaroo	John Guillermin	
1971	Captain Apache	Captain Apache	Alexander Singer	Also performer on Captain Apache and Morning April
1971	Return of Sabata	Sabata	Gianfranco Parolini	
1971	Bad Man's River	Roy King	Eugenio Martín	
1972	The Magnificent Seven Ride!	Chris Adams	George McCowan	
1972	The Grand Duel	Sheriff Clayton	Giancarlo Santi	
1973	Mean Frank and Crazy Tony	Frankie Diomede	Michele Lupo	
1974	The Stranger and the Gunfighter	Dakota	Antonio Margheriti	Also performer on Rye Whiskey
1975	Take a Hard Ride	Kiefer	Antonio Margheriti	
1976	God's Gun	Father John / Lewis	Gianfranco Parolini	
1977	Kid Vengeance	McClain	Joe Manduke	
1977	The Perfect Killer	Harry Chapman	Mario Siciliano	
1978	The Rip-Off	Chris Gretchko / Ray Sloan	Antonio Margheriti	Also known as The Squeeze
1980	The Octagon	McCarn	Eric Karson	
1981	Escape from New York	Police Commissioner Bob Hauk	John Carpenter	
1984	Goma-2	Julot	José Antonio de la Loma	
1984	Code Name: Wild Geese	"China"	Antonio Margheriti	
1985	Jungle Raiders	Warren	Antonio Margheriti	
1986	Armed Response	Burt Roth	Fred Olen Ray	
1988	The Commander	Colonel Mazzarini	Antonio Margheriti	
1989	Speed Zone	Rock-Skipping Grandfather	Jim Drake	
1990	Thieves of Fortune	Sergio Danielo Christophero	Michael MacCarthy	Posthumous release and final film role. Originally filmed in 1988.

=== Television ===
Year	Title	Role(s)	Episode(s)	Network(s)
1952	Sky King	Mark	"Formula for Fear"	NBC, ABC
1952	Boston Blackie	Lou / Captain Jansen	"Inside Crime"; "Deep Six"	
1952–1953	The Range Rider	'El Latigo' / Joe 'Utah Joe' / Rocky Hatch	"Treasure of Santa Dolores"; "Outlaw's Double"; "Greed Rides the Range"	
1952–1953	The Lone Ranger	Joe Singer / 'Bull' Harper / Henchman Jango	"Desperado at Large"; "The Brown Pony"; "Stage to Estacado"	
1954–1962	Death Valley Days	Unknown / Brogger	"Snowshoe Thompson"; "The Hat That Won the West"	
1954	The Adventures of Rin Tin Tin	Ed McCleod	"Rin Tin Tin and The Ranging River"	
1955	The Man Behind the Badge	Floyd	"The Case of the Desperate Moment"	CBS
1955	Champion the Wonder Horse	Frank	"Crossroad Trail"	CBS
1957	Tales of Wells Fargo	Cherokee Bob	Alder Gulch	NBC
1957	Trackdown	Ben	"The Town"	
1958	Wagon Train	'Rufe' Beal	"The Jesse Cowan Story"	
1958	Zorro	Antonio Castillo	"Welcome to Monterey"	
1958	Richard Diamond, Private Detective	Ed Murdock	"Rodeo"	
1959	Mr. Lucky	Unknown	"Dangerous Lady"	
1959	Yancy Derringer	Ike Milton / Frank James	"Outlaw at Liberty"	
1959	Wanted: Dead or Alive	'Jumbo' Kane	"The Hostage"	
1959	The Real McCoys	1st Sentry	"Grandpa Fights the Air Force"	
1959–1962	The Rifleman	Dan Maury / 'Stinger' / Wicks / Johnny Drako	"The Deadly Wait"; "The Prodigal"; "The Clarence Bibs Story"; "Death Never Rides Alone"	ABC
1960	The Slowest Gun in the West	Sam Bass	Television film	
1960	77 Sunset Strip	Deek	"Attic"	Warner Bros.
1960	Bonanza	Appling	"The Blood Line"	NBC
1960–63	Laramie	Wes Torrey / Dawson / 'Mac' Morgan / Caleb	".45 Calibre"; "Killer Odds"; "Vengeance"; "The Stranger"	
1960–66	Gunsmoke	Rad Meadows / Johnny Hooker / Ike Jeffords	"Old Flame"/"The Pariah"/"My Father, My Son"	
1961	Maverick	'Wolf' McManus	"Red Dog"	
1961–62	Cheyenne	Braden / Larry Jackson / Harry	"Trouble Street"; "A Man Called Ragen"; "Man Alone"	
1961	The Twilight Zone	Steinhart	"The Grave"	CBS
1961	Stagecoach West	Lin Hyatt	"Never Walk Alone"	
1963	The Joey Bishop Show	Charlie	"Double Exposure"	
1963	The Dakotas	Slade Tucker	"Thunder in Pleasant Valley"	ABC
1963	Perry Mason	Edward Doyle	"The Case of the Golden Oranges"	
1962–63	Have Gun – Will Travel	Corbin / Golias	"The Treasure"; "Face of a Shadow"	
1962–63	Ripcord	Henry Kane / Jack Martin	"Thoroughbred"; "The Money Mine"	
1964	Rawhide	Fred Grant / Deck Sommers	"The Enormous Fist"; "Piney"	CBS
1965	The Andy Griffith Show	Purse Thief	"Banjo-Playing Deputy"	CBS
1965	My Mother the Car	Nick Fitch	"Burned at the Steak"	
1965–66	Branded	Unknown	"The Richest Man in Boot Hill", "Call to Glory"	NBC
1966	Laredo	Mike 'Big Mike' Kelly	"Quarter Past Eleven"	
1977	No Where to Hide	Ike Scanlon	Television film	NBC
1980	The Hard Way	McNeal	Television film	ITV
1984	The Master	John Peter McAllister / The Master	All episodes; starring role	NBC
