= USS Incredible =

Minesweeper of the United States Navy

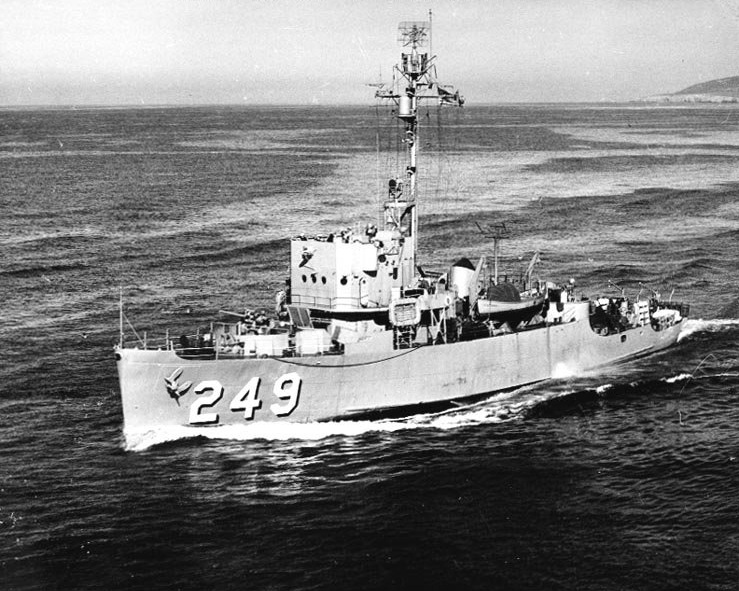
- Incredible underway off San Diego, California, circa 1951–53.

History

United States
- Name: USS Incredible
- Builder: Savannah Machine and Foundry Company
- Laid down: 9 September 1943
- Launched: 21 November 1943
- Commissioned: 17 April 1944
- Decommissioned: 6 November 1946
- Recommissioned: 14 August 1950
- Decommissioned: 21 September 1954
- Stricken: 1 December 1959
- Fate: Sold for scrap 1 December 1960

General characteristics
- Class & type: Admirable-class minesweeper
- Displacement: 650 tons
- Length: 184 ft 6 in (56.24 m)
- Beam: 33 ft (10 m)
- Draft: 9 ft 9 in (2.97 m)
- Propulsion: 2 × ALCO 539 diesel engines, 1,710 shp (1.3 MW); Farrel-Birmingham single reduction gear; 2 shafts
- Speed: 14.8 knots (27.4 km/h)
- Complement: 104
- Armament: 1 × 3"/50 caliber gun DP; 2 × twin Bofors 40 mm guns; 1 × Hedgehog anti-submarine mortar; 2 × Depth charge tracks

Service record
- Part of: US Atlantic Fleet (1944–45); US Pacific Fleet (1945–46), (1950–54); Pacific Reserve Fleet (1946–50), (1954–59)
- Operations: Operation Dragoon, Korean War
- Awards: 2 Battle stars (World War II); 4 Battle stars (Korean War)

USS Incredible (AM-249) was an Admirable-class minesweeper built for the U.S. Navy during World War II. She was built to clear minefields in offshore waters, and served the Navy in the North Atlantic Ocean and then in the Pacific Ocean. She returned home, finishing the war with two battle stars to her credit. When she was recalled for duty in the Korean War, she returned home again with four more battle stars.

== History ==
Incredible was launched 21 November 1943 by Savannah Machine & Foundry Co., Savannah, Georgia; sponsored by Mrs. Herbert Hezlep; and commissioned 17 April 1944.

=== World War II ===
After shakedown along the U.S. East Coast and in the Caribbean, Incredible departed Norfolk, Virginia, 24 July, escorting a convoy to North Africa for the invasion of southern France, the Allies landing 15 August. She carried out her sweeping duties very effectively, sometimes without destroyer cover. On 10 September Incredible and her group repelled an attack of 12 human torpedoes, 2 of which she destroyed. She continued her minesweeping duties off southern France until 18 January 1945 when she sailed for a special mission to Russia and the Black Sea. Incredible performed sweeping duties out of Sevastopol, Russia, then served as an air-sea rescue patrol ship in the Black Sea until resuming to Palermo, Sicily, 20 February.

Incredible returned to Norfolk 5 May; and, after overhaul, departed 23 July for duty in the Pacific. She arrived Pearl Harbor eight days after the fighting stopped via the Panama Canal Zone and San Diego, California. The minesweeper sailed from Pearl Harbor 31 August for Operation Skagway, clearing the minefields in the East China Sea–Ryukyus area. This important duty lasted until 17 February 1946 when she returned to San Pedro, Los Angeles. She remained there until she decommissioned at Puget Sound 6 November, joining the Reserve Fleet. From 28 November 1947 to 28 September 1949 Incredible was "In Service, out of commission", based at Yokosuka, Japan.

Among her crew was Lee Van Cleef, with the rank of Sonarman First Class who saved a shipsdog Rusty and who after the war became an actor known for his roles in Spaghetti Westerns. Van Cleef served on Incredible from 1944 to 1946 and won a Bronze Star when the ship was attacked after Operation Dragoon on 10 September 1944.

=== Korean War operations ===
Incredible was recommissioned 14 August 1950 at Yokosuka and departed 18 September for minesweeping and patrol duties in the Pusan area. While on patrol in mine-infested waters, on 12 October she rescued 27 survivors from USS Pirate (AM-275) which had struck a mine. Delivering her passengers to safety, she continued her operations in the battle zone, sweeping harbors and serving on patrol and escort duty. Returning to Yokosuka, Japan, Incredible sailed for Long Beach, California, arriving 4 August 1951.

The minesweeper operated along the U.S. West Coast and out of Pearl Harbor until 6 August 1953 when she sailed for the Far East. For the remainder of the year she operated out of Japan and on patrol along the coast of Korea

Incredible returned to Long Beach 11 March 1954 and was decommissioned there 21 September, again joining the Reserve Fleet. Reclassified MSF-249, 7 February 1955, Incredible remained in the Long Beach Group, Pacific Reserve Fleet until she was struck from the Navy List 1 December 1959. She was sold 8 August 1960 to National Metal and Steel Corp., Terminal Island, California.

== Awards and honors ==
Incredible received two battle stars for World War II service and four for Korean service.
