= The Red Frenzy =

1962 film

- Directed by: Wolfgang Schleif
- Written by: Hellmut Andics
- Based on: The Red Frenzy by Hans Ulrich Horster
- Produced by: Ernst Müller
- Starring: Klaus Kinski; Brigitte Grothum; Marina Petrova.
- Cinematography: Walter Partsch
- Edited by: Paula Dvorak
- Music by: Hans-Martin Majewski
- Production company: Rex-Film
- Distributed by: Nora-Filmverleih
- Release date: 24 May 1962
- Running time: 88 minutes
- Country: West Germany
- Language: German

The Red Frenzy or The Red Rage (German: Der rote Rausch) is a 1962 West German thriller film directed by Wolfgang Schleif and starring Klaus Kinski, Brigitte Grothum and Marina Petrova. It was shot at the Kalvarienberg Studios in Vienna. The film's sets were designed by the art director Theodor Harisch. It was based on a novel by Hans Ulrich Horster.

== Synopsis ==
Josef Stier, convicted for murder four woman whose red necklaces triggered him, escapes from a psychiatric hospital and roams through the countryside. Having lost his memory he is discovered in some marshes by Katrin whose family own a farm. She takes him in and comes to believe that he is her missing husband Martin. He begins to care for Katrin and lives a normal life for a while under the name Martin. However, one day while in the town he sees a wanted poster of himself, causing a breakdown. He is hunted and pursued by the police at the farm, along with a group of angry villagers.

== Cast ==
- Klaus Kinski as Martin/Josef Stier
- Brigitte Grothum as Katrin
- Marina Petrova as Anna
- Sieghardt Rupp as Karl
- Dieter Borsche as Professor Lindner
- Jochen Brockmann as Vollbricht
- Hans Obonya as Klobner
- Elisabeth Terval as Theres
- Annemarie Berthe as Professor Lindners Assistantin
- Edd Stavjanik as Kriminalrat Berger
- Peter Machac as Franz
- Christine Ratej as Hanni
- Helmuth Silbergasser as Stephan
- Renate Schmidt as Verkäuferin
- Josef Krastel as Ladenbesitzer
- Herbert Fux as Lastwagenfahrer
- Walter Regelsberger as Verkehrspolizist

== Bibliography ==
- Goble, Alan. The Complete Index to Literary Sources in Film. Walter de Gruyter, 1999.
