= Anno uno =

1974 film

- Directed by: Roberto Rossellini
- Starring: Luigi Vannucchi
- Cinematography: Mario Montuori
- Music by: Mario Nascimbene
- Release date: 1974
- Language: Italian

Anno uno (internationally released as Year One and Italy: Year One) is a 1974 Italian biographical film directed by Roberto Rossellini. The film tells the story of the political reconstruction of post-fascist Italy between 1944 and 1954, seen through the career of Alcide De Gasperi (1881–1954).

== Cast ==
- Luigi Vannucchi as Alcide De Gasperi
- Dominique Darel as Maria Romana De Gasperi
- Corrado Olmi as Giuseppe Di Vittorio
- Renato Montanari as Pietro Secchia
- Tino Bianchi as Palmiro Togliatti
- Ennio Balbo as Pietro Nenni
- Rita Forzano as Lucia De Gasperi
- Valeria Sabel as Francesca De Gasperi
- Paolo Bonacelli as Giovanni Amendola
- Francesco Di Federico as Giuseppe Saragat
- Omero Antonutti
- Renato Scarpa
