= Mean Frank and Crazy Tony =

1973 film by Michele Lupo

- Directed by: Michele Lupo
- Screenplay by: Luciano Vincenzoni; Sergio Donati; Nicola Badalucco
- Story by: Luciano Vincenzoni; Sergio Donati; Nicola Badalucco
- Produced by: Dino De Laurentiis
- Starring: Lee Van Cleef; Tony Lo Bianco; Edwige Fenech; Jean Rochefort
- Cinematography: Aldo Tonti; Joe D'Amato
- Edited by: Antonietta Zita
- Music by: Riz Ortolani
- Production companies: Giada International Company / Produzioni Cinematografiche Inter.Ma.Co.; Les Films Marceau; Filmsonor
- Distributed by: Columbia C.E.I.A.D.
- Release dates: 23 November 1973 (Italy); 7 May 1975 (Paris)
- Running time: 100 minutes
- Countries: Italy; France
- Box office: ₤353.735 million

Mean Frank and Crazy Tony (Italian: Il suo nome faceva tremare...Interpol in allarme or Italian: Dio, sei proprio un padreterno! ) is a 1973 crime-comedy film directed by Michele Lupo, and starring Lee Van Cleef, Tony Lo Bianco and Edwige Fenech.

== Plot ==
Tony Breda, whilst well-respected in his Italian town, is a small-time criminal who idolises and attempts to imitate his hero Italo-American mobster Frankie Diomede who has earned the nickname "Dio" ("God"). Tony reads in the newspaper that Frank has returned to Genoa to take care of a rival organisation, run by Louis Annunziata, operating in his home territory. Starstruck, Tony follows Frank from his hotel to a villa where a party is taking place and tries to gain entry. Frank calmly calls the police and alerts them to illegal gambling activities taking place at the party, and in doing so arranges his own arrest. When Tony hears advancing police sirens, he pushes past the fleeing guests to reach Frank, believing that if he rescues him from arrest, he will be "made for life". Frank refuses to leave with Tony and both are arrested.

While in prison, with the help of a guard that has presumably been paid by Frank, Frank leaves the premises by cover of night to murder a rival. On returning he is seen by Tony. Annunziata alerts the police to the murder, and they seek to hold Frank indefinitely whilst they investigate. Meanwhile, Tony is advised that he will spend a couple of weeks in prison on minor charges. Tony tries to befriend Frank with flattery and imitation, which Frank largely ignores. However, Tony spots an assassin with a sniper rifle on the roof of the prison and pushes Frank out of the way, saving his life. Frank softens toward Tony, who declares that he would do anything for Frank.

Frank asks his estranged brother who is a respectable doctor to visit him, and asks him to collect files containing identifying information on his rival's organisation and hand them in to the police. His brother agrees, but is followed, pulled into a photo booth and murdered. A gang member uses the booth to take a photo of Frank's dead brother. Tony convinces Frank that he can arrange a break-out during Frank's transfer to another prison, which he successfully achieves by staging a car crash and waving down the police car transferring Frank. The two then embark on a deadly police car chase in a truck carrying oil drums and cross the border into Marseilles. Frank tracks down his rival at a fish processing warehouse, where Annunziata's runs an operation concealing heroin inside gutted fish to be exported to the United States. A violent shoot out takes place in which Tony proves himself to be useful, though he becomes paralysed with distress when he shoots a man, having never taken a life before, a man who he believes he has killed. Frank reassures Tony that he did not kill the man and that Frank actually delivered the fatal bullet.

Frank forces Annunziata at gun point into a cold storage room, where he adjusts the temperature to its lowest setting, causing Annunziata to freeze to death. Frank arranges a boat to Tunisia, via an old friend, but informs Tony that a life of hard crime is not for him, and urges him to reform his ways. Tony accepts that he is not cut out for such violence and returns home. When he greets his friends they read an excerpt from the newspaper which describes Frank in an unfavorable way, and Tony advises his friend to lead an honest life.

== Cast ==
- Lee Van Cleef: Frankie Diomede
- Tony Lo Bianco: Tony Breda
- Edwige Fenech: Orchidea
- Jean Rochefort: Louis Annunziata
- Fausto Tozzi: Massara
- Silvano Tranquilli: Silvestro
- Adolfo Lastretti: Al
- Claudio Gora: Director of 'Casa del Giovane'
- Jess Hahn: Jeannot
- Mario Erpichini: Joe Sciti
- Nello Pazzafini: Thug in Prison
- Robert Hundar: Assassin
- Renzo Marignano: Receiver

== Release ==
Mean Frank and Crazy Tony was released in Italy on 23 November 1973 where it was distributed by Ceiad. It grossed a total 353,735,000 Italian lire domestically. It was released in Paris on 7 March 1975 as L'homme aux nerfs d'acier.

== Notes ==
=== References ===
- Curti, Roberto (2013). Italian Crime Filmography, 1968-1980. McFarland. ISBN 978-0786469765.
