= Sasha Jenson =

American film and television actor

- Born: Alexander Jenson; November 12, 1964 (age 60); Los Angeles, California, U.S.
- Occupation: Actor
- Years active: 1986–present
- Parents: Roy Jenson (father); Marina Petrova (mother)

Alexander "Sasha" Jenson is an American film and television actor known for his role in the 1993 hit film Dazed and Confused.

== Career ==
Jenson is also known for his roles in Halloween 4: The Return of Michael Myers, Dazed and Confused, Ghoulies II, and Buffy the Vampire Slayer. Jenson starred in the television series Teen Angel as Jason and made guest appearances in episodes of NYPD Blue and Monsters.

== Personal life ==
Jenson is the son of Canadian-born actor and stuntman Roy Jenson and Serbian actress Marina Petrova. He attended North Hollywood High School, where he was a classmate of Adam Carolla.

== Filmography ==
=== Film ===
Year	Title	Role	Notes
1986	Free Ride	Boy #1	
1987	Ghoulies II	Teddy	
1988	Deadly Stranger	Jeff	
1988	Halloween 4: The Return of Michael Myers	Brady	
1989	Deadly Weapon	Martin	
1990	Dream Trap	Alvin Tingsley	
1990	A Girl to Kill For	Chuck	
1992	Buffy the Vampire Slayer	Grueller	
1992	The Unnamable II: The Statement of Randolph Carter	Irate Student	
1992	Distant Justice	Desert Scum	
1993	Dazed and Confused	Don Dawson	
1995	The Nature of the Beast	Gerald	
1995	Twisted Love	Bo Callahan	
1996	Dead Girl	Short Cop	
2003	A Little Crazy	Darryl	
2003	Grind	Greg	
2010	The Grind	Rick	
2013	Trust Me	Pat	
2016	Richard Linklater: Dream Is Destiny	—	Documentary
2021	Kid 90	—	Documentary

=== Television ===
Year	Title	Role	Notes
1988	Moving Target	Scott	Television film
1989	ABC Afterschool Special	Rick	Episode: "Just Tipsy, Honey"
1989	Monsters	Matthew	Episode: "The Match Game"
1995	Bikini College	Alvin Tingsley	Television film
1996	NYPD Blue	Johnny Arcotti	Episode: "Burnin' Love"

=== Video games ===
Year	Title	Role
1995	Mr. Payback: An Interactive Movie	Larry
1995	Dillinger and Capone	Billy
