= Eduard Rhein =

German inventor, publisher and writer

Eduard Rudolph Rhein (23 August 1900, Königswinter – 15 April 1993, Cannes) was an inventor, publisher, and writer. He was the founder of the German magazine Hörzu, which he directed as its editor-in-chief until 1964. He also founded the largest European foundation for information technology, the Eduard Rhein Foundation (1976).

He published under the pseudonyms Hans-Ulrich Horster, Klaus Hellmer, Klaus Hellborn, Adrian Hülsen and Claude Borell. In 1940 he published a book titled Du und die Elektrizität.

In 1990 he received the freedom of the city Königswinter.

== Filmography ==
- A Heart Plays False, directed by Rudolf Jugert (1953, based on the novel Ein Herz spielt falsch - written as Hans Ulrich Horster)
- The Angel with the Flaming Sword, directed by Gerhard Lamprecht (1954, based on the novel Der Engel mit dem Flammenschwert - written as Klaus Hellmer)
- Island of the Dead, directed by Victor Tourjansky (1955, based on the novel Die Toteninsel - written as Hans Ulrich Horster)
- Lost Child 312, directed by Gustav Machatý (1955, based on the novel Suchkind 312 - written as Hans Ulrich Horster)
- The Night of the Storm, directed by Falk Harnack (1957, based on the novel Wie ein Sturmwind - written as Klaus Hellmer)
- Heart Without Mercy, directed by Victor Tourjansky (1958, based on the novel Herz ohne Gnade - written as Klaus Hellmer)
- Ein Student ging vorbei, directed by Werner Klingler (1960, based on the novel Ein Student ging vorbei - written as Hans Ulrich Horster)
- Aurora Marriage Bureau, directed by Wolfgang Schleif (1962, based on the novel Eheinstitut Aurora - written as Hans Ulrich Horster)
- The Red Frenzy, directed by Wolfgang Schleif (1962, based on the novel Der rote Rausch - written as Hans Ulrich Horster)
- Lost Child 312, directed by Gabi Kubach (2007, TV film, based on the novel Suchkind 312 - written as Hans Ulrich Horster)
