= Barquero =

1970 film by Gordon Douglas

- Film poster
- Directed by: Gordon Douglas
- Written by: George Schenck; William Marks
- Produced by: Hal Klein
- Starring: Lee Van Cleef; Warren Oates; Forrest Tucker
- Cinematography: Jerry Finnerman
- Edited by: Charles Nelson
- Music by: Dominic Frontiere
- Distributed by: United Artists
- Release date: September 3, 1970
- Running time: 115 minutes
- Country: United States
- Language: English
- Box office: $135,381

Barquero is a 1970 American Western film starring Lee Van Cleef and Warren Oates, produced by Hal Klein and directed by Gordon Douglas. Barquero was Lee Van Cleef's first American-made film since 1962's How the West Was Won. It was also his first starring role in an American Western. The film grossed $135,381 at the US/Canadian box-office.

== Plot ==
After stealing a shipment of silver and weapons, the brutal and unstable Remy and his band of mercenaries must cross a river in order to flee into Mexico. Travis, the maverick owner-operator of a barge that ferries people and goods across the river, learns that Remy and his band are on the way. Travis and his woman, Nola, transport the nearby settlement's inhabitants and a group of passing settlers to the river's far side. When Remy and his band arrive, Travis refuses to cross back to pick them up, knowing that Remy and his men will kill everyone else after they cross the river. A tense standoff develops between Remy and his gang, and Travis and the inhabitants and settlers, who occupy opposite sides of the river. Remy is advised by Marquette, a Frenchman he trusts. Travis is greatly assisted by Mountain Phil, a friend of his who is similarly independent-minded in the way he lives. Both Remy and Travis have to contend with dissenters within their own camps. It all explodes into a violent and bloody battle, leading to a final confrontation between the two.

== Cast ==
- Lee Van Cleef as Travis
- Warren Oates as Remy
- Forrest Tucker as Mountain Phil
- Kerwin Mathews as Marquette
- Mariette Hartley as Anna
- Marie Gomez as Nola
- Armando Silvestre as Sawyer
- John Davis Chandler as Fair
- Harry Lauter as Steele

== Critical reception ==
The New York Times wrote in its review when comparing Barquero to star Lee Van Cleef's Spaghetti Westerns, ""Barquero," has carefully held to the format of those popular horse operas from abroad: stark color, clanging music, perpetual gunfire, stacks of corpses and a plot heavily punctuated with murderous glares, growls and squints."

== See also ==
- List of American films of 1970
