= Dominique Darel =

French model and actress

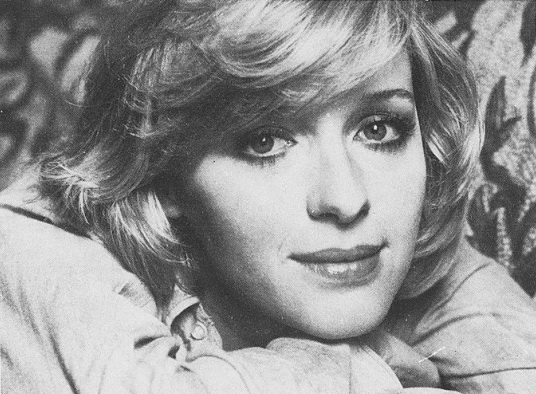
- Dominique Darel, 1973
- Born: 1950; Cannes, France
- Died: June 4, 1978 (aged 27–28); Cannes, France
- Occupations: French model and actress
- Years active: Late 1960s–1978
- Known for: Maria Romana De Gasperi in Roberto Rossellini's Year One

Dominique Darel (1950–June 4, 1978) was a French model and actress, mainly active in Italian cinema.

== Biography ==
Dominique Darel was born in Cannes and moved to Rome with her boyfriend Max Delys in 1968.

Darel made her film debut in Luchino Visconti's Death in Venice, then became a minor starlet in Italian genre cinema. She appeared in Andy Warhol's Dracula (1974), and for a pictorial that was published in the August 1974 issue of Playboy magazine, Warhol photographed Darel and Delys nude with his Polaroid camera in 1973. She is probably best known for the role of Maria Romana De Gasperi in Roberto Rossellini's Year One.

Darel died at 28, on June 4, 1978, in a car accident in Cannes.

== Filmography ==
- 1971: Death in Venice
- 1972: La cosa buffa
- 1972: The Grand Duel
- 1973: Woman Buried Alive
- 1974: Blood for Dracula
- 1974: Year One
- 1977: Difficile morire
