= The Hard Way (1980 film) =

1980 British TV film by Michael Dryhurst

- Cover of the 2009 DVD release (Network)
- Screenplay by: Kevin Grogan; Richard Ryan (as Richard F. Tombleson)
- Directed by: Michael Dryhurst
- Starring: Patrick McGoohan; Lee Van Cleef; Edna O'Brien
- Music by: Brian Eno; Tommy Potts
- Country of origin: United Kingdom
- Original language: English

Production
- Producer: John Boorman
- Cinematography: Henri Decaë
- Editor: Peter Tanner
- Running time: 89 minutes
- Production companies: Black Lion Films (as Jack Gill Presents); Incorporated Television Company (ITC)

Original release
- Network: ITV
- Release: 19 February 1980

The Hard Way is a 1980 British television action film directed by Michael Dryhurst and starring Patrick McGoohan, Lee Van Cleef and Edna O'Brien. The screenplay was by Kevin Grogan and Richard Ryan (as Richard F. Tombleson).

A professional hitman is forced to do one last job.

== Plot ==
Professional hitman John Connor carries out his final assassination and retires. His handler McNeal wants him for one more execution, which he promises will be the final one. Connor insists he is retired and refuses to take the assignment, until coerced by McNeal, who threatens to harm Connor's estranged wife. Connor cooperates in the preparations for the hit, but suddenly aborts the mission and flees. At the climax of the film, Connor confronts McNeal.

== Cast ==
- Patrick McGoohan as John Connor
- Lee Van Cleef as McNeal
- Edna O'Brien as Kathleen
- Donal McCann as Ryan
- Ronan Wilmot as Flynn
- Kevin Flood as Duval
- Joe Lynch as Devane
- Derek Lord as Casey
- Michael Muldoon as Hogan
- John Cowley as graveyard caretaker
- James A. Stephens as 1st mercenary
- Richard McAdoo as 2nd mercenary
- Peter Brayham as French hitman
- Mesag Muruko as Father Cressy

== Production ==
Co-writer Richard Ryan was the initial director, but was replaced early in production by Michael Dryhurst.

The film was made at The National Film Studios of Ireland (later renamed Ardmore Studios) in Bray, Ireland and on location. Connor's white cottage "Trapper" is on the Luggala Estate in Roundwood, County Wicklow. Kathleen delivers her monologue at St. Kevin's Kitchen, Glendalough, County Wicklow.

== Soundtrack ==
- "Events in Dense Fog" and "Patrolling Wire Borders" (the latter incorrectly listed in the film's credits as "A Measured Room") from the album Music for Films by Brian Eno (EG Records, 1978).
- "The Dear Irish Boy" performed by Tommy Potts (solo violin) from the album The Liffey Banks (Claddagh Records, 1972).

== Critical reception ==
In British Crime Film: Subverting the Social Order, Barry Forshaw writes: "Dryhurst’s paring down of narrative, dialogue and performance to a bare minimum pays dividends and the film has a cold, affectless sheen which commands attention".

The Radio Times gave the film 2/5 stars, writing: "The scenery is breathtaking, but that scarcely compensates for the dour story and the lacklustre performances".

The film was shown at the 2010 Edinburgh Film Festival "Retrospective: After the Wave" event.

== Releases ==
The film was released on DVD by Network in 2009.
