= Oriental Nights =

1960 film

- Directed by: Heinz Paul
- Written by: Wolf Neumeister
- Produced by: Heinz Paul
- Starring: Marina Petrova; Pero Alexander; Karl Lieffen
- Cinematography: Franz Weihmayr
- Edited by: Karl Aulitzky
- Music by: Gert Wilden
- Production company: H.P. Filmproduktion
- Distributed by: Union-Film
- Release date: 3 March 1960
- Running time: 86 minutes
- Country: West Germany
- Language: German

Oriental Nights (German: Orientalische Nächte) is a 1960 West German crime film directed by Heinz Paul and starring Marina Petrova, Pero Alexander and Karl Lieffen.

== Cast ==
- Marina Petrova as Maryse
- Pero Alexander as Korff
- Karl Lieffen as Pierre
- Barbara Laage as Arlette
- Gerti Gordon as Stasi
- Reinhard Kolldehoff as Jemzeff
- Eduard Linkers as Tomaides
- Viktor Afritsch
- Rolf von Nauckhoff
- Mario del Marius as Dancer
- Hanita Hallan as Dancer
- Iban Sangare as Dancer
- Erika Nein as Dancer
- Angela Hartmann
- Al Hoosmann
- The Nilsen-Brothers as Singers

== Bibliography ==
- Joachim Lembach. The standing of the German cinema in Great Britain after 1945. Edwin Mellen Press, 2003.
