= Roy Jenson =

Canadian American actor and football player (1927–2007)

- Jenson in Every Which Way but Loose (1978)
- Born: Roy Cameron Jenson; February 9, 1927; Calgary, Alberta, Canada
- Died: April 24, 2007 (aged 80); Los Angeles, California, U.S.
- Other name: Roy Jensen
- Education: University of California, Los Angeles
- Occupations: Actor, stuntman, Canadian football player
- Years active: 1951–1999
- Spouses: Barbara Dionysius; Marina Petrowa (m. 1964)
- Children: 3, including Sasha Jenson
- Relatives: George Jenson (brother)
- Military career
- Allegiance: United States
- Branch: United States Navy
- Conflicts: World War II
- Football career

Profile
- Positions: G, LB

Personal information
- Listed height: 6 ft 2 in (1.88 m)
- Listed weight: 210 lb (95 kg)

Career information
- College: UCLA

Career history
- 1951–55: Calgary Stampeders
- 1956–57: BC Lions

Awards and highlights
- CFL All-Star (1954)

Roy Cameron Jenson (also spelled Jensen; February 9, 1927 – April 24, 2007) was a Canadian-American actor, stunt performer, and Canadian football player.

== Early life and education ==
Jenson was born in Calgary, Alberta, and moved to Los Angeles with his family as a child. His brother was visual effects artist George Jenson. He was a lumberjack and a construction worker before he joined the United States Navy during World War II.

After the war he graduated from the University of California, Los Angeles, where he was a member of the Delta Tau Delta fraternity and played football.

== Professional football career ==
Jenson was selected during the 1951 CFL draft, taken by the Calgary Stampeders. He played five seasons with the Stampeders as a Guard. He was a CFL All-Star in 1954. While still playing for the Stampeders, Jenson was recruited as a stuntman for the Calgary-shot Hollywood film River of No Return.

In 1955, he was traded to the BC Lions, where he played for two seasons. He retired at the end of the 1957 season.

== Acting career ==
=== Film ===
After retiring from football he moved back to Los Angeles, where he found regular work as a stunt performer. Following a well-received role as a thug in Harper (1966), starring Paul Newman, he began to work regularly as an actor.

A prolific character actor, Jenson appeared in such films as The Missouri Traveler, Warlock, 13 Ghosts, How the West Was Won, Waterhole No. 3, Our Man Flint, Big Jake, Bustin' Loose, Soylent Green, The Getaway, The Way We Were, The Outfit and Chinatown.

He also worked frequently with directors John Milius (Dillinger, The Wind and the Lion, Red Dawn) and Clint Eastwood (Thunderbolt and Lightfoot, The Gauntlet, Every Which Way but Loose, Any Which Way You Can, Honkytonk Man), as well as actor Geoffrey Lewis.

As a stuntman, he notably doubled for Robert Mitchum, Richard Egan, and Aldo Ray.

=== Television ===
Jenson guest starred on NBC's television series Daniel Boone during the fourth season (1968–1969); however, he is remembered by many as the first man beaten up by Caine on the television series Kung Fu (1972), for his appearance in the Star Trek episode "The Omega Glory" and as the thug Puddler in Harper, he worked frequently in television in the 1970s and 1980s.

He also appeared in 1966 as “Troy” (a murdering outlaw) in S12E2's “Goldtakers” on the TV Western Series Gunsmoke and "Moonface" (another assassin) on S1E10 of T.H.E.Cat.

He also appeared in 1967 as “Dace Edwards” (a ranch hand) in S3E6's “Ladykiller” on the TV Western Series The Big Valley.

He also appeared in episodes 11 and 12 of Batman in 1966, was the English newspaper printer in Season 5, Episode 136–2 of Bonanza, appeared in an episode of The Silent Force in 1970, and in 1976 guest-starred in an episode of Gibbsville.

== Personal life ==
Jenson was married twice. His second marriage was to Serbian actress Marina Petrova. He had three children, including actor Sasha Jenson.

=== Death ===
Jenson died of cancer in Los Angeles, California, aged 80.

== Filmography ==
=== Film ===
- Westward the Women (1951) – (uncredited)
- Operation Secret (1952) – Michel (uncredited)
- Fighter Attack (1953) – German Soldier (uncredited)
- Demetrius and the Gladiators (1954) – Gladiator (uncredited)
- The Caine Mutiny (1954) – Sailor (uncredited)
- Broken Lance (1954) – Bailiff (uncredited)
- The Harder They Fall (1956) – Fighter (uncredited)
- Hell on Devil's Island (1957) – Bruiser No. 1 (uncredited)
- Operation Mad Ball (1957) – Hospital Guard (uncredited)
- The Missouri Traveler (1958) – Simpson
- Buchanan Rides Alone (1958) – Hamp (uncredited)
- The Last Hurrah (1958) – Fighter (uncredited)
- Ride Lonesome (1959) – Outlaw (uncredited)
- Al Capone (1959) – Customer (uncredited)
- Warlock (1959) – Hasty (uncredited)
- Career (1959) – Jeep Soldier (uncredited)
- The Rise and Fall of Legs Diamond (1960) – Bodyguard (uncredited)
- Bells Are Ringing (1960) – Cop (uncredited)
- 13 Ghosts (1960) – Ghost (uncredited)
- Let No Man Write My Epitaph (1960) – Whitey (uncredited)
- North to Alaska (1960) – Ole – Logger Punched by Sam (uncredited)
- Flaming Star (1960) – Matt Holcom (uncredited)
- The Wackiest Ship in the Army (1960) – Shark Bait – USS Echo Crewman (uncredited)
- The Fiercest Heart (1961) – Boer (uncredited)
- Atlantis, the Lost Continent (1961) – Guard (uncredited)
- Marines, Let's Go (1961) – Sailor (uncredited)
- The George Raft Story (1961) – Biggie (uncredited)
- Confessions of an Opium Eater (1962) – Boat Crewman (uncredited)
- Five Weeks in a Balloon (1962) – Guard (uncredited)
- How the West Was Won (1962) – Henchman (uncredited)
- Law of the Lawless (1964) – Roy Johnson
- Stage to Thunder Rock (1964) – Harkins
- 36 Hours (1964) – Soldier (uncredited)
- Baby the Rain Must Fall (1965) – Tough Patron (uncredited)
- Black Spurs (1965) – Ambusher (uncredited)
- The Great Race (1965) – Saloon Brawler (uncredited)
- Morituri (1965) – Merchant Marine (uncredited)
- Blindfold (1965) – Goon (uncredited)
- Apache Uprising (1965) – Sgt. Hogan
- Daniel Boone: Frontier Trail Rider (1966) – Cash Doyle
- Our Man Flint (1966) – Gridley – a Guard (uncredited)
- Harper (1966) – Puddler
- Smoky (1966) – Ranchhand (uncredited)
- Red Tomahawk (1967) – Prospector #2
- Hostile Guns (1967) – Troublemaking Spectator
- Waterhole #3 (1967) – Doc Quinlen
- Will Penny (1967) – Boetius Sullivan
- The Bandits (1967) – Josh Racker
- The Ambushers (1967) – Karl
- The Helicopter Spies (1968) – Carl
- Jigsaw (1968) – Arnie
- 5 Card Stud (1968) – Mace Jones
- Un extraño en la casa (1968) – Walter
- Number One (1969) – Roy Nelson
- Paint Your Wagon (1969) – Hennessey
- Halls of Anger (1970) – Harry Greco
- Fools (1970) – Man in park
- Sometimes a Great Notion (1970) – Howie Elwood
- Big Jake (1971) – Gunman at Bathhouse in Escondero (uncredited)
- Brute Corps (1971) – Quinn
- Journey Through Rosebud (1972) – Park Ranger
- Cry for Me, Billy (1972) – Blacksmith
- The Life and Times of Judge Roy Bean (1972) – Outlaw
- The Getaway (1972) – Cully
- Soylent Green (1973) – Donovan
- Dillinger (1973) – Samuel Cowley
- The Way We Were (1973) – Army Captain
- The Outfit (1973) – Al
- The Treasure of Jamaica Reef (1974) – Chief Killer (uncredited)
- Thunderbolt and Lightfoot (1974) – Dunlop
- Chinatown (1974) – Claude Mulvihill
- Nightmare Honeymoon (1974) – Sandy
- 99 and 44/100% Dead (1974) – Jake
- Breakout (1975) – Sheriff Spencer
- The Wind and the Lion (1975) – Admiral Chadwick
- Framed (1975) – Haskins
- Breakheart Pass (1975) – Chris Banion
- Helter Skelter (1976) – Punchy
- The Duchess and the Dirtwater Fox (1976) – Bloodworth
- The Car (1977) – Ray Mott
- Telefon (1977) – Doug Stark
- The Gauntlet (1977) – Biker
- Every Which Way but Loose (1978) – Woody (Black Widow)
- Tom Horn (1980) – Lee Mendenhour
- Foolin' Around (1980) – Blue
- Any Which Way You Can (1980) – Moody (Black Widow)
- Demonoid (1981) – Mark Baines
- Bustin' Loose (1981) – Klan Leader
- Honkytonk Man (1982) – Dub
- Red Dawn (1984) – Mr. Morris
- Day of the Survivalist (1986)
- The Night Stalker (1987) – Cook
- Deadly Stranger (1988) – Charlie
- Sudamerica, matar o morir (1989)
- Solar Crisis (1990) – Bartender
- The Set-Up (1995) – Older Guard

=== Television ===
- Not for Hire (1959) – episode – The Hunting License
- Wagon Train (1959) – episode – The Estaban Zamora Story – Watkins (uncredited)
- Peter Gunn (1959) – episode – The Lederer Story – Dutch
- Wagon Train (1959) – episode – The Greenhorn Story – Bully (uncredited)
- Yancy Derringer (1959) – episode – Longhair – Capt. MacBain (credited as “Roy Jensen”)
- Bonanza (1959) – episode – The Magnificent Adah – Sledge (uncredited)
- Peter Gunn (1960) – episode – The Long Green Kill – Frank Garrett
- Perry Mason (1961) – episode – The Case of the Malicious Mariner – Officer
- Peter Gunn (1961) – episode – The Murder Bond – Regan
- Bonanza (1963) – episode – The Prime of Life – Jesse Wade
- Rawhide (1964) – episode – Incident of the Odyssey – Bit Part (uncredited)
- The Man from U.N.C.L.E. (1964) – episode – The Vulcan Affair – Assassin (uncredited)
- Bonanza (1965) – episode – Five Sundowns to Sunup – Gang Member (uncredited)
- Bonanza (1965) – episode – The Brass Box – Harry
- Daniel Boone (1965) – episode – The Trek – Jensen
- Laredo (1966) – episode – That's Noway, Thataway – Brawler (uncredited)
- T.H.E. Cat Episode 1 (1966) – Stavic
- T.H.E. Cat Episode 10 (1966) – Moonface
- I Spy (1966) – episode – It's All Done with Mirrors – Tate
- Batman (1966) – episodes – A Riddle a Day Keeps the Riddler Away & When the Rat's Away, the Mice Will Play – Whitey
- Daniel Boone (1966) – episode – The High Cumberland: Parts 1 & 2 – Cash Doyle
- Gunsmoke (1966) – episode – The Goldtakers – Troy
- The Man from U.N.C.L.E. (1967) – episode – The Prince of Darkness Affair: Parts I & II – Carl
- The Invaders (1967) – episode – The Mutation – Alien #1
- I Spy (1967) – episode – Magic Mirror – Roschovsky
- The Andy Griffith Show (1967) – episode – Andy's Investment – Trooper Leroy Miller
- Hondo (1967) – episode – Hondo and the Judas – Bob Ford
- Mannix (1967) – episode – Catalogue of Sins – Duane Toohey
- The Virginian (1968) – episode – The Storm Gate – Lueders
- Star Trek (1968) – episode – The Omega Glory – Cloud William
- Mission: Impossible (1968) – episode – The Killing – Connie
- Daniel Boone (1968) – episode – Hero's Welcome – Luke
- I Spy (1968) – episode – Tag, You're It – Abrams
- Gunsmoke (1968) – episode – Railroad – Larnen
- Gunsmoke (1968) – episode – The Victim – Crow
- Bonanza (1969) – episode – The Wish – Craig
- Daniel Boone (1969) – episode – The Road to Freedom – Crane Hawkins
- The High Chaparral (1970) – episode – The Guns of Johnny Rondo – Jed Tate
- Gunsmoke (1970) – episode – The Scavengers – Rath
- Gunsmoke (1970) – episode – The Badge/II – Keller
- The F.B.I. (1970) – episode – The Dealer – Lobb McCoy
- Bearcats! (1971) – pilot movie – Powderkeg – Briggs
- Nichols (1971) – episode – The One Eyed Mule's Time Has Come – Bull
- Mannix (1971) – episode – The Man Outside – First Man
- Bonanza (1972) – episode – Forever – Mr. Hanley
- Cannon (1972) – episode – Murder by Moonlight – Swede
- Kung Fu (1972) – episode – Pilot – Fuller
- Kung Fu (1973) – episode – Superstition – Rupp
- Movin' On (1974) – episode – In Tandem – Attendant (uncredited)
- Mannix (1974) – episode – Trap for a Pigeon – Ozzie
- Gunsmoke (1974) – episode – The Colonel – Jeff Higgins
- Kojak (1976) – episode – Dead Again – Frank Kelton
- Little House on the Prairie (1976) – episode – The Bully Boys – George Galender
- Barnaby Jones (1976) – episode – Silent Vendetta – Hastings
- How the West Was Won (1977) – episode – Episode #1.1 – Sergeant Macklin
- Quincy, M.E. (1977) – episode – The Hero Syndrome – Jake Hennafy
- The Rockford Files (1977) – episodes – The Trees, the Bees and T.T. Flowers: Parts 1 & 2 – Winchell
- Charlie's Angels (1978) – episode – Mother Angel – Max
- Vega$ (1979) – episode – Classic Connection – First Assistant
- Fantasy Island (1979) – episode – Goose for the Gander/The Stuntman – Snuffy Harris
- How the West Was Won (1979) – TV miniseries – episode – The Slavers – Trako
- The Dukes of Hazzard (1980) – episode – The Great Santa Claus Chase – Lacey
- Simon & Simon (1982) – episode – The Hottest Ticket in Town – Nelson
- Bret Maverick (1982) – episode – Dateline: Sweetwater – Monte
- Quincy M.E. (1983) – episode – Guilty Until Proven Innocent – Dade
- Simon & Simon (1983) – episode – D.J., D.O.A. – Tony
- Magnum, P.I. (1986) – episode – One Picture Is Worth – Jack Wilkins
- Knight Rider (1986) – episode – The Scent of Roses – Purdue
- Kung Fu: The Movie (1986) – TV Movie – Warehouse Foreman
- Dallas (1986) – episode – Return to Camelot: Part 1
- Simon & Simon (1987) – episode – Desperately Seeking Dacody – Trucker Fred
- Simon & Simon (1987) – episode – Tanner, P.I. for Hire – Artie Pike
- Police Story: The Watch Commander (1988) – TV movie – Kearns

=== Stuntman ===
Note: Jenson went uncredited as a Stuntman in all the films he did.

- Samson and Delilah (1949)
- The Restless Gun (1957) – TV series – unknown episodes – Credited
- The Buccaneer (1958)
- Warlock (1959)
- Flaming Star (1960)
- North to Alaska (1960)
- Atlantis, the Lost Continent (1961)
- How the West Was Won (1962)
- McLintock! (1963)
- The Great Escape (1963)
- I Spy (1965) – TV Series – unknown episodes – Credited
- Shenandoah (1965)
- The Rounders (1965)
- Camelot (1967)
- Bonanza (1967) – TV series – episode – False Witness
- Dillinger (1973)
