= Marina Petrova =

Serbian actress

- Born: February 6, 1939 (age 87); Serbia, Kingdom of Yugoslavia
- Other name: Marina Petrowa
- Occupation: Actress
- Years active: 1956–1964 (film)

Marina Gmizić, better known as Marina Petrova,(born February 6, 1939) is a Serbian film actress known for her performances in West German productions of the 1950s and 1960s such as Das Nachtlokal zum Silbermond.

She retired from acting following her marriage to Roy Jenson. Their son is actor Sasha Jenson.

== Selected filmography ==
- The Street (1958)
- Endangered Girls (1958)
- The Blue Moth (1959)
- I Spit on Your Grave (1959)
- Das Nachtlokal zum Silbermond (1959)
- Oriental Nights (1960)
- The Red Frenzy (1962)

== Bibliography ==
- André Schneider. Die Feuerblume: Über Marisa Mell und ihre Filme. 2013.
