= Operation Skagway =

Minefields-clearing military operation

Operation Skagway was a post-World War II U.S. Navy operation which required clearing the minefields in the East China Sea-Ryukyus area.

== Example of Use ==
USS Incredible (AM-249)
