= George Jenson =

Canadian-American visual effects artist

- Born: June 24, 1930; Calgary, Alberta, Canada
- Died: May 25, 2018 (aged 87); Henderson, Nevada, U. S.
- Occupation: Visual effects artist
- Spouse: Susie Jenson
- Children: 3
- Relatives: Roy Jenson (brother)

George Jenson (June 24, 1930 – May 25, 2018) was a Canadian-American visual effects artist.

== Life and career ==
Jenson was born in Calgary, Alberta. At the age of six, he and his family moved to Los Angeles, California. He served in the United States Army during the Korean War. He attended Art Students League of New York.

Jenson began his career in 1964. He was an illustrator and storyboard artist for Irwin Allen's science fiction television programs such as Voyage to the Bottom of the Sea, Lost in Space, The Time Tunnel and Land of the Giants.

In 1985, Jenson was nominated for an Academy Award in the category Best Visual Effects for the film 2010: The Year We Make Contact. His nomination was shared with Richard Edlund, Neil Krepela and Mark Stetson.

Jenson died on May 25, 2018, from complications of melanoma in Henderson, Nevada, at the age of 87.
