= Beyond the Law (1968 Italian film) =

1968 spaghetti western film by Giorgio Stegani

- Directed by: Giorgio Stegani
- Screenplay by: Mino Roli; Giorgio Stegani; Fernando Di Leo; Warren Kiefer; Inge Hilger
- Produced by: Alfonso Sansone; Luggi Waldleitner
- Starring: Lee Van Cleef; Antonio Sabàto Sr.; Gordon Mitchell; Lionel Stander
- Cinematography: Enzo Serafin
- Edited by: Sergio Montanari; Edith Schuman
- Music by: Riz Ortolani
- Production companies: Sancrosiap S.p.A.; Roxy Film GmbH & Co. KG
- Release date: 10 April 1968 (Italy)
- Running time: 93 minutes
- Countries: Italy; West Germany

Beyond the Law (Italian: Al di là della legge) is a 1968 Spaghetti Western film directed by Giorgio Stegani and starring Lee Van Cleef, Antonio Sabàto Sr. and Gordon Mitchell. It was first distributed in the United States in 1971.

== Plot ==
Three thieves successfully rob the stagecoach carrying miners' wages without anyone noticing. One of the bandits, Cudlip, becomes friends with Ben Novak, the new engineer in charge of transporting the money.

When Ben realizes Cudlip is skilled with weapons, he decides to trust him with the transport of the new wages. Cudlip agrees, but only plans to steal them again without any bloodshed. However, another group of bandits attacks the stagecoach. Thanks to Cudlip and his two accomplices, the wages still reach the town. Cudlip is declared sheriff and is given the responsibility of transporting the extracted silver from the mine. But other bandits, defeated once before, have their eyes on the cargo.

During a festival's confusion, these bandits enter the town, seize women and children from the church, and demand the silver as ransom. Cudlip complies but sets up a barricade on the road to the border, the route the bandits take, leading to their demise. Cudlip then has the chance to escape with the silver but opts for friendship with Ben. He decides to stay on the side of the law after being forced to kill his two inseparable friends who refused to surrender the silver.

== Cast ==
- Lee Van Cleef as Billy Joe Cudlip/Billy Joe Cuddler
- Antonio Sabàto as Ben Novack
- Lionel Stander as Preacher
- Graziella Granata as Sally Davis
- Gordon Mitchell as Burton
- Bud Spencer as James Cooper
- Ann Smyrner as Betty
- Herbert Fux as Denholm
- Enzo Fiermonte as Sheriff John Ferguson
- Hans Elwenspoek as Davis
- Al Hoosman as Preacher's Associate

== Release ==
Beyond the Law was released in Italy on 10 April 1968.
