= The Stranger and the Gunfighter =

1974 film by Antonio Margheriti

- American film poster
- Directed by: Anthony Dawson
- Screenplay by: Giovanni Simonelli; Antonio Margheriti
- Story by: Barth Jules Sussman
- Produced by: Carlo Ponti
- Starring: Lee Van Cleef; Lo Lieh; Patty Shepard; Femi Benussi
- Cinematography: Alejandro Ulloa
- Edited by: Giorgio Serrallonga
- Music by: Carlo Savina
- Production companies: Compagnia Cinematografica Champion; Harbor Productions; Shaw Brothers Studio; Midega Films
- Distributed by: Columbia Pictures (US)
- Release date: 1974
- Running time: 105 minutes
- Countries: Italy; United States; Hong Kong; Spain
- Box office: $1.85 million (US rentals)

Là dove non batte il sole, also known as The Stranger and the Gunfighter, Blood money and El kárate, el Colt y el impostor, is a 1974 kung fu Spaghetti Western comedy film directed by Antonio Margheriti and starring Lo Lieh and Lee Van Cleef. The film is based upon an original screenplay by Barth Jules Sussman who received sole screenplay credit as can be seen in the film credits. The names of the other writers listed elsewhere in this article were attached after production ended, to take advantage of Italian tax rebates. It was produced by the Shaw Brothers Studio in collaboration with an Italian company, and filmed on location in Hong Kong and Spain. For English-language release, the film was retitled The Stranger and the Gunfighter and Blood Money.

The film's plot involves treasure hunting in the Old West. A martial artist and a thief are tasked with retrieving a buried treasure on behalf of a warlord who formerly owned it. They will have to collect the various segments of a treasure map, while competing with rival treasure hunters.

== Synopsis ==
Martial arts expert Ho Chiang journeys to America's Wild West on a life-or-death mission: he must retrieve his late uncle Wang's missing fortune and return it to a powerful Warlord (the original owner of the fortune) within a year, or his family will be executed. Ho frees the thief who unintentionally killed his uncle after blowing Wang's safe, Dakota, as he needs a guide to this new and unknown world.

The only clue they have is 4 photographs of women's butts, alongside their addresses, noted as being Wang's buried treasure. Ho realizes that by treasure his uncle meant that tattooed on buttocks of all four mistresses there is a hidden message in chinese. Armed with photographs of the addresses of the women, Ho and Dakota form an uneasy alliance and set out in search of the map tattoos and the promised riches, only to be closely followed by a bloodthirsty preacher, Yancy Hobbit, who wants to divide the fortune between himself, a strong Aboriginal ringfighter and a gang of mexican banditos.

== Cast ==
- Lee Van Cleef ... Dakota
- Lo Lieh ... Ho Chiang
- Patty Shepard ... Russian mistress & her twin-sister
- Femi Benussi ... Italian mistress
- Karen Yeh ... Chinese mistress
- Julián Ugarte ... Yancey Hobbitt
- Erika Blanc ... American mistress
- Tung-Kua Ai ... Uncle Wang (uncredited)
- Barta Barri ... Sheriff (uncredited)
- Chan Shen ... Warlord's Commanding Officer (uncredited)
- Chen Ping ... Wang's sister (uncredited)
- Ching Miao ... Mr. Wang (uncredited)
- Gene Collins ... Fight Promoter (uncredited)
- Paul Costello ... Wang's Lawyer (uncredited)
- Manuel de Blas ... Brothel Owner (uncredited)
- Anita Farra (uncredited)
- Lo Wai ... Warlord guard (uncredited)
- Ricardo Palacios ... Calico (uncredited)
- Goyo Peralta ... Indio (uncredited)
- George Rigaud ... Lord Barclay (uncredited)
- Wang Chiang ... Royal guard (uncredited)
- Yuen Cheung-yan ... Royal guard (uncredited)

== Production ==
The Stranger and the Gunfighter was produced at a time when the Shaw Brothers were attempting to branch into more international co-productions, often genre-bending. The same year also saw the Shaw Brothers Studio teaming with the UK's Hammer Studios to produce The Legend of the 7 Golden Vampires, a kung fu gothic horror film.
