= Giancarlo Santi =

Italian filmmaker (1939–2021)

Giancarlo Santi (7 October 1939 – 22 February 2021) was an Italian filmmaker.

Born in Rome, Santi began his career as production assistant of Gian Vittorio Baldi, later became assistant director of Marco Ferreri (L'ape regina, La Donna scimmia, Controsesso, Marcia nuziale).

Santi collaborated with Sergio Leone on The Good, the Bad and the Ugly and Once Upon a Time in the West. He was chosen by Leone to direct Duck, You Sucker! after Peter Bogdanovich was fired, but the American production rejected this decision and Leone was forced to direct the movie himself. At any rate, Santi was the second unit director.

He finally debuted as director in 1972, with the spaghetti western The Grand Duel.

He was also production manager in Glauber Rocha's The Seven Headed Lion and Ermanno Olmi's Cammina, cammina.

Santi died in Rome on 22 February 2021 at the age of 81.
