= Brethren of the Coast =

Loose coalition of pirates in the Caribbean in the 17th and 18th centuries

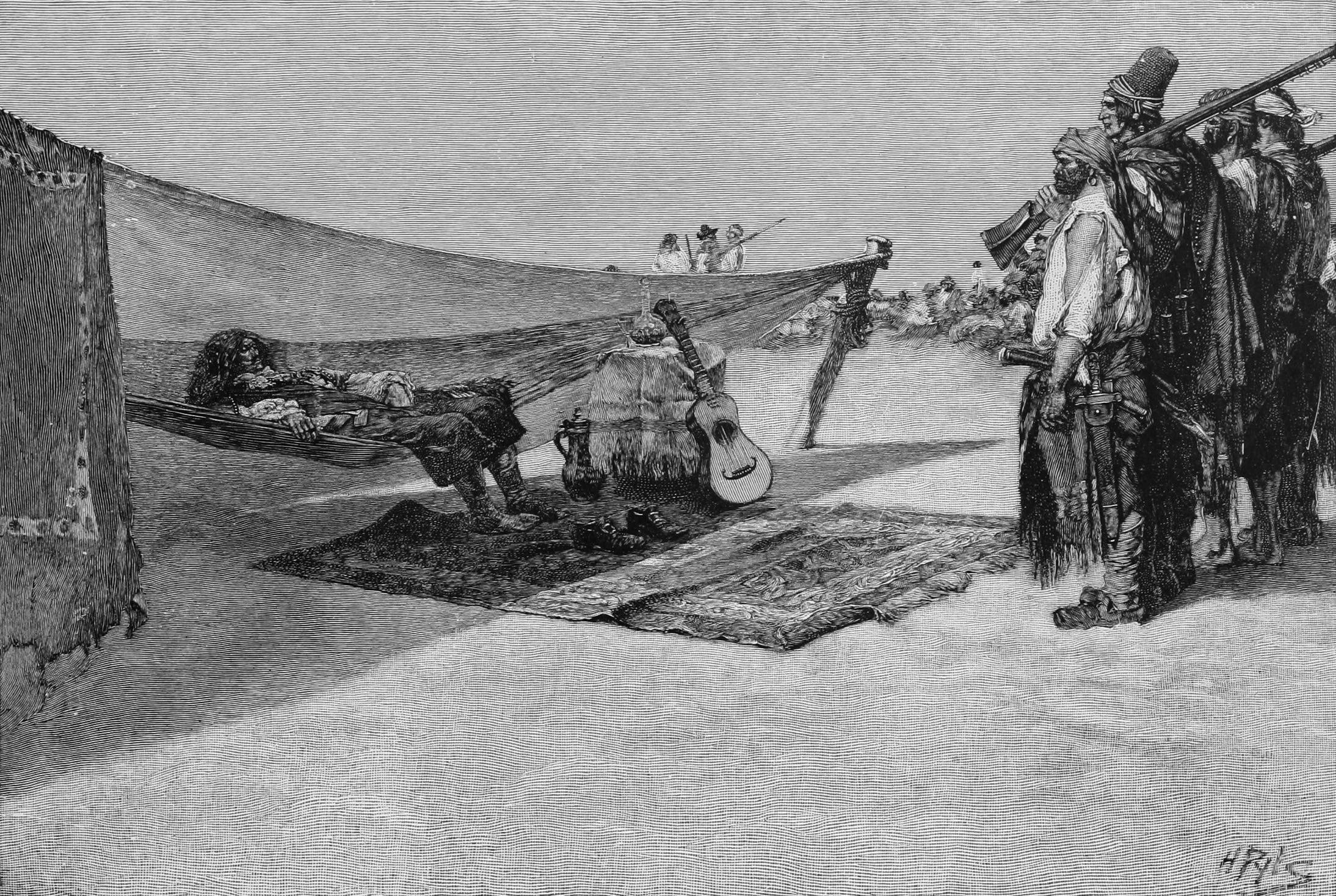
Henry Morgan recruiting his brethren for an attack on Portobelo in Panama

The Brethren or Brethren of the Coast were a loose coalition of pirates and buccaneers that were active in the 17th and 18th centuries in the Atlantic Ocean, Caribbean Sea, and Gulf of Mexico. They mostly operated in two locations, the island of Tortuga off the coast of Haiti and in the city of Port Royal on the island of Jamaica.

The Brethren were a syndicate of captains with letters of marque and reprisal who regulated their privateering enterprises within the community of privateers and with their outside benefactors. They were primarily private individual merchant mariners of Protestant background, usually of English and French origin.

== History ==
They were originally refugees who settled in Hispaniola, mostly French Huguenots and British Protestants. They would supply wares to visiting ships in exchange for guns and ammunition, an activity which led to the Spanish driving them out. These former refugees lived in something akin to a republic. Despite their origins their ranks swelled as they were joined by other adventurers of various nationalities, including Spaniards, African sailors, as well as escaped slaves and outlaws of various sovereigns.

The English had their heyday around the 1650s, when they seized Tortuga from the Spanish. These privateers were issued letters of marque to defend the island from the Spanish and raid Catholic French and Spanish shipping.

Their decline can be attributed to various factors. The peace between William of Orange and Spain decreased the incentive in privateering. The Treaty of Madrid (1670) resulted in the English renouncing privateering in the Caribbean and Jamaica being recognised as an English possession by the Spanish crown. In addition the demographic changes which featured a rise in slave labor in the Caribbean islands was a compounding factor. Most maritime families moved to the mainland colonies of the future United States or to their home countries. A few, unable to compete effectively with slave labor, enamored of easy riches, or out of angst continued to maintain the Brethren of the Coasts as a purely criminal organization which preyed upon all civilian maritime shipping without the legal endorsement of any government. This second era of the Brethren began the so-called Golden Age of Piracy and brigandage which affected the Caribbean until socioeconomic and military changes of the late 17th and early 18th century finally caused its decline. Many pirates made their journeys there, and one of the most famous was Alexandre Exquemelin.

== Code of conduct ==
In keeping with their Protestant and mostly common-law heritage, the Brethren were governed by codes of conduct that favored legislative decision-making, hierarchical command authority, individual rights, and equitable division of revenues. Henry Morgan, one of the most well-known Brethren, is usually credited with codifying its organization.

== In media ==
Disney's Pirates of the Caribbean franchise featured a fictionalized, romanticized version called Brethren Court. They were first introduced in the film Pirates of the Caribbean: At World's End, and appeared in other media, including the five-part Legends of the Brethren Court book series and the adult novel The Price of Freedom. At World's End screenwriters Ted Elliott and Terry Rossio, inspired by the real-life confederation of pirates, looked at historical figures and created fictional characters "from all over the world" to expand the scope beyond the main cast. The Pirate Lords include Captain Jack Sparrow (Caribbean Sea), Hector Barbossa (Caspian Sea), Ammand the Corsair (Black Sea), Chevalle (Mediterranean Sea), Sri Sumbhajee (Indian Ocean), Mistress Ching (Pacific Ocean, Gentleman Jocard (Atlantic Ocean), Eduardo Villanueva (Adriatic Sea), and Sao Feng (South China Sea). Elizabeth Swann becomes the successor to Feng, and becomes the Pirate King by default as a result of the vote. Captain Teague, the Keeper of the Pirata Codex, was also the Pirate Lord of Madagascar, originally written in the At World's End screenplay, and later adapted into books, such as Legends of the Brethren Court and The Price of Freedom. In At World's End, the Pirate Lords of the Brethren Court meet at Shipwreck Cove, where they make a last plan of action against the onslaughts of Cutler Beckett and the East India Trading Company armada. The Brethren was also named "Brethren of the Coast" in The Pcie of Freedom.

== See also ==
- Piracy in the Caribbean
- Pirate Republic
- Victual Brothers
- Thalassocracy
- Henry Morgan
