= Pirates of the Caribbean: Jack Sparrow =

Series of children's books, prequels to the Pirates feature film series

Pirates of the Caribbean: Captain Jack Sparrow
- The box set of The Quest for the Sword of Cortés containing the first four novels of the series
- The Coming Storm; The Siren Song; The Pirate Chase; The Sword of Cortés; The Age of Bronze; Silver; City of Gold; The Timekeeper; Dance of the Hours; Sins of the Father; Poseidon's Peak; Bold New Horizons; The Tale of Billy Turner and Other Stories
- Author: Liz Braswell, Carla Jablonski, Tui T. Sutherland and other authors under the pseudonym of Rob Kidd
- Cover artist: Jean-Paul Orpinas; Maria Elena Naggi
- Country: United States
- Language: English
- Genre: Children's novel
- Publisher: Disney Press
- Published: 2006–2009
- Media type: Print (Paperback)
- Followed by: Pirates of the Caribbean: Legends of the Brethren Court

Pirates of the Caribbean: Jack Sparrow is a series of novels for young readers written by Liz Braswell, Carla Jablonski, Tui T. Sutherland and other authors under the shared pseudonym of Rob Kidd. The series is published by Disney Press and was written as a literary companion to the Pirates of the Caribbean films. The books are about Jack Sparrow's teen years before he becomes a pirate. It is followed by Pirates of the Caribbean: The Price of Freedom and the series Pirates of the Caribbean: Legends of the Brethren Court, set thirteen years before the film Pirates of the Caribbean: The Curse of the Black Pearl.

== Books in the series ==
| Title | Author | Date | Length (first edition) | Ref. | ISBN |
|---|---|---|---|---|---|
| The Coming Storm | Liz Braswell and Tui T. Sutherland | May 22, 2006 | 144 pp | | 1-4231-0018-2 |
Jack and Arabella discover the magical sheath for the Sword of Cortés. They plan together to steal a ship to go look for the storied Sword of Cortés and reunite it with its sheath. Arabella directs Jack to an abandoned ship, the Barnacle. They are joined by Fitzwilliam P. Dalton III. The three come upon an island, where they meet Jean and Tumen, and Jean's sister-turned-cat Constance. Jean and Tumen lead the crew to a 'dead' city on the cursed island, where they find the skeleton of former pirate king, Stone-Eyed Sam. The crew realize that the notorious pirate, Left Foot Louis, has the sword. They all go rushing to the Barnacle, when they suddenly come face to face with Torrents, a crew member of the feared Davy Jones's crew. Jack eventually defeats Torrents and escapes on the Barnacle.
| The Siren Song | Carla Jablonski | May 22, 2006 | 128 pp | | 1-4231-0019-0 |
After many days at sea, the crew of the Barnacle fall under the spell of the Sirens. The mermaids make a deal with Jack that when the crew eventually gets the Sword of Cortes, they will return to the mermaid kingdom and give them the thing Jack values most. Later, Jack realizes to his horror that the thing he values most is his freedom. Thus, he has sold himself to the Sirens.
| The Pirate Chase | unknown | July 24, 2006 | 128 pp | | 1-4231-0020-4 |
Jack and company stop on the island of Isla Esqueletica, where they meet Left Foot Louis and two of his pirates. The Barnacle's crew and Left Foot Louis get into a fight. Arabella grabs the Sword from Louis and, accidentally invoking its power, makes Louis evaporate. Arabella is devastated, claiming she killed him, but was brought to sense by Jack and Fitzwilliam. Jack, Arabella, and the others, are shocked, but are relieved that their greatest foe is gone. Jack then reunites the Sword with its sheath, and after reciting a spell, the sword's previous owner, Hernán Cortés, appears before them.
| The Sword of Cortés | unknown | September 12, 2006 | 128 pp | | 1-4231-0061-1 |
Jack is tutored by Cortés on how to use the sword. Jack, taken in by the power of the sword, begins abandoning his friends to learn how to control the power by Cortés. It is revealed that the sword needs to be by the eye of Stone-Eyed-Sam to work at maximum power. Jack reclaims the eye and returns to the island. Jack realizes that Cortés was merely using him and intends to reclaim his former sword. In a tragic turn of events, Tumen dies from his mysterious illness. The spirit of Montecuhzoma appears and battles Cortés to the death. Jack uses the power of the sword one last time to bring the villagers back, and Tumen is miraculously revived. The crew decides to go to Tumen's village in the Yucatan, as he has not been to his home since he was sold into slavery.
| The Age of Bronze | Liz Braswell | November 21, 2006 | 144 pp | | 1-4231-0168-5 |
The Barnacle's crew stop at Tumen's home village on the Yucatan Peninsula. A day later, one of the village's charmed amulets goes missing and the crew are the main suspects. They are banished from the island, and decide to go searching for the real thieves. They find the true thieves: Madame Minuit and Tim Hawk. The crew battle Madame Minuit for the amulet. Hawk turns against her and slows her down, allowing the Barnacle's crew to escape with the amulet. They all reach the Barnacle and quickly set sail. Hawk stows away on the ship and Jack agrees to let him join the crew. A few minutes later, another ship comes alongside the Barnacle and on the ship is Arabella's mother, living the life of a pirate alongside Left Foot Louis, who is cursed to work for her crew for eternity.
| Silver | Liz Braswell | January 23, 2007 | 128 pp | | 1-4231-0169-3 |
The crew of the Barnacle is forcibly brought onto the ship by Laura Smith, Captain of the ship and Arabella's mother. Jack and his friends assist Capt. Smith in putting down an attempted mutiny. Jack steals a silver gem from pirate was SilverBack, which makes SilverBack and Louis suddenly disappear. Capt. Smith kicks Jack and his friends off the ship.
| City of Gold | Liz Braswell | February 13, 2007 | 128 pp | | 1-4231-0170-7 |
Jack fights Madame Minuit in a final showdown, barely escaping with his life. At the end of the book, all of Jack's friends return to their respective homes, save Fitzwilliam. He and Jack banter back and forth about Fitz's watch, when Davy Jones surfaces beside the Barnacle and demands it.
| The Timekeeper | Rob Kidd | July 31, 2007 | 128 pp | | 1-4231-0366-1 |
Jack discovers the watch has the power to freeze time. Jack and Fitzwilliam row to shore on a nearby island, where they have several adventures. Fitz sees pterosaurs and they realize the watch can also be used for time travel.
| Dance of the Hours | Liz Braswell | September 25, 2007 | 144 pp | | 1-4231-0367-X |
Jack and Fitz run into Torrents, who hurls them into a volcano. The volcano goddess Chantico comes out saying they have till midnight to put things right. Jack and Fitzwilliam are captured by Davy Jones and run into Tia Dalma on the Flying Dutchman, who then helps them escape. Jack is told that the pocket watch must be put on the hand of someone who doesn't belong in his time and that person must also be under the sun and moon. He enters a battle with Torrents and Stone-Eyed Sam and puts the watch on Sam's wrist. At the last second, Dalma pulls the watch from Sam and everything reverts to normal. Chantico tells Dalma she will remember something and both disappear. Jack sees the pirate flag and says they have to leave. Fitz reveals he was undercover for the Navy the whole time so Jack would lead them to his father, Captain Teague.
| Sins of the Father | unknown | December 18, 2007 | 144 pp | | 1-4231-0455-2 |
Jack and his father are sent to the brig of Admiral Norrington's ship. They are set free by Teague's friend, Joshamee Gibbs. Jack and his father battle Fitzy, Norrington, and their crews. Teague rescues James Norrington, the Admiral's son, and his father chastises him about being saved by a pirate. Teague takes Jack to Isle Hermosa. In the story's epilogue, Jack gets a new boat, only large enough for one or two people, and sets sail for a new treasure.
| Poseidon's Peak | unknown | April 29, 2008 | 144 pp | | 1-4231-0456-0 |
Jack sets off to find the fabled Poseidon's Peak and the treasure it holds. He arrives on a deserted island and meets Sailor Bill, who joins Jack in his search. The two are captured by the natives, who are led by Constance Magliore. The three make a few unsuccessful attempts to escape the island. Constance finds an underwater cavern, where they discover the former crew of the Barnacle, along with Arabella's mother and her crew.
| Bold New Horizons | unknown | July 29, 2008 | 160 pp | | 1-4231-0457-9 |
A group of mermaids ask for their help keeping Poseidon's trident and chariot away from Davy Jones. Shortly after the request, Captain Torrents shows up riding the chariot and wielding Poseidon's trident. Now he has to try to find a way out. Jack and his crew get in a terrible fight with Torrents.
| The Tale of Billy Turner and Other Stories | unknown | January 27, 2009 | 256 pp | | 1-4231-1803-0 |
Tells the story of what Jack's crew did after leaving Jack and the Barnacle in City of Gold.

== Characters ==
- Captain Jack Sparrow - An adolescent stowaway (not yet a pirate) with an unknown past. In the books, he is depicted as more of an adventurer than a pirate. He is the Captain of the Barnacle.
- Fitzwilliam P. Dalton III - A young British aristocrat tired of his rich and pampered lifestyle, Fitzwilliam joins Jack's crew in the first book. Jack gave him the nickname "Fitzy".
- Arabella Smith - An adolescent barmaid being raised by her drunkard father, who owns a tavern in Tortuga. Arabella has a very retentive memory and is a walking encyclopedia of random facts. She has tousled auburn hair and bites her bottom lip when uncomfortable or worried. Due to her relationship with Billy, it is implied that she may be the mother of Will Turner, although this is never confirmed, and other media indicate that this may not be the case.
- Jean Magliore - A thirteen-year-old boy from New Orleans, he often spouts French phrases. Jean has a liking for Arabella.
- Constance Magliore - Jean's sister. She was turned into a cat by Tia Dalma.
- Tumen - A Mayan from the Yucatán sold into slavery by pirates.
- Captain Torrents - A vicious pirate captain with the ability to control storms that Jack and his crew faced in the first book.
- Left Foot Louis - Notorious pirate with two left feet that kidnapped Arabella's mother and also searched for the Sword of Cortés. Left Foot Louis has a scarred face and seeks revenge on Constance and Jean.
- Hernán Cortés - A Spanish conquistador. His ghost appears in the fourth book.
- Moctezuma - The former Aztec emperor. His spirit battles the ghost of his sworn enemy Cortés.
- Madame Minuit - A powerful and seductive creole witch from New Orleans, Jean's hometown, with the power over snakes. She stole a magical amulet from Tumen's people, resulting in the blame placed on him and exile from his own people.
- Tim Hawk - A young boy who was under the control of Madame Minuit but later turned against her and joined the Barnacle's crew.
- Laura Smith - Notorious pirate who is also Arabella Smith's mother. She seems to have a very bad relationship with her daughter, Arabella, as the two are constantly arguing. Like her daughter, Laura has a habit of biting her bottom lip.
- Mr. Silverback - Strange pirate of the ship, Fleur de la Mort. He has a crystal leg and tooth (which enables strange powers.) He is also somehow linked to the Sun and Stars Medallion. For a time, he possessed the Silver bullet.
- Tia Dalma - A powerful voodoo priestess and old acquaintance of Jack Sparrow.
- Davy Jones - A mighty heartless, immortal seaman and ruler over many siren and mermaid kingdoms in the ocean.
- Mr. Reece - The first mate of Laura Smith. He is blue-eyed and wears a red bandanna like Jack. He is also quite handsome and a skilled fighter.
- Captain Teague - Jack's father and the Captain of the Misty Lady. Calls Jack by the name "Jackie", and is Keeper of the Pirate Code.
- Billy Turner - He later becomes Bootstrap Bill Turner. He makes his first appearance in Poseidon's Peak. He and Arabella are in love.
