= Pirates of the Caribbean: Legends of the Brethren Court =

Children's book series

- Cover art for the first book in the series The Caribbean.
- The Caribbean; Rising in the East; The Turning Tide; Wild Waters; Day of the Shadow
- Author: Tui T. Sutherland as Rob Kidd
- Cover artist: Ron Velasco
- Country: United States
- Language: English
- Genre: Children's novel
- Publisher: Disney Press
- Published: 2008 - 2010
- Media type: Print (Paperback)
- Preceded by: Pirates of the Caribbean: Jack Sparrow

Pirates of the Caribbean: Legends of the Brethren Court is a series of children's novels by Tui T. Sutherland writing under the shared pseudonym of Rob Kidd. They detail the adventures of Captain Jack Sparrow as a young man after the events of the Pirates of the Caribbean: Jack Sparrow series and Pirates of the Caribbean: The Price of Freedom. The events in the books take place thirteen years before the film Pirates of the Caribbean: The Curse of the Black Pearl.

== Characters ==
- Captain Jack Sparrow - Pirate Lord of the Caribbean Sea and captain of the Black Pearl. Jack Sparrow is the youngest Pirate Lord ever to join the Brethren Court, approximately in his early to mid twenties. He is a flirtatious, charming trickster that would rather use words than physically fight, though is extremely skilled in both types of combat. In the series, he is haunted through dreams, supernatural shadows and mysterious illness by the Shadow Lord. Jack's goal is to find all the vials of Shadow Gold, which will cure all of the burdens the Shadow Lord cast on him.
- Hector Barbossa - Sparrow's first mate, who later mutinies Jack in Pirates of the Caribbean: The Curse of the Black Pearl. Competitive and critical of Jack, his plans to mutiny him are occasionally pondered in this series. Barbossa is known for his flamboyant sense of fashion, for which he is picked on by Sparrow.
- Princess Carolina - The 15-year-old tomboy Spanish princess ran away with Diego, her stable boy, in an attempt to escape an arranged marriage to a governor, described as a "cruel old man". She is immediately interested in the pirate life and fits right in with the crew of the Black Pearl. She and Marcella are extremely competitive with each other for the love of Diego. She admires female pirates, especially well-known and/or successful ones. Carolina is passionate about protecting people, specifically the crew of the Pearl, and insists on warning all of the Pirate Lords of the Shadow Lord and the threat he poses.
- Diego De Leon - The 15-year-old (approx) former stable boy from Spain helped Carolina run away and escape her fate as a miserable wife to a governor. He is extremely protective of her and will do anything he can to keep her pleased. He is the love interest in the series, both Carolina and Marcella competing for his love.
- Jean Magilore - sailed with Jack in his adventures on the Barnacle, close friend of Jack's.
- Marcella Magilore - Jean's "cousin" (possibly his sister Constance), acts in odd ways like loving fish (possibly symptoms from being a cat), claims to love Diego - really loves Gentleman Jocard.
- Gentleman Jocard (Gumbo) - former slave until he joined Jack's crew, becomes Pirate Lord of the Atlantic Ocean and takes his master's name - Gentleman Jocard.
- Billy Turner (Bootstrap Bill) - one of Jack's original crew members, married, just wants to get home to his family.
- Catastrophe Shane - always drunk, completely incompetent.
- Shadow Lord - an evil alchemist who wants to destroy Pirate Lords of the Brethren Court. The last book in the series reveals he's actually the former Pirate Lord Henry Morgan, still alive decades after his supposed death.
- Tia Dalma - A Voodoo priestess (later introduced as Calypso, the ocean goddess in Pirates of the Caribbean: At World's End).
- Eduardo Villanueva - Pirate Lord of the Adriatic Sea, who makes a deal with the Spanish Monarchy to attempt at completely controlling the Caribbean.
- Sao Feng - Pirate Lord of the South China Sea.
- Mistress Ching - Pirate Lord of the Pacific Ocean.
- Sri Sumbhajee Angria - Pirate Lord of the Indian Ocean.
- Ammand the Corsair - Pirate Lord of the Black Sea.
- Capitaine Chevalle - Pirate Lord of the Mediterranean Sea.

== Books in the series ==
| Title | Author | Date | Genre | Length | ISBN | Ref. |
|---|---|---|---|---|---|---|
| The Caribbean | Rob Kidd | October 14, 2008 | Children's novel | 240 pp (first edition) | ISBN 1-4231-1038-2 | |
Tia Dalma sends Jack Sparrow on a mission to recover nine pieces of shadow gold. If he fails, she warns, the seas will become the playground of shadows and those who survive their reign of terror will wish they had not. Reluctantly relying on the help of his untrustworthy first mate, Hector Barbossa, and a rag-tag assortment of familiar characters, Jack will take on the Shadow Lord.
| Rising in the East | Rob Kidd | December 9, 2008 | Children's novel | 224 pp (first edition) | ISBN 1-4231-1039-0 | |
Jack Sparrow heads to Asia where he must work with Mistress Ching and Sao Feng to try and stop the Shadow Lord and the East India Trading Company.
| The Turning Tide | Rob Kidd | March 17, 2009 | Children's novel | 240 pp (first edition) | ISBN 1-4231-1040-4 | |
Jack Sparrow finds himself lost in the peaks of the Himalayas.
| Wild Waters | Rob Kidd | August 18, 2009 | Children's novel | 208 pp (first edition) | ISBN 1-4231-1042-0 | |
Jack and his crew continue their quest to search for the mysterious Shadow Gold, which leads them into a confrontation with King Samuel, Pirate Lord of the Atlantic Ocean, with the aid of their former shipmate Gombo, now the pirate captain Gentleman Jocard.
| Day of the Shadow | Rob Kidd | November 17, 2010 | Children's novel | 256 pp | ISBN 9781423155058 | |
Jack and his crew are en route to France in search of the rare and powerful Shadow Gold.
