= List of Pirates of the Caribbean characters =

This is a list of characters appearing in the Pirates of the Caribbean film series.

== Main characters ==
=== Captain Jack Sparrow ===
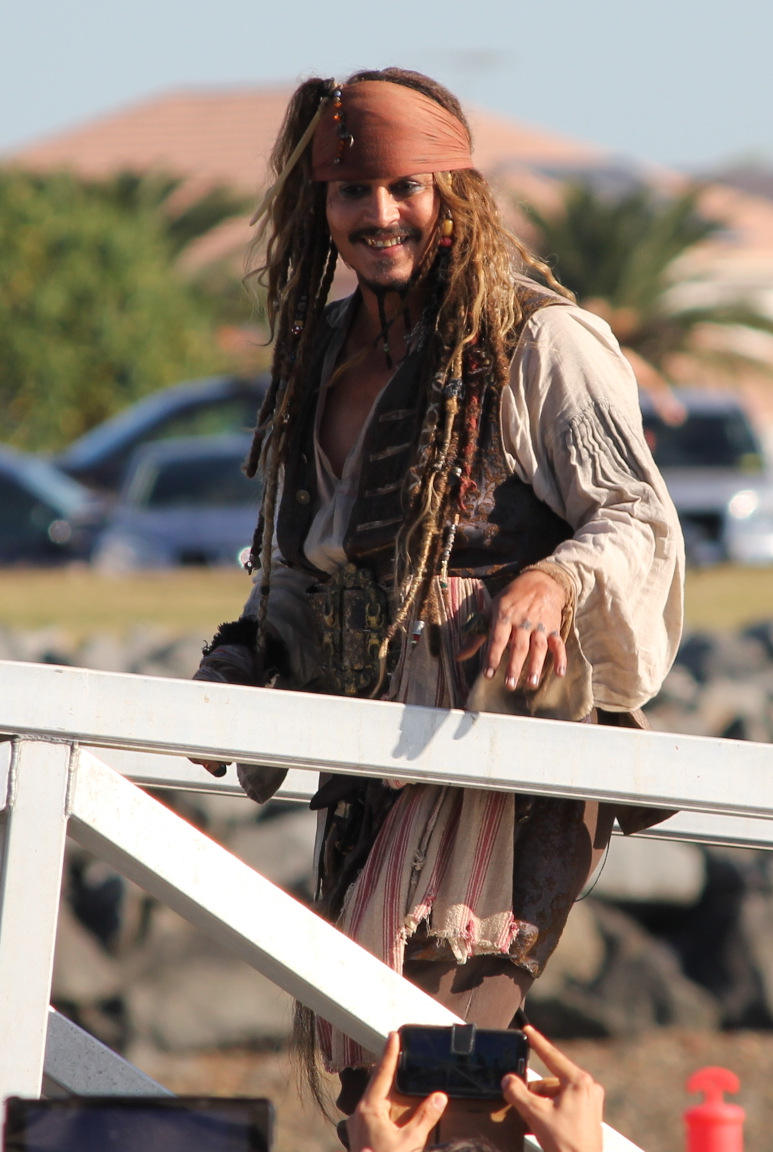
Johnny Depp portrayed Captain Jack Sparrow since the first film and was referred to as the series' central character.

Jack Sparrow's Jolly Roger, flown from the mast of the Black Pearl after becoming her captain again.

Captain Jack Sparrow is portrayed by Johnny Depp. First introduced in the film Pirates of the Caribbean: The Curse of the Black Pearl (2003), he later appears in the sequels Dead Man's Chest (2006), At World's End (2007), On Stranger Tides (2011), and Dead Men Tell No Tales (2017). With the character originally written by screenwriters Ted Elliott, Terry Rossio, Stuart Beattie, and Jay Wolpert, Depp based his characterization on The Rolling Stones guitarist Keith Richards as well as the Looney Tunes cartoon characters Bugs Bunny and Pepé Le Pew. He insists on being introduced as "Captain" Jack Sparrow.

In the first film, Sparrow is the former captain of the Black Pearl. After a mutiny by his first mate Hector Barbossa, he is left to die on an island. Though Barbossa and his crew are immortal as a result of a curse, Sparrow craves revenge. With the help of Will Turner and Elizabeth Swann, he lifts the curse and kills Barbossa.

In Dead Man's Chest, it is revealed that Sparrow once made a deal with Davy Jones. Jones raised the Black Pearl from the sea in exchange for a guarantee of service as a crewman on the Flying Dutchman. When Jones attempts to collect on the bargain, Sparrow flees. He attempts to find the Dead Man's Chest, which contains Jones's heart; this would give Sparrow leverage over Jones. At the end of the film, Sparrow is betrayed by Elizabeth Swann and dragged to Davy Jones's Locker by the Kraken.

In the third film, it is revealed that Sparrow is one of the members of the Brethren Court, acting as Pirate Lord of the Caribbean. Calypso, a sea goddess, needs all nine Pirate Lords to free her from a curse laid upon her by the original Brethren Court. She resurrects Barbossa, who is also one of the Pirate Lords, and organizes an expedition to rescue Jack from Davy Jones's Locker. Through a complex series of negotiations and betrayals, Jack schemes to kill Davy Jones and take his place as the immortal captain of the Flying Dutchman. After Will Turner is mortally wounded, Sparrow allows him to kill Jones, thus sacrificing his chance at immortality to save his friend. At the end of the film, Barbossa once again commandeers the Black Pearl, but it is revealed that Sparrow has stolen the ship's charts which point the way towards the Fountain of Youth.

In the fourth film, Jack journeys on a quest for the fabled Fountain of Youth. Prior to the film, he gained some renown as the pirate who knew and memorized its location. Jack arrives in London to rescue his first mate Joshamee Gibbs as a disguised judge before finding himself in the forced audience with King George II and Hector Barbossa, now a privateer who lost his leg and the Black Pearl, which he believed to be sunk. (Note: Screenwriter Terry Rossio released his unproduced screenplay for Pirates of the Caribbean: Dead Men Tell No Tales (2017), which includes additional information in extensive footnotes. Pertaining to On Stranger Tides, Rossio notes that Barbossa does not know about the Black Pearl in a bottle in the fourth film, though Barbossa later shows knowledge in the fifth film.) After escaping King George's Royal Guards, Sparrow becomes reacquainted with his love interest Angelica, a woman from his past and the daughter of Blackbeard, who forces him aboard the Queen Anne's Revenge. Throughout the quest, Sparrow must contend with zombies, mermaids, and a rendezvous with Barbossa. Jack learns from Angelica that the Profane Ritual for the Fountain of Youth requires a mermaid's tear and two silver chalices located on Ponce de León's ship, the Santiago, and the person who drinks the water with the tear gets all the years of life from the other. Angelica also shows Jack Blackbeard's collection of captured, miniaturized ships in glass bottles, including the Black Pearl. After Jack figures out Hector's agenda and accuses him of it, Barbossa admits a desire for revenge against Blackbeard, detailing Blackbeard's attack on the Black Pearl. After locating the Fountain of Youth, a battle between Barbossa and Blackbeard ensues, in which Angelica cuts her hand trying to remove Barbossa's poisoned blade from Blackbeard's chest. Filling the chalices with the remaining drops of water from the Fountain, adding Syrena's tear, Jack tricks Blackbeard into drinking the chalice lacking the tear. Jack maroons Angelica on a small island, unsure if he can trust her. Later, Jack reunites with Gibbs, who used Sparrow's compass to locate and retrieved the shrunken Black Pearl in the hope of restoring it to normal size, yet determined to continue living the pirate's life.

In the fifth film, Jack is suffering a series of bad luck to the point that he trades his compass for a bottle of rum. This results in the release of Armando Salazar, an undead Spanish pirate hunter whose death in a confrontation with Jack established Jack's own reputation. When faced with execution, Jack is rescued by Henry Turner, the son of Will and Elizabeth, who seeks Jack's help in finding the Trident of Poseidon, which gives its wielder control of the seas. Jack Sparrow reunites with Hector Barbossa, who restores the Black Pearl to her former glory. At the film's conclusion, the destruction of the Trident breaks all curses on the sea, restoring Salazar to life in time for him to drown while fighting Jack while Jack reclaims the restored Pearl and Will is able to return to Elizabeth now that the Flying Dutchman no longer needs a captain.

Captain Jack Sparrow is also the subject of two series of books, Pirates of the Caribbean: Jack Sparrow and Pirates of the Caribbean: Legends of the Brethren Court, and one standalone novel, Pirates of the Caribbean: The Price of Freedom. The character has also appeared in numerous video games, such as Pirates of the Caribbean: The Legend of Jack Sparrow.

=== Captain Hector Barbossa ===
Captain Hector Barbossa, portrayed by Geoffrey Rush, appears in all five films of the franchise. With the character originally written by screenwriters Ted Elliott, Terry Rossio, Stuart Beattie, and Jay Wolpert, he was originally Captain Jack Sparrow's first mate turned archenemy, a pirate captain later revealed to be one of the nine Pirate Lords of the Brethren Court. In the fourth film, On Stranger Tides, Barbossa briefly becomes a privateer in the Royal Navy and is ordered to be Jack's guide on an expedition for the Fountain of Youth.

In the first film, Barbossa is captain of the pirate ship Black Pearl. He was the former first mate of the Black Pearl and led a mutiny against former captain, Jack Sparrow. Barbossa persuaded Jack to reveal the bearings to Isla de Muerta where the Chest of Cortez was hidden. After Sparrow divulged the location, Barbossa and the crew left Sparrow to starve on a tiny island. After stealing the gold, Barbossa and his crew became undead and unable to feel physical pleasure.

Barbossa's original pirate flag, flown from the mast of the Black Pearl during his captaincy of the ship.

To lift the curse, the crew must return all 882 medallions to the chest and offer their blood. Their shipmate Bootstrap Bill Turner believed that they deserved the curse as punishment for their mutiny, and sent one coin to his son, Will. In retaliation, Barbossa tied Bootstrap to a cannon and threw him overboard. For years, Barbossa searched for the last coin and Bootstrap Bill's child, needing both to break the curse. Elizabeth Swann takes the medallion from Will Turner when he was rescued as a young boy. Barbossa, believing she is Bootstrap Bill's daughter, kidnaps her. He later learns that Will is Bootstrap Bill's child; he captures Will and plans to execute him to break the curse. As Jack and Barbossa duel, Will breaks the curse by returning the last coin and offering his blood. Barbossa, mortal again, bleeds out from his wounds.

In Dead Man's Chest, Captain Barbossa's undead monkey "Jack" appeared aboard the Black Pearl before Jack Sparrow gave the monkey to the voodoo mystic Tia Dalma as payment. Sparrow's crew see Barbossa's corpse lying there, with only his boots visible. The final scene of the film, Barbossa is revealed to have been resurrected by Tia Dalma before biting an apple.

Returning in At World's End, Barbossa was first named "Hector" onscreen by Jack Sparrow. In the film, Barbossa joins forces with Will, Elizabeth, and the Black Pearl crew in their attempt to rescue Jack from the Locker and rally the Brethren Court against Lord Cutler Beckett. To break the curse confining her to human form, the sea goddess Calypso needs the Pieces of Eight from all nine Pirate Lords. It is for this reason that she resurrected Barbossa, the Pirate Lord of the Caspian Sea. At the meeting of the Fourth Brethren Court, Barbossa gathers the Pieces of Eight from the other pirate lords and uses them to release her. During the battle against Davy Jones, he officiates a makeshift wedding for Will and Elizabeth. After defeating Jones and Beckett, Barbossa once again steals the Black Pearl from Jack and sails in search of the Fountain of Youth, only to find out Sparrow stole the charts from Barbossa.

By the events of the fourth film, the Black Pearl is attacked by Blackbeard, who uses the power embedded in the Sword of Triton to turn the ship's own rigging against Hector Barbossa's crew, forcing Barbossa to cut off his own leg to escape with his life, turning Barbossa into a mortal enemy vowed on revenge. Unbeknownst to Barbossa, who believes the Pearl was sunk, Blackbeard magicked the ship into a glass bottle. Nevertheless, Barbossa lost his ship, his leg, and had vengeance as a goal since the very night it happened. He approached the British and offered his services as a privateer in service to King George II. By the quest for the Fountain of Youth, Barbossa gained much information and learned at least the basics on Blackbeard. Barbossa knows the name of Blackbeard's ship, his obsession to find the Fountain of Youth, and even the importance of Blackbeard's sword in that the sword had the power to rule the winds of the ocean, as well as everything associated with the wind, including the ships at sea, their rigging, sails, etc. and that its powers were diminished away from the ship. After Jack Sparrow's capture and escape from King George, Barbossa sails the HMS Providence with Joshamee Gibbs, Groves, Gillette, and an entire British crew to find the Fountain before the Spanish. Barbossa's crew continue on foot after the Providence is attacked by mermaids, while Barbossa himself rendezvouses with Jack on the Santiago, who finds the chalices have been taken by the Spanish. Before retrieving the chalices, Jack figures out Hector's agenda and accuses him of it, and Barbossa admits a desire for revenge against Blackbeard, detailing Blackbeard's attack on the Black Pearl, which he still believes was sunk. Barbossa and Blackbeard meet the Fountain of Youth, which leads to a battle between the British and pirate crews, in which Barbossa stabs Blackbeard with a poisoned sword. After that, Barbossa claims Blackbeard's ship, crew, and sword for his own, and returns to a life of piracy.

Barbossa's new pirate flag in Dead Men Tell No Tales, flown by the individual ships in his fleet, and also displayed on the main topsail of the Queen Anne's Revenge itself.

In the fifth film, Dead Men Tell No Tales, Hector Barbossa settled into a growing and prosperous pirate empire, taking possession of the Queen Anne's Revenge as a result of defeating Captain Blackbeard. While the down-on-his-luck Captain Jack Sparrow, Captain Barbossa controls a wealthy fleet of ten ships. After his fleet is threatened by the ghostly Armando Salazar, Barbossa promises to lead him to Jack Sparrow. When Sparrow escapes to an island, Barbossa promises to go to land and retrieve Sparrow, but he and his crew double-cross Salazar to team up with Sparrow, Henry Turner, and Carina Smyth to find the Trident of Poseidon. Knowing the Black Pearl was in a bottle in Sparrow's possession, Barbossa releases the Pearl from its imprisonment, restoring the ship to its former glory, and they attempt to outrun Salazar. Hector reveals in a conversation with Jack that he is Carina's father, having left Carina at an orphanage after her mother Margaret's death to give her a chance at a normal life. Barbossa also left Carina a journal with a red ruby on its cover. The journal contains a map that leads to the Trident, and Carina uses the ruby to reveal the path to the Trident. After the Trident is destroyed, resulting in Salazar becoming mortal, Salazar pursues Jack, Henry, and Carina as they try to climb to safety. As they escape, Carina learns that Hector is her father, who calls her "treasure" before sacrificing himself to kill Salazar, giving Sparrow, Carina, and Henry a chance to escape.

According to actor Geoffrey Rush, he may not appear in any future Pirates of the Caribbean movies. However, other interviews imply otherwise, as producer Jerry Bruckheimer said they can bring characters back, and Rush himself did not seem completely opposed to returning to the series because he said, "[Barbossa] could come back like Hamlet's father, as a ghost. Just to annoy Jack."

=== Joshamee Gibbs ===
Joshamee Gibbs, portrayed by Kevin McNally, appears in all five films of the franchise. With the character originally written by screenwriters Ted Elliott and Terry Rossio, he was a superstitious sailor, a crew member on the Black Pearl, and the closest friend of Jack Sparrow.

In the first film Gibbs appears as a petty officer in the Royal Navy. It is implied that he is the ship's boatswain as he is respected, very cynical, and drinks heavily, which are stereotypes of a boatswain. While Governor Swann and a young Elizabeth Swann travel to Port Royal, he assists in rescuing a young Will Turner from a shipwreck. Eight years later Jack Sparrow encounters Gibbs sleeping among pigs in Tortuga. Gibbs, no longer affiliated with the Royal Navy, agrees to help Jack sail HMS Interceptor as his First Mate. After Jack is captured by Barbossa, Gibbs attempts to captain Interceptor. They are swiftly overtaken by the Black Pearl and captured. Elizabeth frees Gibbs and the crew, who decide to take Black Pearl instead of rescuing Jack from Barbossa. However, Gibbs and the crew later return to Port Royal to save Jack from hanging. After Jack is rescued, Gibbs stays on as his First Mate.

In Dead Man's Chest, Gibbs, Jack and other crew members are captured by cannibals. Gibbs visits Tia Dalma with Jack. At Isla Cruces Jack leaves Gibbs on Black Pearl while searching for the Dead Man's Chest. Gibbs survives the Kraken's attack on Black Pearl in which Jack is dragged to Davy Jones's Locker. When Tia Dalma asks if the crew would do anything to save Jack, Gibbs is the first to say yes.

In At World's End, Gibbs travels to the Locker to rescue Jack. He claims to be one of the few crew members to do so "just because he missed him". He attends the Fourth meeting of the Brethren Court. At the end of the film Gibbs falls asleep, allowing Barbossa to steal Black Pearl once again.

In On Stranger Tides, Gibbs has been arrested and falsely accused of being Jack Sparrow; the real Jack impersonates a judge and gives him a life sentence instead of the death penalty. Gibbs steals Jack's maps, which show the way to the Fountain of Youth, and memorizes them. Hector Barbossa, working as a privateer, threatens to execute Gibbs if he does not betray Jack. Gibbs burns the maps, and Barbossa is forced to bring him along on the journey to the Fountain. Using Jack's compass, Gibbs finds Queen Anne's Revenge and steals Blackbeard's collection of ships which are magically imprisoned in bottles, including Black Pearl. Gibbs and Jack reunite after Blackbeard's death and discuss ways to free Black Pearl from its enchantment.

In Dead Men Tell No Tales, Gibbs serves aboard Jack's derelict ship, the Dying Gull, until he and the other crew members abandon him. He and the others are convinced by Henry Turner, Will Turner's son, to rejoin Jack on a quest for the Trident of Poseidon, but, during the journey, he learns that they are being chased by ghostly Captain Salazar, and the crew abandon Jack, Henry, and Carina Smyth on an island. Gibbs is made captain of the Dying Gull, but relinquishes this title when he spots the Royal Navy after them, appointing Scrum to be the new captain. The crew of the Gull are captured and taken aboard the Essex, which they later escape and find a restored Black Pearl under attack by Salazar and his men. Gibbs makes the executive decision to assist Jack and the Pearl, and they join the fight. Then, when Jack, Barbossa, and Carina venture onto Black Rock Island, Gibbs remains in charge of the Pearl, captaining her when Jack and co. need rescuing from one final assault by Salazar. Gibbs is present for Barbossa's death. After Henry's reunion with his father, Gibbs sets sail with Jack to waters unknown.

=== Will Turner ===
William "Will" Turner Jr. appears in the first three films in the series (The Curse of the Black Pearl, Dead Man's Chest, and At World's End) and is one of the leading men, portrayed by Orlando Bloom. With the character originally written by screenwriters Ted Elliott, Terry Rossio, Stuart Beattie, and Jay Wolpert, is the only child of pirate William "Bootstrap Bill" Turner. In the third film, Will Turner marries Elizabeth Swann and becomes captain of the Flying Dutchman after the death of Davy Jones. Nine months after Will first leaves aboard the Dutchman, Elizabeth gives birth to their son, Henry Turner. He appears in the fifth film, Dead Men Tell No Tales.

In the first film, a young Will Turner (portrayed by Dylan Smith) is rescued from a shipwreck by James Norrington and Elizabeth Swann. As an adult, Will is a blacksmith's apprentice working in Port Royal. He loves Elizabeth, although he is of a lower social class. Will helps Jack escape from Port Royal. He uses his blood to break the curse upon the crew of the Black Pearl.

In the second film, Will's wedding to Elizabeth Swann is interrupted when they are arrested for piracy. In exchange for Elizabeth's freedom, he attempts to retrieve Jack Sparrow's magical compass, which will allow Beckett to obtain the heart of Davy Jones. Along the way, he reunites with his father, who is serving as an undead crewman aboard the Flying Dutchman. Will attempts to steal the heart, but is unsuccessful.

In the third film, Will helps rescue Jack Sparrow from Davy Jones's Locker. He marries Elizabeth Swann before being fatally stabbed by Davy Jones. To save his friend, Jack Sparrow makes Will stab Jones's heart, killing him and making Will the new captain of the Dutchman, with one day ashore and ten years at sea. Will and Elizabeth consummate their marriage before Will departs with the Green Flash at sunset, leaving Elizabeth the Dead Man's Chest with his still-beating heart, which Elizabeth promises to protect before she falls pregnant. In the post credits scene, which takes place ten years later, Will returns by the Green Flash to Elizabeth, who waits with their nine-year-old son, Henry Turner. (Note: According to writers Ted Elliott and Terry Rossio, the context of the film's ending was meant to be that Will Turner's curse gets broken by Elizabeth's love, after which his task and duty of ferrying souls aboard the Flying Dutchman would be complete and the attachment to the ship would be broken. This idea was also hinted at in the "Story of Davy Jones and Calypso" feature in the At World's End video game adaptation. However, the idea was interpreted otherwise, as a leaflet inside the At World's End DVD said that Will was bound to the Flying Dutchman for all eternity, and the idea in full was never addressed in the film itself. The 2017 sequel Pirates of the Caribbean: Dead Men Tell No Tales focused on Will's son trying to save his father and break the curse.)

Will does not appear in On Stranger Tides. In the fifth film, he remains the captain of the Flying Dutchman, now cursed and bound to remain on the ship for eternity. His son, Henry, locates the Dutchman when he is a child, but Will tells him that his curse cannot be broken. As an adult, Henry joins Jack Sparrow to search for the Trident of Poseidon, which has the power to break Will's curse. After the Trident is destroyed, Will is released from his curse and reunited with Elizabeth.

=== Elizabeth Swann ===
Elizabeth Swann (later Elizabeth Turner) appears in the first three films in the series (The Curse of the Black Pearl, Dead Man's Chest, and At World's End) and is the leading lady, portrayed by Keira Knightley. With the character originally written by screenwriters Ted Elliott, Terry Rossio, Stuart Beattie, and Jay Wolpert, she is the daughter of Governor Weatherby Swann. In the third film, Elizabeth Swann becomes the Pirate King of the Brethren Court and marries Will Turner. Nine months after Will first leaves aboard the Dutchman, Elizabeth gives birth to their son, Henry Turner. She appears in the fifth film, Dead Men Tell No Tales.

In the first film, a young Elizabeth (portrayed by Lucinda Dryzek) helps rescue Will Turner from a shipwreck; she steals a pirate's medallion from Will to protect him. As an adult, she is engaged to James Norrington. Captain Barbossa captures Elizabeth. Because she possesses the medallion, he presumes she is the daughter of Bootstrap Bill Turner, whose blood is needed to lift the pirates' curse. She assists Will and Jack in defeating Barbossa.

In Dead Man's Chest, Elizabeth has ended her engagement with Norrington in favor of marrying Will Turner; their wedding is interrupted when they are arrested by Cutler Beckett for piracy. Elizabeth later kills Jack Sparrow by seducing him and chaining him to the mast of the Black Pearl, where he is dragged to Davy Jones's Locker by the Kraken.

In the third film, Elizabeth helps rescue Jack from the Locker. She becomes the pirate lord of the South China Sea after Sao Feng's death; she is later elected Pirate King by the Fourth Brethren Court. As King, she declares war on Beckett and leads the battle against him. Mid battle, Elizabeth marries Will Turner, who becomes the new captain of the Flying Dutchman after almost dying at the hands of Davy Jones. After Jones's defeat and justice for her father's murder, Elizabeth gives up piracy and returns to Jamaica, while Will leaves aboard the Dutchman, with one day ashore and ten years at sea. Elizabeth and Will consummate their marriage before Will departs with the Green Flash at sunset, leaving Elizabeth the Dead Man's Chest with his still-beating heart, which Elizabeth promises to protect before she falls pregnant. In the post credits scene, which takes place ten years later, Will returns by the Green Flash to Elizabeth, who waits with their nine-year-old son, Henry Turner.

Elizabeth does not appear in On Stranger Tides, but she appears briefly in a non-speaking role in Dead Men Tell No Tales as she and Will reunite after over 20 years apart. According to Knightley, she does not expect to do any more because they "take too long to shoot".

=== James Norrington ===
James Norrington, CB, portrayed by Jack Davenport, appears in The Curse of the Black Pearl, Dead Man's Chest, and At World's End.

In The Curse of the Black Pearl, Norrington served in the Royal Navy as a lieutenant. He was stationed aboard HMS Dauntless as it made the crossing from England to Port Royal, carrying Governor Weatherby Swann and his young daughter, Elizabeth. Upon sighting a wrecked merchant vessel, Norrington ordered his men to search for survivors, leading to the rescue of a young Will Turner. Eight years later, Captain Norrington is about to be promoted to the rank of commodore. Among those gathered for the ceremony is Elizabeth Swann, now a young woman. While the newly promoted Commodore Norrington proposes to Elizabeth Swann atop the fortress, she faints and topples over the wall into the harbor below. She is rescued by Captain Jack Sparrow, who is then arrested by Norrington. When pirates attack Port Royal and kidnap Elizabeth, Norrington pursues the pirates' ship, the Black Pearl. Will Turner and Jack Sparrow commandeer HMS Interceptor, stranding Norrington aboard the disabled Dauntless. Watching as Sparrow and Turner make off with Interceptor, Norrington grudgingly acknowledges Sparrow's unexpected cleverness and competency. Norrington pursues Sparrow and Turner with three objectives: reclaim the Interceptor, capture Jack Sparrow, and rescue Elizabeth. Barbossa sinks the Interceptor and maroons Sparrow and Elizabeth. Norrington spots Elizabeth's distress signal and rescues them. Norrington arrests Jack and ignores Elizabeth's plea to rescue Will from Barbossa, believing he has turned pirate. He only relents after Elizabeth accepts his previous marriage proposal. He asks for Jack's assistance to locate Isla de Muerta. At Isla de Muerta, Norrington and his men battle the immortal pirates. When Will Turner breaks the curse, making the pirates mortal again, Norrington's men defeat them. The commodore imprisons the surrendered pirates and returns to Port Royal with Jack Sparrow. Despite thanking him for the victory against Barbossa, Norrington reluctantly agrees to obey the law and hang Jack for piracy. Will and Elizabeth free Sparrow from the gallows, but they are quickly caught. Governor Swann pardons Will, while Sparrow escapes. Norrington graciously accepts Elizabeth's wish to marry Will, and postpones pursuing Sparrow for one day.

In Dead Man's Chest, Norrington's ship, HMS Dauntless has been lost in a hurricane. Disgraced, Norrington resigned his post and disappeared. Norrington's whereabouts are still unknown when Lord Cutler Beckett arrives in Port Royal with an arrest warrant for Norrington's part in Jack Sparrow's escape. Norrington, drinking heavily and clad in his filthy, tattered uniform, turns up in Tortuga. He applies for a position aboard Jack Sparrow's ship, Black Pearl. He soon becomes obsessed with reclaiming his honour, and seeks revenge against those he believes responsible for his downfall, notably Sparrow. At Isla Cruces, Norrington, Sparrow, and Turner duel to claim Davy Jones' heart. Norrington escapes with the chest, heart, and Letters of Marque. He is found by East India Trading Company (EITC) ships and taken to Port Royal. He offers Beckett the heart of Davy Jones in exchange for Beckett's signature on the Letters of Marque. Beckett signs the Letters, which grant Norrington a full pardon and promote him to admiral in the EITC.

In At World's End, Norrington has now regained his career. Beckett places Norrington in command of the Flying Dutchman. After the Empress attacks HMS Endeavour, Beckett orders the Flying Dutchman to pursue it. Norrington leads the boarding party and is reunited with Elizabeth Swann, who is now captain of the Empress. Though Norrington is ecstatic to find her alive, Elizabeth is hostile, accusing Norrington of serving her father's murderers. Norrington denies any knowledge of or involvement in Governor Swann's death. When the prisoners are taken to the brig, Norrington offers Elizabeth his quarters, which she refuses. Norrington releases Elizabeth and her crew from the brig, declaring that he is "choosing a side." Elizabeth forgives him and urges him to join her, but he refuses. Elizabeth escapes as Norrington is mortally wounded by Bootstrap. Arriving on the scene, Davy Jones offers Norrington a reprieve from death if he will join the crew of the Flying Dutchman. Norrington defiantly thrusts his sword into Jones' shoulder before dying.

Norrington was going to appear in Dead Men Tell No Tales, as he appeared in the early draft by Terry Rossio. (Note: This character returns in Terry Rossio's unproduced screenplay for Pirates of the Caribbean: Dead Men Tell No Tales (2017), though both characters do not appear in the final version of the film.)

=== Bootstrap Bill Turner ===
William "Bootstrap Bill" Turner Sr., portrayed by Stellan Skarsgård, is Will Turner's father and a crew member on Davy Jones' Flying Dutchman. He is mentioned in the first film, and he appears in Dead Man's Chest and At World's End. "Bootstrap Bill" Turner was the only member of Davy Jones' crew that was not created digitally. His appearance was achieved with prosthetics and makeup.

He was once a crewman on Black Pearl under Captain Jack Sparrow. When Sparrow's first mate, Hector Barbossa, led a mutiny against Sparrow, Bootstrap was the only one who did not participate. When the crew was later cursed by stealing Aztec gold, Bootstrap atoned for his failure to defend Sparrow by sending his coin to his young son William, so that he and the crew would not be able to find it and thus remain cursed forever. This act enraged Barbossa, and he punished Bootstrap by tying his bootstraps to a cannon and throwing him overboard. Due to the curse, Bootstrap could not die, and was forced to suffer constantly due to the lack of oxygen and crushing pressure on the seabed. Ten years later, sometime before the events of the first film, Bootstrap is found by Davy Jones, captain of the Flying Dutchman, and offered rescue from his fate in exchange for one hundred years working on his ship. Bootstrap agrees, and becomes subject to the curse of the Flying Dutchman. Because Jones has reneged on his promise to care for the souls of those who died at sea, he and his crew slowly transform into sea creatures. He first appears onscreen in Dead Man's Chest, where he is sent to remind Sparrow of his debt to Jones.

Bootstrap is eventually reunited with his son on board the Flying Dutchman, where Bootstrap is given the task of whipping Will. Despite the flogging, Bootstrap and Will bond, albeit rather uneasily, and Bootstrap eventually aids Will in stealing the key to the Dead Man's Chest from a sleeping Jones. This comes at the cost of surrendering his soul to Jones for eternity during a game of Liar's dice. Despite Bootstrap admitting that he had abandoned him at an early age and does not deserve salvation, Will promises to free his father from Jones. However, Jones discovers this and punishes Bootstrap by forcing him to watch the Kraken destroy Edinburgh Trader, the ship which is harbouring Will. Following the devastation, Jones orders Bootstrap to be locked in the brig. Bootstrap believes that Will perished on the ship. While in the brig, due to grief and the effects of the Flying Dutchman's curse, Bootstrap begins to lose his humanity and to be absorbed into the ship's hull, and becomes delusional. In At World's End, Elizabeth Swann is locked in the same brig as Bootstrap. She tells him that Will survived and that he will come to save him. Bootstrap forgets their conversation completely immediately. Later, when Admiral James Norrington helps Elizabeth and the other prisoners escape, Bootstrap alerts the other crewmen. In his delusion, Bootstrap kills Norrington. This apparently wins him Jones's trust, as Jones does not order him to be imprisoned again.

In the final battle against Jones and Cutler Beckett, Bootstrap, still delusional, fights Will without recognizing him. He is subdued by Will, and only recognises his son after seeing Jones stab him. In a fit of rage, Bootstrap attacks Jones, allowing Will to kill him. With their captain gone, Bootstrap and the other crewmen cut out Will's heart and place it in the Dead Man's Chest, making him the new captain of Flying Dutchman. Following the battle's end, Will offers his father the chance to leave the ship and live a normal life, but Bootstrap, desiring to make up for having abandoned Will when he was a boy, chooses to stay with his son aboard Flying Dutchman.

Following the birth of Henry Turner, Bootstrap Bill becomes a grandfather; therefore, also becoming the father-in-law of Elizabeth. However, he no longer appears to be aboard the ship in Dead Men Tell No Tales.

=== Davy Jones ===
Davy Jones, portrayed by Bill Nighy, appears in both Dead Man's Chest and At World's End, with a cameo in Dead Men Tell No Tales. He was once an ordinary man, a great sailor and a mortal Scottish pirate, who fell in love with the sea goddess Calypso, who charged Jones with the task to ferry the souls who died at sea to the next world as captain of the Flying Dutchman, and could only step on land once every ten years. But when Jones came ashore, he was betrayed by Calypso, and as a result, Jones plotted with the first Brethren Court to trap the goddess in human form. He also ripped out his still-beating heart from his body, and locked it away in the Dead Man's Chest. Soon afterwards, Davy Jones transformed from a man into a monster with the curse of the Flying Dutchman, which also affected the crew who were press-ganged and ultimately became a part of the ship itself, losing all humanity.

In Dead Man's Chest, Jones seeks Jack Sparrow's life. Thirteen years previously he had raised Black Pearl from the depths of the ocean in return for a future guarantee of Jack's service aboard Flying Dutchman. Jones offers to let Sparrow out of the deal if he can find one hundred souls to replace him within three days. Will steals the key to the Dead Man's Chest, and the heart of Davy Jones eventually lands in the possession of Lord Beckett. Jones orders the Kraken to kill Jack Sparrow, and he is dragged to Davy Jones's Locker.

In At World's End, Beckett uses the heart to force Jones to serve him. Jones kills his Kraken and obliterates the ships of several pirates. He confronts Tia Dalma while she is locked in the brig of Black Pearl. She briefly removes his curse and promises to love him forever when she is freed from her human form. Jones also professes his love for her. After Calypso is freed and she learns of Jones's role in her capture, she refuses to help either the pirates or Jones. Her fury creates a giant maelstrom, in which the crews of Flying Dutchman and Black Pearl battle. Jones wounds Will Turner, who, despite being fatally injured, manages to stab the heart with the aid of Jack Sparrow, thus becoming the new captain. As Jones tumbles from the side of the ship to his death, he calls out for Calypso.

Despite the death of Davy Jones in At World's End, actor Bill Nighy expressed interest in returning for the fourth installment. "I am technically dead but then again, who cares? Everybody dies in the pirates movies. They killed Johnny [Depp] and Geoffrey [Rush]. Death is not permanent in the pirate world. I have a serious desire to come back." While he does not appear in On Stranger Tides, Jones makes a cameo in a post-credits scene for Dead Men Tell No Tales. Will Turner and Elizabeth Swann are asleep when their bedroom is entered by the shadow of an apparently resurrected Davy Jones. Will then awakens and, assuming that he was simply dreaming, goes back to sleep. The camera then pans to the floor, revealing a puddle of water and barnacles. Although the post-credits scene of Dead Men Tell No Tales featured Will Turner having a dream of Davy Jones seemingly resurrected from the dead, directors Joachim Rønning and Espen Sandberg confirmed the scene was meant to "pay respect to a legendary villain in the franchise" as well as be a tease or hint that it could be the "beginning of the end" or "just a dream or nightmare".

=== Cutler Beckett ===
Fictional flag of the East India Trading Company, flown from the stern of Cutler Beckett's flagship, the Endeavour.

Lord Cutler Beckett (usually just Lord Beckett) portrayed by Tom Hollander, appears in Dead Man's Chest and At World's End. A ruthless mastermind, Beckett is the chairman of the East India Trading Company and is dedicated to eliminating piracy around the world.

Beckett first appears in Dead Man's Chest, when he arrives in Port Royal with warrants of arrest for Will Turner and Elizabeth Swann (for aiding in the escape of Jack Sparrow), and also for James Norrington (for giving Jack a head start when he escaped), although Norrington had already resigned his commission and disappeared months before. Beckett offers Will a deal, informing him that he and Elizabeth will be pardoned if Will locates Jack Sparrow and brings back his compass for Beckett to use. Beckett wants to use the compass to find the Dead Man's Chest and the heart of Davy Jones within it, to take control of Jones and the Flying Dutchman to purge the seas of pirates (and any other business competition).

Shortly after Will departs, Governor Swann tries to help Elizabeth escape from captivity by arranging for a ship to take her back to England. But before they can go through with it, Beckett catches wind of the plan, and orders his assistant, Ian Mercer, to kill the captain of the ship and arrest Governor Swann and Elizabeth. However, Elizabeth manages to escape before she can be recaptured. She confronts Beckett in his office and holds a pistol to his head, forcing him to sign and validate his Letters of Marque, so she can use them to free Will. Before she leaves, Beckett warns her that, even with her actions, the full pardon is not free – he will still want the compass.

Beckett later learns from Mercer that Elizabeth had made her way to Tortuga and left on board the Black Pearl with Jack Sparrow. Beckett uses this information to blackmail Governor Swann, telling him that EITC ships are in pursuit of the Pearl, and that Elizabeth will be spared from being slaughtered with the other pirates only if Governor Swann agrees to follow Beckett's orders. Governor Swann reluctantly agrees.

At the end of the film, Norrington arrives in Beckett's office with the Letters of Marque, and offers him the heart of Davy Jones in exchange for his old life. Beckett subsequently promotes Norrington to the position of Admiral in the EITC. With Jones' heart now in his possession, Beckett now has full control over Jones and the Flying Dutchman.

In At World's End, Beckett has been appointed representative of George II. Beckett's ambitions now turn to discovering the Brethren Court and eliminating it, thus rendering pirates worldwide leaderless, allowing Beckett to destroy them in one swoop. At a mass hanging of people convicted of piracy or association with pirates, the prisoners start singing Hoist the Colours, a signal for the Brethren to assemble, as planned by Beckett.

Meanwhile, the Flying Dutchman (now under EITC control), is destroying pirate ships mercilessly and leaving none alive. This annoys Beckett, who needs prisoners to interrogate. He places Admiral Norrington on board the Dutchman with the Dead Man's Chest, with marines pointing bayonets at the heart at all times, forcing Jones to obey Beckett's commands more precisely. At one point, Beckett ordered Jones to kill the Kraken. Beckett later orders Governor Swann assassinated, as he has found out too much about the heart.

Later, Beckett acquires the Black Pearl with the help of Sao Feng, whom he falsely promised he would give the ship to. Jack Sparrow is brought on board the EITC flagship, the Endeavour, where he and Beckett make a deal: if Jack leads Beckett to Shipwreck Cove and convinces the pirates to come outside, Beckett will guarantee Jack's freedom and not hand him over to Davy Jones. However, Jack manages to escape back over to the Black Pearl, but not before destroying one of the Endeavour's masts, preventing Beckett from immediately following Jack.

After finding Will Turner adrift at sea, Beckett, Will, and Jones sail to Shipwreck Cove using Jack's compass. They arrive with an armada consisting of hundreds of EITC ships, and find that the Pirate Lords have agreed to go to war at Jack's urging. During a parley with Elizabeth, Barbossa, and Jack, Beckett calls Jack out as the one who betrayed the pirates to him. Elizabeth gives Jack to Beckett and Jones in exchange for Will's release; however, Jack had planned for this to happen.

Following the battle of Calypso's maelstrom, only the Black Pearl emerges from the abyss. Worried that his advantage is lost with the Flying Dutchman apparently gone, Beckett orders the Endeavour to move forward and attack the Pearl. However, the Dutchman resurfaces from the sea, no longer under Beckett's control, as Will had stabbed Jones' heart and become the ship's new captain. Both the Pearl and the Dutchman flank the Endeavour and open fire, tearing the ship apart. Paralysed with shock and fear, Beckett is unable to give any orders, resulting in the crew abandoning ship while he remains on board. After Beckett descends the deck stairs, the powder magazine of the Endeavour explodes, killing him and completely destroying the ship. Following his death, the EITC armada retreats in demoralised defeat.

Cutler Beckett was also going to appear in Dead Men Tell No Tales, as he appeared in the early draft by Terry Rossio.

Beckett has been referred to by W. Wesley Pue as an allegory for restrictions on personal liberty as a result of the war on terror.

=== Sao Feng ===
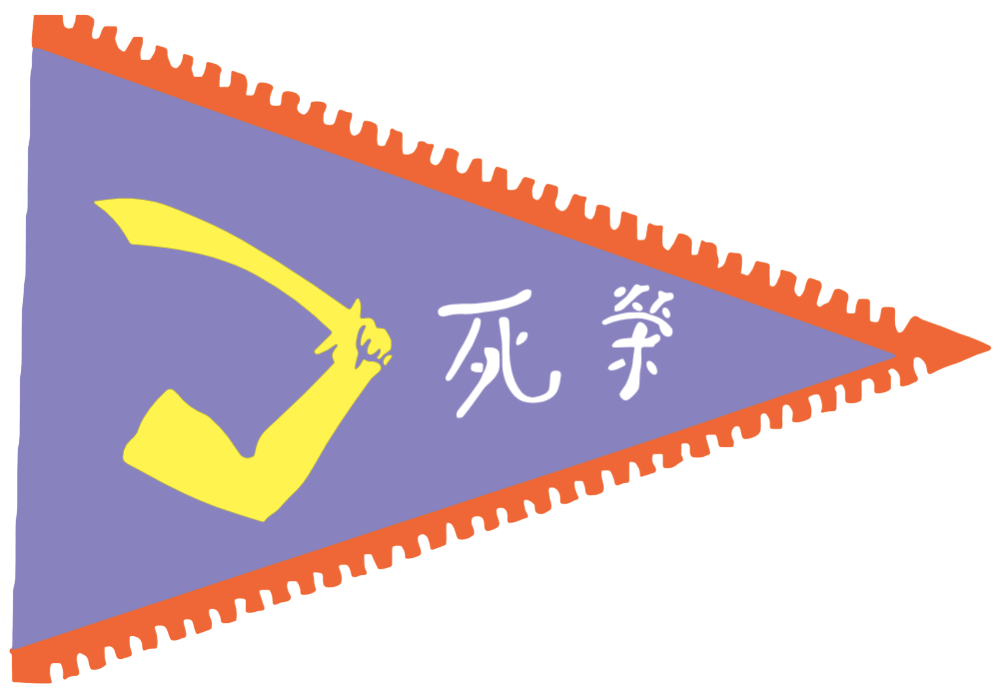
One of Sao Feng's pirate flags.

One of Sao Feng's pirate flags, seen being raised on one of the Empress' masts prior to the Battle of Calypso's Maelstrom. Also the flag of Ned Low.

Sao Feng
- Traditional Chinese: 嘯風
- Simplified Chinese: 啸风
- Literal meaning: Howling Wind
Transcriptions
Standard Mandarin
- Hanyu Pinyin: Xiào Fēng
- Wade–Giles: Hsiao^{4}-feng^{1}
- Yale Romanization: Syàu Fēng
- IPA: [ɕjâʊfə́ŋ]
Yue: Cantonese
- Yale Romanization: Siu Fūng
- Jyutping: Siu3 Fung1
- IPA: [ɕīːu fʊ́ŋ]

Sao Feng is portrayed by Chow Yun-fat. Sao Feng is the pirate lord of the South China Sea and his character is based on the legendary Chinese pirate Cheung Po Tsai. He appears in At World's End. Feng is depicted as an unscrupulous pirate who will do anything to join with the winning side, which he considers to be "just good business".

In At World's End, Barbossa and Elizabeth intend to rescue Jack Sparrow from Davy Jones' Locker. They visit Feng at his bathhouse in Singapore, requesting a ship and a crew. Feng is suspicious and informs them that earlier that day, Will Turner attempted to steal the navigational charts to World's End. Barbossa and Elizabeth deny knowing Will, but when Feng threatens to kill him, Elizabeth reacts, confirming they are allies. Barbossa explains that the Brethren Court has been summoned to convene on Shipwreck Cove and Feng, being one of the nine Pirate Lords, is honor-bound to attend. Feng demands to know why they want to sail to the Locker. When Will admits they want to rescue Jack, Feng becomes enraged and declares that he would only resurrect Sparrow to kill him in person.

Feng, Elizabeth, and Barbossa are interrupted by the East India Trading Company, led by Mr. Mercer. During the battle, Feng and Will confront each other while Mercer secretly listens in. Will tells Feng that if he wishes to make a deal with the EITC then he needs what Will offers—the two strike a deal. Will wants Black Pearl to free his father from Davy Jones. In exchange, Feng can have Jack Sparrow to barter to the East India Trading Company for his own freedom. Feng agrees and provides Will with a ship and crew, then covers Will and the others' escape from Singapore. Unbeknownst to Will, however, Feng makes his own deal with the East India Trading Company to turn over all the pirates, including Will, in exchange for Black Pearl and his own freedom.

After Jack and Black Pearl are rescued, Will leads them to an island where he and Feng arranged to meet. Jack, Barbossa and the crew are taken captive when Feng arrives in Empress. After a brief confrontation between the parties, Feng directs Sparrow's attention to Lord Cutler Beckett's approaching ship, Endeavour. Feng hands over Sparrow and the crew to the East India Trading Company, but learns Beckett is keeping Black Pearl. Barbossa then sways Feng to their side by revealing that he intends to release Calypso from her human form. Feng, mistaking Elizabeth for Calypso, aids their escape in exchange for her.

In his quarters, Feng reveals that he believes Elizabeth is Calypso (unaware that Tia Dalma is really Calypso, not Elizabeth). He tells Elizabeth it was the first Brethren Court who imprisoned the sea goddess, Calypso, in human form. Elizabeth pretends to be Calypso, and discusses with Feng what she might do for him if freed. When she asks what would happen if she refused to grant her favors, he suggests he would take them by force. He then forcefully kisses her, but she pushes him away. While angrily approaching her once more, he is caught by cannon fire as Flying Dutchman suddenly attacks. When the smoke clears Elizabeth finds Feng under a small pile of rubble, impaled with a huge piece of drift wood. Dying, Feng pronounces Elizabeth the captain of Empress, and gives her his "piece of eight", a jade stone on a necklace, telling her that she must take his place at the Brethren Court. Elizabeth becomes the Pirate Lord of the South China Sea. His last words are, "Forgive me, Calypso."

=== Angelica ===
Angelica, portrayed by Penélope Cruz in Pirates of the Caribbean: On Stranger Tides, is a former love interest of Jack Sparrow and the daughter of Edward Teach / Blackbeard. The character's full name was never revealed in On Stranger Tides onscreen or in any related promotional material. According to screenwriter Terry Rossio, Angelica for many years went by her mother's maiden name, which is "Rivera". By 2017, the name "Angelica Teach" was used in Captain Jack's – Restaurant des Pirates in Disneyland Paris. Sometime in the past, Jack Sparrow first met Angelica just before she was to take a vow of celibacy in a Spanish convent; she later blames Jack for her corruption, although Jack counters this argument citing that she was 'hardly innocent' to begin with. Angelica later reunites with Blackbeard and becomes the first mate aboard the Queen Anne's Revenge. At some point prior to the events of Dead Man's Chest, Angelica trades a ring given to her by Jack to the mystic Tia Dalma for information about the Profane Ritual used for the Fountain of Youth; Jack steals the ring from Tia Dalma's shack in Dead Man's Chest. Prior to the events of On Stranger Tides, when Philip Swift was captured from aboard his ship in a raid, Angelica saves the young missionary from being killed by Blackbeard, believing the missionary would help save the fearsome pirate's soul. In addition, both Angelica and Blackbeard also heard that Jack Sparrow knew the Fountain of Youth's location, and so she recruited a crew in London disguised as Sparrow, in a plot that would lead Sparrow to find her.

During the quest for the Fountain of Youth, Angelica reunited with Jack Sparrow in London before shanghaiing him aboard the Queen Anne's Revenge, in an attempt to discover the location of Fountain to avoid Blackbeard's prophesied death by a one-legged man. Angelica tells Jack she is Blackbeard's long-lost daughter to get Jack to believe she is conning Blackbeard; it is later revealed that Angelica was telling the truth and that she is Blackbeard's daughter after all. Although Jack devised a mutiny aboard the Revenge, Angelica fought against his mutineers before Blackbeard used his sword to single-handedly quell Sparrow's attempted mutiny, and witnessed Blackbeard's usage of a voodoo doll to bend Sparrow to his will. Despite this, Angelica danced with Jack aboard the Revenge and offered the Black Pearl as a in return for helping them find the Fountain. Angelica also helped Blackbeard in a mermaid hunt and later orchestrated the gathering of a mermaid's tear. However, Blackbeard also threatens Angelica's life, holding his daughter at gunpoint, to get Jack Sparrow to retrieve the Chalices of Ponce de Leon.

After the battle at the Fountain of Youth, a battle ensues between Blackbeard and Barbossa while Angelica, Scrum, and Jack fight over the mermaid's tear and the chalices. After Barbossa stabs Blackbeard with a poisoned sword, Angelica unintentionally poisoned herself while trying to remove Barbossa's poison-laced sword from Blackbeard's chest, Jack tricks Blackbeard into sacrificing his life to save Angelica's. Although Blackbeard had intended to kill Angelica so he could survive, Angelica holds Jack responsible for her father's death. Knowing that she will try to avenge her father, Jack then maroons her on a small desert island named Sola Fide Beach and gives her a pistol loaded with one shot. Seeing that he still loves her, Angelica tries to convince Jack not to leave her on the island by claiming she has knowledge of several artifacts that can give him control of the ocean and that she is pregnant with his child, but he does not fall for either of her ruses. It is then Angelica finally admits her love for Jack, who is somewhat touched by this; however, he still leaves. Angered, Angelica then uses the sole round from her pistol in an attempt to kill Jack as he rows away, but misses. In a post-credits scene, Angelica finds Blackbeard's voodoo doll made in Jack's image and smiles, hoping that she will finally get her revenge on Jack.

=== Blackbeard ===
Blackbeard, portrayed by Ian McShane, appears in Pirates of the Caribbean: On Stranger Tides, and in the 2011 revamp of the original attraction.

Based on the historical figure and notorious pirate of the same name, Blackbeard originally appeared in "The Buccaneer's Heart" comic, where Will Turner and Jack Sparrow release the ghostly spirits of the Caribbean's most notorious swashbucklers, from Disney Adventures magazine in 2004. A still-living Blackbeard ended up being developed as a key story element retained from the novel On Stranger Tides by Tim Powers, from which the fourth film drew inspiration. Among the references to the book, Blackbeard is a brujo. The history prior to On Stranger Tides is also slightly different from real-world history, with Blackbeard's history being considered legend. Blackbeard is still alive by 1750, though the story about his death at the battle of Ocracoke Inlet in 1718 is still well known in the Caribbean. As stated by Jack Sparrow, people believe that Blackbeard was beheaded, and that his headless body swam three times around his ship before climbing back on board.

Said by Jack to be "the one pirate all pirates fear", Blackbeard practices voodoo and uses the power embedded in the Sword of Triton to rule his ship, the Queen Anne's Revenge. With the exception of his daughter Angelica, Blackbeard zombified his entire staff of officers to ensure their loyalty, resurrected those he has killed into his service. Because of a prophecy that Blackbeard will be killed by a one-legged man, foretold by his zombie quartermaster, Blackbeard wants to find the Fountain of Youth. Before the events of On Stranger Tides, Blackbeard captures the missionary Philip Swift, who Angelica believes could save Blackbeard's soul. Blackbeard also attacks the Black Pearl, using his sword to turn its own rigging against Hector Barbossa's crew, forcing Barbossa to cut off his own leg to escape with his life, turning Barbossa into a mortal enemy vowed on revenge. Unbeknownst to Barbossa, Blackbeard captured the Black Pearl, magicking it into a ship in a glass bottle for good measure, along with an armada of other conquered ships.

During the quest for the Fountain of Youth, Angelica shanghaied Jack Sparrow aboard the Queen Anne's Revenge, in an attempt to discover the location of Fountain to avoid Blackbeard's prophesied death. Although Jack devised a mutiny, Blackbeard used his sword to bring the rigging of his ship alive to single-handedly quell Sparrow's attempted mutiny, then burned a scapegoat crew member alive with Greek fire to prove to Philip that faith and prayer are useless and helpless in the face of true evil, and so fashions a voodoo doll to bend Jack Sparrow to his will. Blackbeard also led a mermaid hunt, forcing a boatload of sailors out as 'bait' and captured the mermaid Syrena, orchestrating the gathering of a mermaid's tear. He also threatens Angelica's life, holding his daughter at gunpoint, to get Jack Sparrow to retrieve the Chalices of Ponce de Leon.

In the film's climax, Blackbeard and Barbossa duel at the Fountain of Youth. Barbossa stabs Blackbeard with a poison-laced sword, and Angelica accidentally cuts herself when trying to remove it from her father. As both Blackbeard and Angelica lie dying, Blackbeard asks his daughter to sacrifice herself to save him using a ritual at the Fountain, and Angelica willingly agrees. Jack Sparrow secretly switches the magical cups used in the ritual, thus sparing her life and killing Blackbeard. Barbossa claims Blackbeard's magical sword and, assuming command of the Queen Anne's Revenge, leaves with Blackbeard's crew. Meanwhile, Joshamee Gibbs snuck aboard, stole all of Blackbeard's ships in bottles and delivered them to Jack, who learned of the current state of the Black Pearl.

=== Armando Salazar ===
Captain Armando Salazar is an undead ghostly Spanish captain who commands the ghost ship Silent Mary. He appears in the fifth film, Dead Men Tell No Tales, and is portrayed by Javier Bardem.

Originally an officer in the Spanish Navy, Captain Salazar became a pirate hunter and sailed the seas killing pirates for many years, earning himself the nickname El Matador del Mar, meaning "The Butcher of the Sea" in Spanish. Young "Jack the Sparrow" tricked the pirate hunter to sail the Silent Mary in pursuit of the pirate ship Wicked Wench into the Devil's Triangle, where Salazar and his crew were killed. However, through the dark powers of the Triangle, Salazar's crew were resurrected as undead ghosts.

Decades later, when Sparrow gives away his magical compass, the betrayed compass retaliates by releasing Salazar and his crew from the Devil's Triangle. He begins hunting pirate ships and destroys several ships of Hector Barbossa's fleet. Barbossa, now in possession of the compass, agrees to lead Salazar to Jack in return for amnesty for his ships. Salazar corners Jack on an island, but he is unable to set foot on land due to his curse. Barbossa goes ashore, but double-crosses Salazar and flees with Jack to search for the Trident of Poseidon.

As Sparrow and Barbossa flee to the Trident's island, Salazar gives chase. He captures Henry Turner while the others reach land. Salazar possesses Henry, which allows him to walk on the dry land where the Trident is located. Once he takes hold of the Trident, he frees himself from Henry and fights Jack. Before Salazar can deliver the final blow to Jack, Henry destroys the Trident, which breaks all curses at sea, and makes Salazar and his crew mortal once again.

Barbossa drops the anchor from Black Pearl to save Jack, Henry, and Carina Smyth. As Sparrow, Carina and Henry climb to safety, a still-vengeful Salazar pursues them. Hector Barbossa sacrifices himself to save his daughter Carina and knocks Salazar off the anchor chain by stabbing him in the back. Salazar plummets and he hits his head on the anchor, which kills him for good. The rest of Silent Mary's crew and Barbossa drown as the walls of water close in.

=== Henry Turner ===
Henry Turner, portrayed by Brenton Thwaites, is the son of Will Turner and Elizabeth Swann and the grandson of Weatherby Swann and Bootstrap Bill Turner. Dominic Scott Kay, credited as "Young Will Turner", played a younger Henry in the post-credits of At World's End, while Lewis McGowan portrays 12-year-old Henry in Dead Men Tell No Tales. Henry tries to reconnect with his father but struggles to break a curse that is preventing him from doing so. He later enlists in the Royal Navy to gain more information in search of the Trident of Poseidon to break the curse on his father on Flying Dutchman. He ends up the last survivor of the ship after Captain Salazar's crew kills everyone on board and relays the message to Jack Sparrow from Captain Salazar. He later joins Jack Sparrow and Carina Smyth to find the Trident of Poseidon. At the end of the film he begins a romance with Carina and is reunited with his father, who was freed because of Henry breaking his curse.

=== Carina Smyth ===
Carina Smyth (later Carina Barbossa) is portrayed by Kaya Scodelario ("Smyth" was, most probably, her late mother's maiden name). Left at an orphanage as a child, she uses the diary her father left her to search for the Trident of Poseidon. She is interested in science, particularly horology and astronomy.

She is arrested for witchcraft in St. Martin and sentenced to be executed; but, with the help of Henry Turner, she and Jack Sparrow escape. Pursued by Captain Salazar, she teams up with the crew and Captain Barbossa to find the Trident, using her diary and a ruby attached to its cover to locate its hiding place. After Salazar becomes mortal, he still pursues Jack, Carina and Henry; Barbossa sacrifices himself to kill Salazar, revealing that he is Carina's father and that he loves her. At the end of the film, she begins a romance with Henry and decides to change her last name to "Barbossa".

Carina is also the subject of a Dead Men Tell No Tales prequel novel, The Brightest Star in the North: The Adventures of Carina Smyth.

== Supporting characters ==
=== Tia Dalma ===
Tia Dalma, portrayed by Naomie Harris, appears in Dead Man's Chest and At World's End.

Before the events of the films, Davy Jones, a human, fell in love with the sea goddess Calypso. She gave him the task of guiding the spirits of the dead lost at sea to the next world. Jones was granted immortality on the condition that he could return to shore once every ten years. However, when Jones returned to shore after ten years of service, Calypso failed to appear. Feeling betrayed, Davy Jones made a secret agreement with the Pirate Lords, which resulted in Calypso being bound into a human body. She took the name Tia Dalma and began to practice Voodoo and Obeah magic.

It is implied that Tia Dalma and Sparrow became lovers at some point during the latter's adult life.

In Dead Man's Chest, Jack trades Barbossa's undead monkey for a jar of dirt from Tia Dalma, who tells him that it will protect him from Jones. Jack's crew returns to Tia Dalma's shack after Jack is dragged to Davy Jones's Locker by the Kraken. She reveals that she has resurrected Barbossa, who will help lead a mission to rescue Jack from the Locker.

In At World's End, Tia Dalma joins Barbossa, Will, Elizabeth, and the rest of the Black Pearl's crew as they travel to Singapore. There, they infiltrate Sao Feng's headquarters to acquire the navigational chart needed to sail to World's End and Davy Jones' Locker. When the group rescues Jack, she flirts with him and reminisces about their romantic relationship. As the group searches for an escape route back to the mortal world, they encounter numerous souls adrift in the water. Tia Dalma tells the group the story of Davy Jones and Calypso, but does not reveal her identity.

Later, it is revealed that Tia Dalma is actually Calypso. Her true motives for resurrecting Barbossa and Jack are unveiled when it is learned that both are Pirate Lords of the Brethren Court. Each has their respective "Pieces of Eight", the totems necessary to free Calypso. She resurrected Barbossa to obtain his Piece, and rescued Jack because his Piece went with him to Davy Jones' Locker. Upon arrival at Shipwreck Cove, she reminds Barbossa of her power by gripping his hand and temporarily rendering it skeletal. She warns him that it was only by her power that he is alive again and that he must fulfill their agreement to release her. If he fails, she will kill him.

Calypso and Davy Jones briefly reunite while she is locked in the brig of the ship. Calypso says she still feels deeply for Jones. She responds to his anger by saying that Jones never would have loved her if not for her uncontrollable and unpredictable nature. She chastises him for abandoning his duty to ferry souls to the other world. Calypso is also furious that the Pirate Lords trapped her in her human form. Thus, her true motives are revealed: she plans to use her powers against the current court in revenge for the original act of turning her into a human. She will also fully give her love to Jones, and they reconcile. When she touches Jones, he momentarily transforms back into the man he once was.

Barbossa and Ragetti release Calypso from her human form. Before Calypso is fully freed, Will tells her that it was Davy Jones who betrayed her by revealing to the first Brethren Court how to bind her into her human form. Bound by ropes, she grows to nearly sixty feet high, towering over the crew. Barbossa asks that she fulfill their agreement and use her powers to aid the pirates. Calypso breaks free, transforming herself into thousands of small crabs that engulf the ship and flee into the sea. Angry at both the Pirate Lords and Jones, she refuses to help either side. Her fury creates a violent maelstrom that becomes the battlefield between the Black Pearl and the Flying Dutchman.

While Calypso does not appear, Tia Dalma is referenced in On Stranger Tides. In Ted Elliott and Terry Rossio's screenplay of On Stranger Tides, Jack Sparrow has a ring pilfered from Tia Dalma's shack in Dead Man's Chest, which he gives to Angelica, who said she had to trade it to learn the "rules of the Fountain" known as the profane ritual. Later, as Jack and Angelica discuss the ritual, the latter grabs a snake and wields it at Jack before saying, (a la Tia Dalma) "All da years dat dey have lived, and they could have lived, if fate'd been kinder." Although Tia Dalma was not directly referenced in the final cut of the film, her backstory with Angelica would still be mentioned in other media, notably Pirates of the Caribbean: On Stranger Tides: The Visual Guide. Around the release of On Stranger Tides in 2011, Naomie Harris stated that she was asked to record some Tia Dalma lines that would be said in the film by Penélope Cruz, who portrayed Angelica.

=== Pintel and Ragetti ===
Pintel and Ragetti, respectively portrayed by Lee Arenberg and Mackenzie Crook, are two bumbling pirates and partners-in-crime who originally serve on Barbossa's cursed crew in The Curse of the Black Pearl, later joining Jack's crew in Dead Man's Chest, then serving under both captains in At World's End before serving under Barbossa again. As part of a backstory worked out by both Arenberg and Crook, their characters' full names are Abner Pintel and Terry Ragetti; they were uncle and nephew, and shared half a brain. Arenberg also said that Ragetti may have come to sea with Pintel after his father's death.

In the first film, Pintel and Ragetti serve aboard the Black Pearl as cursed pirates doomed to turn into skeletons under the moonlight. They were part of the crew who mutinied against Jack Sparrow before the events of the film. When the crew of the Pearl attack Port Royal, Pintel and Ragetti capture Elizabeth Swann, discovering she has the golden medallion they are searching for, and take her to Barbossa. Later, on Isla de Muerta, when the pirates learn that Elizabeth is not the original owner of the medallion, Pintel and Ragetti are the first two to be blamed for bringing the wrong person, until blame is quickly shifted to Barbossa. They play a part in the battle between the Pearl and the Interceptor, which results in the capture of all those on board, including Elizabeth, Jack Sparrow, and Will Turner, the owner of the medallion. This results in Jack and Elizabeth being stranded on a deserted island. On their way to Isla de Muerta, Pintel and Ragetti relay the story of Will's father, Bootstrap Bill Turner, to him. When they reach Isla de Muerta, the pirates soon learn that Jack has somehow escaped the island and gotten to Isla de Muerta, and makes a deal with Barbossa to attack the Dauntless rather than lift the curse immediately. Pintel and Ragetti are forced to distract the soldiers waiting outside the cave by dressing as women to lure their attention. When the pirates attack the Dauntless, Pintel and Ragetti join them, only for the curse to be lifted and for them to be captured by the Navy. A running gag in the movie is, whenever Pintel tries to murder a cast member (most notably Elizabeth), the person invokes parley so that Pintel is unable to kill him/her under pirate law. At first, despite Ragetti's objections, Pintel accepts the parley with Elizabeth, albeit reluctantly, but as time goes on, Pintel gets angrier when a parley is called upon by Jack Sparrow and after a later battle with the Interceptor, "If anyone so much as mentions the word 'parley', I'll have their guts for garters." Ironically, at the very end, when the now-mortal pirates lose the battle to the British troops, Pintel invokes "Parley" to confirm his surrender.

In the second film, Pintel and Ragetti have escaped from imprisonment, and are searching for the Black Pearl, now under the command of Jack Sparrow, so they can take it for themselves. They end up accidentally joining Jack's crew on the hunt for Davy Jones' Chest, and are whisked away to Tia Dalma's shack, where the crew learns that Davy Jones' heart is trapped inside the chest. Pintel and Ragetti then make their way to Isla Cruces with the rest of the crew to find the chest, where the others dig it up. When Jack and the others are distracted by infighting and the crew of Davy Jones' ship, the Flying Dutchman, Pintel and Ragetti steal the chest for themselves to make a profit. They are caught, however, by Elizabeth Swann, and all three of them work together to fend off the crew of the Dutchman. Unknown to them, the heart is no longer inside the chest, having been stolen earlier by Jack. Pintel, Ragetti, and the rest of the crew of the Pearl fight off the Kraken when Davy Jones summons it to the Pearl, and the two of them are among the few survivors of the Kraken's attack. As the Pearl sinks along with Jack, Pintel and Ragetti, along with Will Turner, Elizabeth, Mr. Gibbs, Cotton, and Marty, go back to Tia Dalma's shack where they are enlisted in a search and rescue mission to Davy Jones' Locker by Barbossa, their former captain.

In the third film, Pintel and Ragetti are with Gibbs, Cotton, and Marty in Singapore to smuggle weapons to Barbossa and Elizabeth in Sao Feng's bathhouse should they need them. They participate in the battle in Singapore against the East India Trading Company, and later join Barbossa's crew aboard the Hai Peng. The crew of the Hai Peng head to Davy Jones' Locker, where they rescue Jack and the Pearl. Jack, however, does not respond in kind, and refuses to allow Barbossa, Will, Elizabeth, Pintel, and Ragetti aboard the Pearl until Barbossa convinces him otherwise with the Navigational Charts, the only map that tells one how to leave the Locker. After arriving in the land of the living, Pintel and Ragetti are part of the search party to find water on Black Sand Beach, where the two of them muse about selling Kraken meat after finding the corpse of the Kraken on the sand. They are captured along with the rest of the crew by Sao Feng until Barbossa and Elizabeth make a deal with him to let them go, and they join Jack and Barbossa in Shipwreck Cove. Ragetti's wooden eye is revealed to be Barbossa's Piece of Eight, and he dons an eyepatch for the rest of the film after Barbossa takes it from him while gathering the Pieces of Eight from all nine Pirate Lords. It is Ragetti who completes the ritual necessary to release the goddess Calypso from her human form as Tia Dalma. He and Pintel participate in the Maelstrom battle against the Flying Dutchman and take part in the mutiny against Jack Sparrow at the end of the film, serving under Captain Barbossa once again.

Neither Pintel and Ragetti were seen again, though they were considered to appear in the fourth and fifth films. For On Stranger Tides, they were to be separated from each other, each thinking the other was dead until being reunited at the Fountain of Youth. They were also going to appear in Dead Men Tell No Tales, as they appeared in the early draft by Terry Rossio. There is also concept art which depicts Pintel and Ragetti in decadent gear similar to that worn by Captain Barbossa in the fifth film. However, Crook ultimately decided to not reprise his role as Ragetti to focus in his TV series Detectorists and Arenberg confirmed he was not joining the filming of Dead Men Tell No Tales in Australia. Their roles in the fifth film were largely filled by Murtogg and Mullroy.

In Disney Infinity, their names are Dock and Cover in the Pirates of the Caribbean Playset.

=== Cotton ===
Cotton, portrayed by David Bailie, is a mute pirate, having lost his tongue before the film series began. He appears in The Curse of the Black Pearl, Dead Man's Chest, and At World's End. Tales of the Code: Wedlocked, a short film and an immediate prequel to The Curse of the Black Pearl by James Ward Byrkit, Cotton had his first and last speaking line as it was implied that he lost his tongue to the pirate Mungard at Shipwreck City.

He was unable to speak, but he trained his blue-and-yellow macaw, voiced by Christopher S. Capp, to use a large number of phrases to essentially speak for him (such as 'Wind in the sails' apparently meaning 'Yes'), although nobody has been able to figure out how he did this. He is hired by Jack and Gibbs in The Curse of the Black Pearl to retrieve Black Pearl from Barbossa. He returns in the two sequels, loyally serving Jack. At the climax of the third film, he leaves Tortuga on Black Pearl, now commandeered by Barbossa. Cotton's parrot often serves as comic relief, along with Jack the Monkey.

Although Cotton does not appear in On Stranger Tides and Dead Men Tell No Tales, his parrot is seen trapped on Black Pearl, which was magically shrunk and imprisoned in a bottle by Blackbeard. Cotton himself was also going to appear in Dead Men Tell No Tales, as he appeared in the early draft by Terry Rossio.

=== Marty ===
Marty, portrayed by Martin Klebba, is a dwarf pirate hired by Jack and Gibbs to search for the Black Pearl in The Curse of the Black Pearl. He has only one line of dialogue in the first film, but he becomes more prominent in the second and third films as one of the main crew members. At the end of At World's End, he leaves with Barbossa on the stolen Black Pearl. Marty often provides comic relief, such as being blown off his feet after firing a blunderbuss in At World's End. He also appears in Dead Men Tell No Tales once again as Jack Sparrow's crew member.

=== Anamaria ===
Anamaria, portrayed by Zoe Saldaña, appears in The Curse of the Black Pearl. Terry Rossio confirmed that the name was chosen simply because "AnaMaria" is the middle name of his daughter. In the first screenplay draft, AnaMaria was a barmaid in the Faithful Bride, whom Jack encountered before meeting Joshamee Gibbs. Anamaria is a pirate who joins Joshamee Gibbs and Will Turner to get a chance to confront Jack Sparrow, who stole her boat, the Jolly Mon, prior to the events of the film. After Anamaria slaps Sparrow and accuses him of stealing her boat, Will intervenes and promises her Interceptor (the British Navy ship Jack had stolen to chase Black Pearl) in exchange for her cooperation on the journey. Reluctantly, Anamaria agrees and sails with Jack's crew to rescue Elizabeth Swann from Barbossa's crew. In the end, Anamaria allows Jack to captain Black Pearl.

Anamaria does not appear in any further films, and her final fate is unknown. According to Saldaña, when asked why she never appeared in any further films in the franchise, she commented that she almost quit acting due to an "elitist" business environment and disrespect from film crew.

=== Governor Weatherby Swann ===
Governor Weatherby Swann, portrayed by Jonathan Pryce, is the royal governor of Port Royal and the widowed father of Elizabeth Swann. In contrast to his strong-willed daughter, he is something of a milquetoast.

Both Elizabeth and the Governor sailed from England to the Caribbean eight years prior to Curse of the Black Pearl, along with James Norrington. Swann is a doting father, and he wishes for his daughter to accept Commodore Norrington's marriage proposal. However, he eventually comes to accept that she truly loves Will Turner.

In Dead Man's Chest, he opposed Will and Elizabeth's arrest by Lord Beckett. After Beckett frees Will so he can search for Jack Sparrow, Elizabeth escapes jail with help from her father. He is captured by Ian Mercer. Beckett informs Governor Swann that Elizabeth, if caught, will be saved and he himself will be freed as long as he gives good reports to England about Beckett's presence.

In At World's End, Weatherby Swann is forced to use his authority to allow Beckett to execute several pirates. In a deleted scene, Swann boards Flying Dutchman. Believing that his daughter died when the Kraken took Black Pearl, Weatherby attempts to stab the heart of Davy Jones. Admiral Norrington stops him, and Jones informs him that whoever stabs the heart must serve as the new captain of Flying Dutchman. Beckett and Ian Mercer inform Swann that his daughter is still alive, but Swann does not believe them. Swann then leaves, stating that he will no longer work for Beckett. Believing that Swann's knowledge of the heart is dangerous, Beckett orders him to be killed. He informs Norrington that Swann has returned to England.

Swann later appears as a ghost in Davy Jones' Locker, along with the souls of many others who have died at sea. He informs the crew of the Black Pearl that whoever kills Jones must take his place. He ignores Elizabeth's invitation to come aboard the Black Pearl (as he is beyond rescue now), saying he is proud of her and that he will give her love to her mother.

Posthumously, Swann becomes a grandfather after his daughter gives birth to Henry Turner as well as becoming the father-in-law of Will.

=== Murtogg and Mullroy ===
Murtogg and Mullroy, portrayed by Giles New and Angus Barnett, are two Royal Marines stationed in Port Royal. They serve as dull-minded characters, easily becoming distracted from their duties by getting into arguments, and are the 'civilized' equivalent of Pintel and Ragetti. Like their pirate counterparts, one is overweight, blustering, and dominant; the other is thin, semi-perceptive, and reticent.

In the first film, they are the guards of HMS Interceptor. Jack Sparrow distracts them into arguing about the Black Pearl, which allows him to steal the ship. Afterward, they serve on HMS Dauntless and survive the final battle.

They reappear in At World's End in service to the East India Trading Company. They are posted as the main guards of the Dead Man's Chest on the Flying Dutchman, but it is stolen by Jack during another argument. They later stow away on the Black Pearl, casting their lot with the pirates, and join Barbossa after the battle is over.

In On Stranger Tides, it was thought that they were on the Black Pearl when Blackbeard captured it and magically imprisoned it in a bottle. However, Murtogg and Mullroy return in Dead Men Tell No Tales, as part of Barbossa's crew; they inform Barbossa that his fleet of pirate ships is being destroyed by Silent Mary, Salazar's ship and crew. After Barbossa's death, they sail on the restored Black Pearl under the command of Jack Sparrow.

=== Jack the Monkey ===
Jack is Barbossa's pet capuchin monkey, named after Jack Sparrow to mock him. During The Curse of the Black Pearl, Jack is cursed with immortality, along with the rest of the crew. Jack temporarily becomes mortal again when Will lifts the curse, though he later steals another coin and becomes cursed again.

In Curse of the Black Pearl, Jack is portrayed by Tara, a ten-year-old female capuchin, and Levi, an eight-year-old male. The skeletal monkey was added in post-production by Industrial Light and Magic.

In Dead Man's Chest and At World's End, Jack is portrayed by Boo Boo, a twelve-year-old male and Mercedes, a ten-year-old female. During Dead Man's Chest, he resides on the Black Pearl. He is bartered to Tia Dalma, and later rejoins the resurrected Barbossa.

In At World's End, it is shown throughout the second and third films that the crew members of the Black Pearl, particularly Jack Sparrow, like to shoot at Jack. Jack steals several objects, such as Will's medallion and Ragetti's wooden eye, though their owners are able to retrieve them. Most of the crew is not partial to Jack, with the exception of Barbossa, to whom Jack is loyal. At one point, Pintel and Ragetti use Jack as a makeshift cannonball and he inadvertently saves Will Turner's life. Jack manages to escape the Flying Dutchman with Jack Sparrow and Elizabeth Swan as the ship sinks in Calypso's maelstrom.

In On Stranger Tides, Jack is trapped on the Black Pearl, which has been magically shrunk and confined to a bottle by Blackbeard. Jack Sparrow comments that the monkey is even more annoying that way.

In Dead Men Tell No Tales, Jack is freed from the bottle along with Black Pearl, reuniting with Barbossa shortly afterward. After Barbossa's death, Jack becomes loyal to Jack Sparrow, returning his compass as a gesture of peace. It is unclear if he remains undead or if Jack's curse was broken when the Trident of Poseidon was destroyed.

=== Philip Swift ===
Philip Swift, portrayed by Sam Claflin, is a missionary who appears in On Stranger Tides. After he was captured by Blackbeard, Philip's life was spared thanks to Angelica's belief that her father's soul can be saved. Along the journey to find the Fountain of Youth, Philip meets a beautiful mermaid and names her Syrena. They develop a close bond. Acting as Syrena's protector, he risks his own life for the mermaid, eventually falling in love with her. Blackbeard needs to retrieve Syrena's tears for a ritual at the Fountain of Youth, but she refuses to cry. Blackbeard uses Philip's love for Syrena to trick her into crying. After retrieving the tear, Blackbeard and his men leave Syrena tied up to die, while trying to bind Philip and bring him to the Fountain of Youth.

After being mortally wounded during the film's climactic battle, Philip returns to the Jungle Pools to free Syrena. Syrena returns to Philip, who begs Syrena for her forgiveness. She tells him that she can save his life, and kisses him; it is believed that a mermaid's kiss can save a man from drowning. Syrena pulls Philip under the water and swims away; his final fate is unknown. Philip was going to appear in Dead Men Tell No Tales, as he appeared in the early draft by Terry Rossio.

=== Syrena ===
Syrena, portrayed by Àstrid Bergès-Frisbey, is a mermaid who appears in On Stranger Tides. She does not appear to be as hostile as the other mermaids. Following the battle at Whitecap Bay, she is captured by Blackbeard's crew, who need a mermaid's tear to activate the Fountain of Youth. When the glass tank Syrena is being carried in shatters, she changes to a human form, causing missionary Philip Swift to remove his shirt and cover her. Philip then carries her due to her inability to walk and names her in an attempt to make Blackbeard realize she is a person and not a creature. Philip and Syrena develop a strong bond.

Syrena refuses to cry, even under the threat of torture. Blackbeard exploits her affection for Philip to obtain Syrena's tears of joy. Syrena is left to die, but a mortally wounded Philip returns to cut her loose. She gives the magical chalices necessary for the Fountain's ritual to Jack Sparrow, telling him not to waste her tear. Syrena returns to Philip, who begs Syrena for her forgiveness. She tells him that she can save his life, and kisses him; it is believed that a mermaid's kiss can save a man from drowning. Syrena pulls Philip under the water and swims away; her final fate is unknown. Syrena was going to appear in Dead Men Tell No Tales, as she appeared in the early draft by Terry Rossio.

=== Scrum ===
Scrum, portrayed by Stephen Graham, is a pirate who appears in On Stranger Tides and Dead Men Tell No Tales.

In the fourth film, Scrum assists Angelica in recruiting a crew while she is impersonating Jack Sparrow. He later sails on Queen Anne's Revenge under Blackbeard. At Whitecap Bay, he is almost killed by a mermaid. After Barbossa fatally wounds Blackbeard and commandeers Queen Anne's Revenge, Scrum joins his crew.

In the fifth film, Scrum serves under Jack Sparrow but deserts him with the rest of the crew after an unsuccessful bank robbery in Saint Martin. Scrum and his shipmates later save Sparrow, embarking on a quest to find the legendary Trident of Poseidon. When the pirates find out that Sparrow was chased by vengeful ghosts they raise a mutiny, electing Joshamee Gibbs as their new captain, who later tricks Scrum into becoming a captain himself shortly before they are captured. The pirates manage to escape, boarding the Black Pearl and later saving Sparrow, Carina Smyth, and Henry Turner from Captain Salazar and his crew of ghosts.

== Recurring characters ==
=== Prison Dog ===
The Prison Dog appears as a dog carrying the keys, serving as a reference to the dog that appears in the original Disneyland ride. In The Curse of the Black Pearl, the prison dog guards the Port Royal jail keys by carrying them in its mouth. In a clear reference to the original Disney ride, the prisoners vainly attempt to retrieve the keys from it with a bone. The dog appears again in Dead Man's Chest with Pintel and Ragetti after they have escaped prison and are headed for Pelegosto to search for Black Pearl. He was named "Poochie" by Pintel until he was left on Pelegosto. The dog is eventually left on Pelegosto, where the cannibal tribe chases after it, leaving Jack Sparrow to climb aboard the Black Pearl. In the post-credit scene of Dead Man's Chest it is revealed that the dog becomes the chief of the Pelegosto tribe. In At World's End, the dog reappears as the keeper of the Pirata Codex keys on Shipwreck Cove. Although Pintel and Ragetti were confused, Captain Teague explains the dog's presence by saying, "Sea turtles, mate," a reference to Jack Sparrow's tall tale of his own escape from being marooned. The DVD case for At World's End confirmed that the dog literally rode on the backs of sea turtles.

Twister is the prison dog in Pirates of the Caribbean: The Curse of the Black Pearl (2003), and was replaced by Chopper in the sequels Pirates of the Caribbean: Dead Man's Chest (2006) and Pirates of the Caribbean: At World's End (2007).

=== King George ===
King George Augustus/George II is portrayed by Richard Griffiths in the fourth film, On Stranger Tides. Before the events of the fourth film, the King of England was only mentioned in the original Pirates of the Caribbean trilogy. In Dead Man's Chest, despite being under the jurisdiction of the King's governor of Port Royal, Will Turner and Elizabeth Swann were arrested by Lord Cutler Beckett, who uses his position as duly to take control of Port Royal. Governor Swann was also caught sending a letter to the King by Beckett's aide, Mercer. Beckett carried Letters of Marque signed by King George, in which presents a full pardon, eventually taken by James Norrington. In At World's End, using his position as duly appointed representative of King, Lord Cutler Beckett declared a state of emergency, which he uses to combat piracy. King George II appears onscreen in the fourth film, named George Augustus onscreen, where he tries to recruit the infamous pirate Jack Sparrow guide an expedition to the Fountain of Youth. After Sparrow's escape, King George sends Hector Barbossa, now serving as a privateer in his court, to find the Fountain before the Spanish monarch King Ferdinand gains eternal life.

=== Lieutenant Gillette ===
Lieutenant Gillette, portrayed by Damian O'Hare, is second-in-command to Commodore Norrington stationed in Port Royal and the pride of the British Royal Navy, the HMS Dauntless. He is left aboard the Dauntless during Commodore Norrington's absence and loses the ship to Jack Sparrow, and later accompanies Norrington on Dauntless in pursuit of both the commandeered Interceptor and the pirate ship Black Pearl. After they rescue Elizabeth, the Dauntless sailed to Isla de Muerta, where she warns Lieutenant Gillette about the curse of the pirate crew aboard Black Pearl, but he refuses to believe her, saying "a little mermaid" flopped on deck and told the whole story. When the cursed pirates ambush the Dauntless, Gillette fights off the cursed pirates with the remainder of the crew before Commodore Norrington and his men arrive to reinforce the dwindling resistance against the pirates. Gillette is present after Jack Sparrow's escape from Fort Charles and when Norrington gives Sparrow "one day's head start" aboard the Black Pearl. It was at first believed that Gillette perished during Norrington's ill-fated pursuit of Jack Sparrow between the events of The Curse of the Black Pearl and Dead Man's Chest, but Lieutenant Gillette returns unharmed in On Stranger Tides, with Lieutenant Commander Groves, serving under Captain Barbossa aboard HMS Providence during the quest for the Fountain of Youth. By the order of King George II, Lieutenant Gillette assists Barbossa in finding the Fountain before the Spanish do, witnessing a mermaid attack on the Providence as well as battling Blackbeard's crew at the Fountain. Gillette was killed during Barbossa's duel with Blackbeard by the infamous pirate's sword, with Barbossa discarding Gillette's body.

=== Theodore Groves ===
Lieutenant Commander Theodore Groves, portrayed by Greg Ellis, is an officer of the British Royal Navy. Groves first appears as an unnamed officer under Commodore Norrington's command in The Curse of the Black Pearl. He is present when Jack Sparrow steals Interceptor and notes Sparrow's cleverness, saying "That's got to be the best pirate I've ever seen", the opposite of Norrington's oft-stated opinion that Sparrow is "without a doubt the worst pirate I have ever heard of".

Lieutenant Groves reappears in the third movie At World's End, first being present when pirates at the gallows sing "Hoist the Colours". He is appointed as Lord Cutler Beckett's second-in-command aboard HMS Endeavour. After Captain Jack Sparrow makes a daring escape from Cutler Beckett's grasp, Groves admiringly wonders if Jack plans everything out or just makes it up as he goes along, but is scared off by a glare from Beckett. During the final battle, he asks Cutler Beckett for orders as Endeavour was being pounded by Black Pearl's and Flying Dutchmann's cannon. Beckett remains in a state of shock during the entire battle, forcing Lieutenant Groves to order the crew to abandon ship.

Having been saved off-screen, Theodore Groves later resurfaces in the events of On Stranger Tides, and is promoted to lieutenant commander while working under Captain Barbossa aboard HMS Providence to find the Fountain of Youth before the Spanish do. He accompanies Barbossa on the shores of Whitecap Bay, only to be stranded there with the beach party as flesh-eating mermaids tear Providence apart along with its crew. He scolds Barbossa for not helping the crew as Providence is attacked but Barbossa warns him to remain silent. While Captain Jack Sparrow and Barbossa were held captive by the Spaniards, Lieutenant Commander Groves snuck through the Spanish picket lines (aided by a distraction Jack Sparrow made in a daring escape) and freed Barbossa from his bonds, although he lost his wig during the venture. He reached the Fountain of Youth with Barbossa and fought off Blackbeard's crew seeing his fellow officers and sailors being rapidly killed. The fight is stopped by the sudden arrival of the Spanish. Groves stood defiantly on top of the fountain claiming the Fountain for his king. The Spaniard, noting this, immediately shoots Groves, although noting his bravery. When the Spanish began destroying the Fountain of Youth, Groves' body was being carried away by two of his fellow officers.

=== Scarlett and Giselle ===
Scarlett and Giselle, respectively portrayed by Lauren Maher and Vanessa Branch, are two women who were in relationships with Jack Sparrow, appearing in The Curse of the Black Pearl, Dead Man's Chest, At World's End, and the short film Tales of the Code: Wedlocked. Scarlett is the redheaded wench, her name chosen based on the character in the original attraction, and Giselle is the blonde wench. According to Terry Rossio, Giselle's name was chosen to be a sort of classic-sounding Brit name that matched Scarlett.

In The Curse of the Black Pearl, when Jack Sparrow and Will Turner arrive at Tortuga, Jack is slapped by Scarlett and Giselle, the latter asking about the former before slapping the pirate's face. Wedlocked revealed that Scarlett and Giselle were engaged to Jack, who left them for a wench auction at Shipwreck City, but not before Scarlett sabotaged the Jolly Mon, explaining why the boat was sinking upon Jack's arrival at Port Royal. In Dead Man's Chest, Will asked Scarlett and Giselle for the whereabouts of Jack, who Scarlett hadn't seen in a month, and Giselle asks Will to give Jack a message before slapping him. Scarlett and Giselle are last seen at the end of At World's End, where the two women are looking forward to a ride Jack promised them on Black Pearl, only to find that Barbossa has stolen it. Jack reveals a series of declarations of truths that he lied to both wenches several times and on several levels, resulting in the Giselle and Scarlett each slapping Jack, who then slaps Joshamee Gibbs. Gibbs and Jack bid each other farewell before Gibbs heads off after Scarlett and Giselle.

=== Ian Mercer ===
Ian Mercer, portrayed by David Schofield, is Lord Beckett's facially scarred, loyal personal assistant in Dead Man's Chest and At World's End. Despite serving faithfully in his official capacity as a clerk, Mercer often executes Beckett's more sinister agendas as an assassin and spy.

When the Black Pearl is being taken over by the EITC, Mercer leads the boarding party. However, before they can even properly solidify control of the ship, the crew of the Black Pearl launch a counterattack, and Mercer ends up duelling Barbossa during the fighting. Once he sees that his marines are mostly beaten, Mercer jumps ship, and is presumably picked up by the Endeavour.

Sometime later, Mercer is placed aboard the Flying Dutchman. After Admiral James Norrington is killed, Mercer proclaims to Davy Jones that he is now in command of the ship, as he holds the key to the Dead Man's Chest in his possession.

During the maelstrom battle, Mercer is shielded by Jones from a cannon blast. However, the same blast also kills all the EITC marines around the helm, leaving Mercer defenseless. Jones takes advantage of the situation, and uses his tentacles to strangle Mercer and constrict his throat from the inside. Mercer falls to the deck, dead, as Jones takes the key to the Dead Man's Chest from around his neck.

=== Captain Bellamy ===
The ensign flown from the stern of the Edinburgh Trader, Captain Bellamy's ship.

Captain Bellamy is a Scottish merchant sailor and the captain of the Edinburgh Trader, who appears in Dead Man's Chest. He is portrayed by Alex Norton.

While Bellamy is docked in Port Royal, Elizabeth Swann takes the opportunity to sneak aboard the Edinburgh Trader disguised as a male member of Bellamy's crew, as she is trying to escape from Cutler Beckett. After her dress is discovered by another crew member, Bellamy suspects that there is a female stowaway on board, and orders his crew to search the ship.

Soon after, Bellamy is informed by his crew that Tortuga is the only free port left in the Caribbean (as the others have all been taken over by the East India Trading Company). Bellamy is initially reluctant to sail to a pirate port, but Elizabeth dangles her dress from the mast of the ship like a puppet, making it seem as though it is a spirit telling him to go to Tortuga, which he does.

Shortly after leaving Tortuga (where Elizabeth departs from the ship), Bellamy rescues Will Turner from the sea after the latter escapes from the Flying Dutchman with the key to the Dead Man's Chest. However, this incurs the wrath of Davy Jones, who sets the Kraken on the Edinburgh Trader. During the attack, Bellamy is hauled overboard by one of the Kraken's tentacles, dragged underwater and presumably eaten. After his death, his ship is completely destroyed and sunk by the beast. His surviving crew members are subsequently taken prisoner aboard the Dutchman, where they are executed on Jones' orders.

The Edinburgh Trader was portrayed by the Bounty.

=== Captain Teague ===
Captain Edward Teague, portrayed by Keith Richards, the Pirate Lord of Madagascar and Keeper of the Pirate Code. The character's full name was never revealed in the films onscreen or in any related promotional material. The name "Edward Teague" is likely based on real world pirate Edward Teach aka Blackbeard. According to screenwriter Terry Rossio, who did not believe Teague's name had ever been officially designated, he thought Teague's first name was "Robert", based on a historical pirate. Although Richards' role was rumored in 2004, and later reported in 2006, Teague was later confirmed to be Jack Sparrow's father. Teague appears in At World's End, On Stranger Tides, and Dead Men Tell No Tales.

In his first appearance in At World's End, Captain Teague serves as the Keeper of the Pirate Code, which is kept at Shipwreck Cove. He is also the master of the jailhouse dog, which was last seen in Dead Man's Chest being worshiped by the cannibals on Pelegesto. (It was later explained in Pirates of the Caribbean: The Price of Freedom that Teague was the original owner of the dog.) Teague explains the dog's apparent escape to Pintel and Ragetti by merely shrugging his shoulders and commenting, "Sea turtles, mate". During the fourth meeting of the Brethren Court, Teague guns down a pirate who dismisses the code. He subsequently informs the Court of the conditions required for a declaration of war and the necessary election of a Pirate King. Teague seems to be fond of his son, Jack; when Jack observes that he has survived a great deal, Teague observes that the trick is not living forever, but being able to live with oneself forever. When Jack asks about his mother, Teague shows him a shrunken head. Jack then comments, "She looks great!"

In the fourth film, after Jack escapes from King George II at St James's Palace, he is chased through the streets of London by the King's Royal Guard. Just as one of the soldiers aims his musket at Jack, he is shot in the back by Teague. Later, inside the Captain's Daughter pub, Teague gave Jack a significant amount of information about the Fountain of Youth. When Jack asked him, "Have you ever been there?", Teague sarcastically replied, "Does this face look like it's been to the Fountain of Youth?", Jack diplomatically commenting that it depends on the light. Teague then vanishes when Jack looks away.

In the fifth film, Dead Men Tell No Tales, Teague also appeared as a hallucination in an early draft by Terry Rossio. In the final version of the film, Teague briefly appears during a flashback explaining Jack's relationship to Captain Armando Salazar. In this scene, he is portrayed by Alexander Scheer.

=== The Spaniard ===
The Spaniard, portrayed by Óscar Jaenada, is King Ferdinand's most trusted agent. Introduced in On Stranger Tides, the Spaniard leads a force of 3 Spanish galleons to the Fountain of Youth to destroy it on the orders of King Ferdinand. Ferdinand believes the Fountain to be an abomination and a threat to the Catholic Church. His men find the silver Chalices of Juan Ponce de León on the wreck of his ship, though they are later stolen by Jack Sparrow. In the final battle at the Fountain, the Spaniard kills Theodore Groves, who tried to stop them by proclaiming the Fountain as the property of his King. The Spaniard claims that only God can grant immortality, not the Fountain. The Spaniard and his men leave after destroying the Fountain of Youth.

=== Lieutenant John Scarfield ===
John Scarfield appears in Dead Men Tell No Tales and was portrayed by David Wenham. Scarfield was a lieutenant of the Royal Navy.

After Carina Smyth and Jack Sparrow are captured in Saint Martin, Scarfield orders for both of them to be executed. Later, when Henry Turner washes up in the town, Scarfield declares him a deserter and orders for him to be hanged as well. However, Henry, Carina and Jack manage to escape, with Jack knocking Scarfield out in the process. The three of them flee aboard the Dying Gull.

Determined to recover the three fugitives, Scarfield seeks out the sea-witch Shansa, who shows him the route to the Trident of Poseidon, where Jack, Carina and Henry are headed. Scarfield decides to acquire the Trident to ensure he will have control over the ocean.

On board his ship, the Essex, Scarfield eventually catches up with the Dying Gull, only to find that Jack, Carina and Henry are no longer on board. Nonetheless, he orders his men to viciously beat Scrum (who was the ship's captain at the time) for information on where the fugitives are headed. He then orders the rest of the pirates locked in the brig of the Essex, though they later manage to escape.

Later that night, Scarfield and the Essex intercept the Black Pearl, which Jack, Carina and Henry are now aboard, still looking for the Trident. Declaring that only he will wield the power of the sea, Scarfield orders his crew to prepare to fire on the Pearl. However, before they can even get a chance, the Silent Mary emerges from behind the Essex and slices through it, destroying the ship and killing Scarfield.

== See also ==
- List of Pirates of the Caribbean cast members
