= Hector Barbossa =

Fictional character in the Pirates of the Caribbean film series

- Pirates of the Caribbean character
- Geoffrey Rush as Hector Barbossa (Note: Promotional image for Pirates of the Caribbean: At World's End (2007))
- First appearance: Pirates of the Caribbean: The Curse of the Black Pearl (2003)
- Portrayed by: Geoffrey Rush
- Voiced by: Brian George (Kingdom Hearts II, video game, etc); Richard McGonagle (Pirates of the Caribbean: Dead Man's Chest video game)

In-universe information
- Occupation: Pirate Captain; Pirate Lord of the Caspian Sea; Formerly: First Mate; Privateer
- Family: Carina Smyth (daughter)
- Nationality: English (West country)

Captain Hector Barbossa is a fictional character of the Pirates of the Caribbean franchise, depicted by Geoffrey Rush and appearing in all five films in the series. Barbossa debuted in The Curse of the Black Pearl (2003) as the main antagonist, being the captain of the Black Pearl. In subsequent films, he has appeared in an anti-heroic role.

Captain Barbossa has only a brief cameo appearance in Pirates of the Caribbean: Dead Man's Chest (2006). He returns as one of the nine Pirate Lords in At World's End (2007), then in On Stranger Tides (2011) he serves as a privateer under King George II and the Royal Navy while pursuing a vendetta against Blackbeard. In Dead Men Tell No Tales (2017), he is depicted as a wealthy and powerful pirate leader commanding a large fleet.

Throughout the series, Barbossa has been conceptualized as a "dark trickster" and the evil counterpart of Captain Jack Sparrow. The character is loosely based on Ottoman admiral Hayreddin Barbarossa. He has received a highly positive reception from critics, with praise towards Rush's performance and his interesting rivalry and friendship with Jack.

== Background and development ==
Originally, Rush was second choice for the role behind Robert De Niro, who turned it down as he expected the film to flop like previous pirate films did; he regretted this decision later, and accepted the role of Captain Shakespeare in the movie Stardust.

Johnny Depp proposed the character's first name "Hector" on set of the first film, although it is never mentioned in the film, but rather only in the DVD commentary. Writers Ted Elliott and Terry Rossio originally thought it was fan-made when they saw it on the Internet, and decided to use it nonetheless.

While in the first film, Barbossa was conceptualized only as a classic Disney villain, actor Geoffrey Rush felt that he was playing the unsung hero of the film, who only dreamed about lifting the curse and living as a rich rogue with his prized pirate bride. Rush expressed fondness with the potential and development of his character, who evolved throughout the series and ventured into different terrains every film, which kept him challenged as an actor. This included acting as a 'pirate politician' hosting a "G20 summit of pirate lords" in the third film, and in the fourth film as a fully legitimized privateer working for England's king. By the fifth installment, Barbossa has become what Rush refers to as a "corporate pirate" managing immense influence and wealth for his fleet.

Rush has expressed that he considers the ending of the fifth Pirates film to be a "nice and final conclusion" to Barbossa's journey of redemption. Due to this, Rush stated that he cannot see himself portraying the character in a potential sequel again, with perhaps the exception of a short cameo as a ghost "annoying Jack Sparrow with his wisdom."

== Fictional character biography ==
=== Before the films ===
Information concerning Barbossa's childhood and youth stem from actor Geoffrey Rush, who devised a backstory for the character in order to portray him more convincingly. According to Rush, Barbossa was born to an impoverished Portuguese noblewoman by an unknown father and hailed from Lisbon in Portugal, though Jack Sparrow surmises a Cornish origin based upon his accent in The Price of Freedom. Longing to escape a life of poverty, he ran away from home aged 13 to pursue life as a sailor. At first, Barbossa wanted to be an honest sailor with the merchant marine, but seeing the grandeur of the captains' cabins on the ships on which he served, he realized that a man from his station could never afford a lifestyle like that whilst remaining an honest sailor, choosing a life of piracy instead.

Nothing is known about his early exploits as a pirate prior to The Price of Freedom. In the novel, Barbossa, in his early 40s, is the captain of the pirate schooner Cobra. After plundering a French ivory barque, his ship is attacked and sunk by a crew of rogue pirates, and he is narrowly saved from drowning by his crew members Pintel and Ragetti. After managing to reach Tortuga, the then-Pirate Lord of the Caribbean brings them to Shipwreck Cove to report the incident to an assembly of pirates. A few months later, Jack Sparrow finds out that the attacker is Barbossa's old friend Boris Palachnik, the Pirate Lord of the Caspian Sea. The attackers are brought before a pirate court that summons Davy Jones, who confirms Palachnik's guilt. Visiting Palachnik in prison, Barbossa is unknowingly granted the title of Pirate Lord of the Caspian Sea, as Palachnik gives him his Piece of Eight and his ship. However, before Barbossa can claim his new vessel, the rogue pirates break out of prison and escape on his ship. After that, he is intent to join Captain Teague's hunting party and has his Piece of Eight carved into a wooden eye for his crew mate Ragetti.

At some point, after Jack Sparrow attains the Black Pearl, Hector Barbossa joins him as his first mate. The original backstory was that Jack recruited Barbossa and his cronies, including Pintel and Ragetti, prior to the voyage to Isla de Muerta. However, Hector Barbossa was first mate in the quest for the Shadow Gold in the Legends of the Brethren Court book series, where Tia Dalma tasks them with securing seven vials of shadow gold to stop the evil Shadow Lord from gaining total control over the seas by destroying the Brethren Court with his Shadow Army. Over the course of the novels, they are able to collect all vials shattered across the world by allying with or fighting against the other Pirate Lords. They are able to defeat the Shadow Lord with the combined efforts of all Pirate Lords, after which Jack wants to sail for Tortuga to recruit a new crew. Barbossa offers him to handle that in his stead, implying that he recruited men with the intent to mutiny against his captain.

Ten years before the events of The Curse of the Black Pearl, Barbossa was first mate aboard the Black Pearl prior to the mutiny against Jack Sparrow, having recruited a crew at Tortuga, notably Pintel and Ragetti. Sparrow told Barbossa and the rest of the crew about the curse, though nobody believed this ghost story. Captain and crew agreed to equal shares of the treasure, but devious first mate Barbossa persuaded Jack that equal shares included knowing the treasure's location. Jack complied, and soon after Barbossa led a mutiny and marooned Jack on an island with nothing but a pistol containing one shot. Jack hates Barbossa for having violated the code. Barbossa's crew finds the treasure, take every bit of the gold, including Barbossa's monkey Jack, though at that point had no name. Then as they go out partying, carousing, they discover that they were cursed. Barbossa's crew learned how to undo the curse, most likely by going back to read the Aztec writing on the chest, by learning that they needed to put all the gold back. Bootstrap Bill had been feeling guilty because of what they did to Jack and sent one piece of the gold to Will in England, wanting the pirates to never be able to lift the curse. Barbossa got ticked off and strapped Bootstrap Bill to a cannon, and dropped him into the crushing depths of Davy Jones' Locker. However, they find out that all the pirates had to get all the gold back and add their blood to the chest.

=== Films ===
==== The Curse of the Black Pearl ====
Barbossa's original pirate flag, flown from the mast of the Black Pearl during his captaincy of the ship. Based on the Crossed Swords Jolly Roger falsely associated with John Rackham.

Captain Hector Barbossa, now only known as Barbossa, first appears in The Curse of the Black Pearl (2003).

Ten years before the events of The Curse of the Black Pearl, Barbossa led a mutiny against Jack Sparrow and marooned him on an uncharted island. Arriving at the treasure of Isla de Muerta, 882 identical pieces of Aztec gold, they claim it and spend it all. They realize too late that the gold was cursed, dooming the crew to become undead skeletons. Shortly after the mutiny, Barbossa has Bootstrap Bill Turner thrown overboard, attaching a cannon to his foot. The crew spend the next years retrieving the Aztec gold and amassing treasure, unable to find the last piece of gold, as Bootstrap Bill had sent it to his son Will Turner. Eight years prior to the events of the film, Barbossa sailed the Black Pearl at the crossing of England, where Will met Elizabeth Swann, who took Will's medallion.

When Elizabeth Swann falls into the sea wearing Will's medallion, it alerts the cursed pirates to its location. Barbossa has Port Royal attacked and Elizabeth captured, who poses as "Elizabeth Turner". Mistaking her for Bootstrap Bill's child, he takes her to the Isla de Muerta to use her blood in a ritual to break the curse, which fails. Will reveals himself as Bootstrap's son and offers Barbossa his blood in exchange for Elizabeth's safety. Barbossa has Elizabeth and Jack marooned on exactly the same uncharted island where he marooned Jack years earlier. Before Barbossa can perform the ritual, Jack Sparrow arrives to the island on board a Royal Navy ship and confronts Barbossa. A fight ensues between Barbossa and Jack. As Will breaks the curse, Barbossa is shot to death by his old captain.

==== Dead Man's Chest and At World's End ====
In Dead Man's Chest, Captain Barbossa's undead monkey "Jack" appeared aboard the Black Pearl before Jack Sparrow gave the monkey to the voodoo mystic Tia Dalma as payment. While the crew of the Black Pearl visits Tia Dalma's shack, Sparrow's crew sees Barbossa's corpse lying there, with only his boots visible. However, the closing scene of the film shows that Tia Dalma brought Barbossa back from the dead, with the resurrected captain biting an apple. It is later revealed in At World's End that Tia Dalma is actually the sea goddess Calypso in human form, Barbossa was a Pirate Lord of the Brethren Court, and they both struck a bargain. In return for his resurrection, Barbossa agreed to summon a meeting of the Brethren so they could release the goddess from her human bonds. However, because Jack Sparrow was also a Pirate Lord, they had to go rescue him at Davy Jones' Locker, where Sparrow was taken by Davy Jones' leviathan, the Kraken.

At World's End begins with Barbossa joining forces with Will Turner, Elizabeth Swann, and the Black Pearl crew in their attempt to rescue Jack from the Locker and rally the nine Pirate Lords of the Brethren Court against Lord Cutler Beckett of the East India Trading Company. As Barbossa negotiates with Pirate Lord Sao Feng, who possesses the navigational charts that serve as a map to the Locker, they are interrupted by an ambush by the EITC soldiers. Having acquired Sao Feng's map, as well as a ship and crew, Barbossa helps the crew find Jack, who first calls him "Hector" upon their reunion. After a series of betrayals and alliances, they reach Shipwreck Cove, where Barbossa convenes the meeting of the Pirate Lords. Barbossa proposes to free Calypso, which leads to a fight between the parties, and Elizabeth Swann is elected the new Pirate King. As negotiations fail and war is declared, Barbossa frees Calypso with the nine Pieces of Eight. The wrathful sea goddess creates a maelstrom, in which the Black Pearl battles the Flying Dutchman, and Barbossa officiated the marriage of Will Turner and Elizabeth Swann in the fight as captain. Barbossa witnessed Will becoming the new captain of the Dutchman upon Davy Jones's death and East India Trading Company's defeat and retreat from the Brethren Court's victory in battle. Later, Hector Barbossa steals the Black Pearl from Jack Sparrow once again and sails away, planning to use Sao Feng's map to find the Fountain of Youth. However, Jack has stolen the map from him in anticipation.

==== In between films ====
Sometime after these events Hector Barbossa fathers Carina Smyth and leaves her in an orphanage after her mother's death. Barbossa also lost the Black Pearl to Edward "Blackbeard" Teach, who attacked the ship without warning and used the power embedded in the Sword of Triton to turn the ship against his crew. This attack forced Barbossa to escape with his life by cutting off his right leg via self-dismemberment. Unbeknownst to Barbossa, who believed the Black Pearl was sunk, (Note: Screenwriter Terry Rossio released his unproduced screenplay for Pirates of the Caribbean: Dead Men Tell No Tales (2017), which includes additional information in extensive footnotes. Pertaining to On Stranger Tides, Rossio notes that Jack and Barbossa were each conning the other, while not knowing they were at the same time being conned. Barbossa does not know that the Black Pearl in a bottle, and Jack does not know the importance of Blackbeard's sword.) Blackbeard magicked the Pearl into a ship in a bottle along with a collection of conquered ships.

==== On Stranger Tides ====
In On Stranger Tides, set over a decade and seven years after the third film At World's End, it is revealed that Hector Barbossa had become a privateer in service to King George II. However, having yet to reveal the details on losing the Black Pearl and his right leg, Barbossa does not reveal his true agenda for revenge against Blackbeard as a goal since the very night it happened. When first asked by Jack Sparrow, Barbossa only stated that the Black Pearl was lost and sunk. Barbossa excelled so much at his new station that King George personally tasked him with finding the Fountain of Youth, as captain of HMS Providence. By this point, Barbossa gained much information and learned at least the basics on Blackbeard. Barbossa knows the name of Blackbeard's ship Queen Anne's Revenge, his obsession to find the Fountain of Youth, and even the importance of Blackbeard's Sword of Triton. Barbossa specifically knew Blackbeard's sword had the power to rule the winds of the ocean, as well as everything associated with the wind, including the ships at sea, their rigging, sails, etc. and that its powers were diminished away from the ship. To replace his missing right leg, Barbossa also started wearing a wooden peg leg with a hidden rum supply. After Jack Sparrow's capture and escape from King George, Barbossa forces Joshamee Gibbs, now in possession of the map, into assisting him on his quest. When they arrive at White Cap Bay, the Providence is attacked by mermaids. Making their way through the jungle, Barbossa reaches the ship of Ponce de Leon in search for the two chalices required for the ritual, where he meets Jack Sparrow. The two decide to team up to retrieve the missing chalices from the Spanish camp, where they get captured, and later escape with the chalices. Before retrieving the chalices, Barbossa reveals to Sparrow his true agenda: revenge against Blackbeard for the attack on the Black Pearl, which Barbossa truly believes to be sunk. Reaching the Fountain, Barbossa uses a sword poisoned using the innards of "poisonous toads" and engages Blackbeard in a duel, eventually mortally wounding him. Hector Barbossa claims Blackbeard's ship, crew, and sword as payment for his lost leg and returns to a life of piracy. The crew look on in wonder as Barbossa used Blackbeard's sword to unfurl the sails and fill them with wind, causing the Queen Anne's Revenge to sail forward at full speed and ordered to make way for Tortuga.

==== Dead Men Tell No Tales ====
Barbossa's new pirate flag in Dead Men Tell No Tales, flown by the individual ships in his fleet, and also displayed on the main topsail of the Queen Anne's Revenge itself.

In Dead Men Tell No Tales, set over 20 years after At World's End and about one year after On Stranger Tides, Captain Hector Barbossa settled into a growing and prosperous pirate empire, taking possession of the Queen Anne's Revenge as a result of defeating Captain Blackbeard and unaware of the magically shrunk Black Pearl in a bottle. Barbossa has achieved great success as a pirate and rules the Caribbean with a fleet of 10 ships, even having acquired a new golden peg leg. However, after three of his ships are sunk by the Silent Mary, the ghostly ship of the undead pirate hunter Capitán Armando Salazar, whom Jack Sparrow had unintentionally unleashed, Barbossa confronts Salazar and offers to lead him to Jack Sparrow. When Jack escapes to an island, the ghosts discover they cannot step on land, leading an enraged Salazar starts slaughtering Barbossa's crew. Although Barbossa was able to persuade Salazar to send him to fetch Sparrow, he truly intended to double-cross Salazar and enters another uneasy alliance with Sparrow to find the Trident of Poseidon. By this point, Barbossa knows of the current state of the Black Pearl as a ship in a bottle. Barbossa helps Sparrow release the Black Pearl from its imprisonment, restoring the ship to its former glory, before taking over as captain and attempts to outrun Salazar. Upon seeing Carina's diary, Hector realizes she is his daughter. However, Hector chooses not to tell Carina of her true parentage in order to allow her to keep her idealized picture of her father, whom she imagines to be an astronomer. When they reach the island where the Trident of Poseidon is located, a fight between the Black Pearl and the Silent Mary ensues, which later continues on the bottom of the ocean. Barbossa has himself lowered down with the ship's anchor to rescue Jack, Henry, and Carina. When Carina falls, Barbossa catches her, revealing a tattoo of the star constellation Carina, after which Carina realizes he is her father. Barbossa sacrifices his life to protect Carina from an approaching Salazar. Following these events, Carina takes up the last name Barbossa.

According to actor, Geoffrey Rush, he may not appear in any future Pirates of the Caribbean films. However, other interviews imply otherwise, as producer Jerry Bruckheimer said they can bring characters back, and Rush himself didn't seem completely opposed to returning to the series because he said, "[Barbossa] could come back like Hamlet's father, as a ghost. Just to annoy Jack."

== Other appearances ==
- In 2006, an animatronic Hector Barbossa was added (along with Jack Sparrow) to the original Pirates of the Caribbean theme park ride at various Disney parks, wherein he replaces the original ride's captain of the Wicked Wench.
- Hector Barbossa is one of only five Disney villains ever nominated for the MTV Movie Award for Best Villain, the others being Scar from The Lion King, Jadis the White Witch in The Chronicles of Narnia: The Lion, the Witch and the Wardrobe, Davy Jones in Dead Man's Chest, and Lots-O'-Huggin' Bear from Toy Story 3.
- Barbossa (along with another Black Pearl crewman) is pictured on the cover of issue No. 71 Piraten of WAS IST WAS, a German Knowledge-book series, aimed at children and adolescents.
- Barbossa was made into several action figures by NECA. He appeared in the first wave of Curse of the Black Pearl figures in his human form; that same figure was re-released as part of the fourth wave of Dead Man's Chest toys. Barbossa's cursed form was released as a box set, which also featured Jack Sparrow as a zombie, and the chest of cursed Aztec gold. Then, he was also released in the At World's End figure line. However, he did not come with Jack the Monkey, who was released in a figure set along with Marty. Lastly, Barbossa was featured in "On Stranger Tides" action figure wave with his peg leg and privateer suit. Barbossa was made as a plush toy for the M&M Dead Man's Chest.

=== Video games ===
- Barbossa was featured in almost all video games related to the series, namely Pirates of the Caribbean: The Curse of the Black Pearl (2003), Pirates of the Caribbean (2003), Pirates of the Caribbean: The Legend of Jack Sparrow (2006), Pirates of the Caribbean: At World's End (2007), Pirates of the Caribbean Online (2007), and Lego Pirates of the Caribbean: The Video Game (2011), in varying roles.
- Barbossa appears in the Kingdom Hearts series games Kingdom Hearts II and Kingdom Hearts III, voiced by Brian George in English and Haruhiko Jō in Japanese.
- Barbossa appears as a playable character in Disney Infinity.
- Barbossa appears as a playable character in Disney Magic Kingdoms.
- Barbossa appears as a playable character in Disney Heroes: Battle Mode.
- Barbossa appears in Sea of Thieves as part of the A Pirate's Life expansion.
- Barbossa appears as a playable character in Disney Speedstorm.
- Barbossa appears as a playable character in Fortnite.
- Barbossa appears as a playable character in Lego Pirates of the Caribbean: The Video Game.
