= Pirates of the Caribbean: The Price of Freedom =

2011 novel by Ann C. Crispin

- Author: Ann C. Crispin
- Language: English
- Genre: Adventure novel
- Publisher: Disney Editions
- Publication date: May 2011
- Publication place: United States
- Media type: Print (hardback and paperback)
- Pages: 672
- ISBN: 1-4231-0704-7

Pirates of the Caribbean: The Price of Freedom is a 2011 adventure novel written by Ann C. Crispin. The book details the adventures of Captain Jack Sparrow as a young man after the events of Pirates of the Caribbean: Jack Sparrow and before the events of Pirates of the Caribbean: Legends of the Brethren Court. Due to Crispin's death in September 2013, The Price of Freedom is the only Pirates of the Caribbean novel written by Crispin, with her final completed work being Time Horse.

== Plot ==
Twenty-five-year-old Jack Sparrow is a clean-cut merchant seaman pursuing a legitimate career as a first mate for the East India Trading Company. He sometimes thinks back to his boyhood pirating days, but he doesn't miss Teague's scrutiny or the constant threat of the noose. Besides, he doesn't have much choice – he broke the Code when he freed a friend who had been accused of rogue piracy, and he can no longer show his face in Shipwreck Cove.

When Jack's ship is attacked by pirates and his captain dies in the altercation, he suddenly finds himself in command. The wily sailor's skillful negotiations with the pirate captain—who turns out to be a woman from his past—result in a favorable outcome that puts Jack in line for an official promotion.

After making port in Africa, Jack is summoned by Cutler Beckett, who makes him captain of a ship called the Wicked Wench. Beckett gives Jack an assignment. He has heard a legend about a magical island named Zerzura whose labyrinthine bowels are said to contain a glorious treasure. Beckett suspects that one of his house slaves, a girl named Ayisha, is from Zerzura. He asks Jack to take her along on his voyage and seduce her into divulging the island's whereabouts. In payment for his services, Beckett promises Jack a share of the treasure.

But this task isn't as easy as Jack initially believes. Before she agrees to reveal the location of her home, Ayisha insists that Jack take her to the New World to rescue her brother, who has been sold into slavery in the Bahamas. Their voyage is long and arduous, and as they weather a vicious storm and a surprise attack from an old pirate foe, Jack grows to respect and admire Ayisha's bravery. He knows that Beckett intends to enslave her people after robbing them of their treasure, and Jack's moral compass revolts at the idea. It might be possible to deliver Ayisha safely to Zerzura, obtain some of the treasure, and convince Beckett that he never found it... but the greedy E.I.T.C. official has eyes everywhere, and if he learns that Jack has foiled his plans, he could take away the thing that Captain Sparrow loves most: his ship—and his freedom.

== Characters ==
- Jack Sparrow – a former pirate working for the EITC, captain of the Wicked Wench.
- Cutler Beckett – the EITC director for West Africa.
- Amenirdis/Ayisha – the lost princess from the island of Kerma.
- Robert "Robby" Greene – a former pirate, Jack's friend and first mate of the Wicked Wench.
- Esmeralda Maria Consuela Anna de Sevilla – the Pirate Lord of the Caribbean, Jack's love interest.
- Edward Teague – Jack's father, the Pirate Lord of Madagascar and Keeper of the Pirate Code.
- Ian Mercer – Beckett's right-hand man.
- Boris "Borya" Palachnik – the Pirate Lord of the Caspian Sea, leader of the rogue pirates.
- Christophe-Julien de Rapièr – Jack's former friend, one of the rogue pirates.
- Davy Jones – Lord of the underwater realms.
- Don Rafael – Esmeralda's grandfather, the Pirate Lord of the Caribbean.
- Hector Barbossa – a pirate captain in the Caribbean.
- Pintel and Ragetti – Barbossa's crewmembers
- Eduardo Villanueva – the Pirate Lord of the Adriatic Sea.
- Mistress Ching – the Pirate Lord of the Pacific Ocean.

== Ships ==
- Wicked Wench, an EITC merchant ship owned by Beckett and captained by Sparrow.
- Fair Wind, an EITC merchant brig.
- Venganza, a pirate frigate captained by Don Rafael and Esmeralda.
- La Vipère, Christophe's pirate brigantine.
- Koldunya, Borya's pirate sloop.
- Troubadour, Teague's pirate ship.
- Sentinel, an EITC brig, Beckett's flagship.

== Background ==
When an editor working for The Walt Disney Company was seeking an author to write a novel dealing with the backstory of Captain Jack Sparrow, a major character from the Pirates of the Caribbean franchise, they contacted A.C. Crispin's agent and contracted her to write the book after reading The Han Solo Trilogy, which focused on Han Solo's backstory. According to Crispin herself, it took her three years to write and she did a lot of research on the historical period and the nautical stuff. She was also given the script for At World's End before the film released, but the book was finished before the script for On Stranger Tides was written. The instructions for Crispin in writing The Price of Freedom were to "stick to historical fact, unless it conflicts with established Pirates of the Caribbean continuity." Crispin made a faithful effort to do this, having done plenty of research, with Under the Black Flag by David Cordingly being one of the four pirate-related books she found herself using the most consistently. When releasing the fifth excerpt of her book, Crispin spoke of how she was privileged to write the scene where Han first beheld—and fell for—the Millennium Falcon in The Han Solo Trilogy. She assured fans it was every bit as thrilling to write the scene with Jack Sparrow and the Wicked Wench. The Price of Freedom was published on May 17, 2011.
