= Tia Dalma =

Character from Pirates of the Caribbean

- Pirates of the Caribbean character
- Naomie Harris as Tia Dalma in Pirates of the Caribbean: At World's End
- First appearance: Pirates of the Caribbean: Dead Man's Chest
- Based on: Calypso
- Portrayed by: Naomie Harris
- Voiced by: Julianne Buescher (video games, theme parks); Leslie Miller (Kingdom Hearts III)

In-universe information
- Species: Goddess
- Gender: Female
- Occupation: Obeah sorceress Hoodoo and Voodoo practitioner

Tia Dalma is a fictional character from Disney's Pirates of the Caribbean franchise, making her debut in Pirates of the Caribbean: Dead Man's Chest. She is a voodoo and hoodoo practitioner who once was in love with the pirate Davy Jones, and ultimately cursed him after his betrayal toward her and abandonment of his duties. In the third film, Tia Dalma is revealed to be the mortal guise of Calypso, the goddess of the sea.

Tia Dalma is a prominent character in Disney media, appearing prominently in printed media and crossover video games. The character continues to hold a likable reception, with Naomie Harris receiving positive reviews from critics for her performance as Tia Dalma.

== Characteristics ==
The character was introduced as the mystic Tia Dalma, though later revealed to be the mortal guise of Calypso, the daughter of Atlas and the sea goddess that sailors both loved and feared. As Tia Dalma, she is a voodoo priestess with black teeth and blue lips, and she has her hair in dreadlocks; she speaks in Jamaican Patois. Harris's mother, a Jamaican immigrant, was her accent coach for the films. In personality terms, she is described as flirtatious, "coquettish, sensual, pleasure-loving, and extravagant", alluding to the belief that Calypso was a seductress. Tia Dalma is depicted barefoot in the movie-based comics in Pirati dei Caraibi Magazine. The Kingdom Keepers book series also described her as perpetually barefoot, which was a plot point in The Insider.

Tia Dalma is portrayed as an ally to Jack Sparrow, trading with him, aiding in his rescue, and occasionally flirting. It is implied they shared a romantic history.

As the series progresses, it is revealed that as Calypso, she became romantically involved with Davy Jones, and their mutual betrayal is what led to both of their transformations. Calypso had charged Davy Jones with ferrying souls of the dead, promising to meet with him again in ten years. However, when the time came, she was nowhere to be found. In retaliation, he revealed to the First Brethren Court of pirates how to imprison her in mortal form, then carved his own heart out, and locked it in the Dead Man's Chest. While still hiding herself as Tia Dalma, she recounts the story to Sparrow and his crew, describing Calypso as "changing, harsh and untamable as the sea".

== Appearances ==
=== Films ===
==== Dead Man's Chest ====
When the events of Dead Man's Chest begin, Jack Sparrow returns to see Tia Dalma after many years, in need of her assistance. Pursued across the Caribbean by Davy Jones's Kraken, he plans to find the Dead Man's Chest. This chest contains Jones's heart, and offers the only means to kill him. A series of trades takes place, leaving Jack with the location of the Flying Dutchman and a jar of dirt to protect him from Jones, while Tia Dalma gains possession of the undead monkey belonging to the late Captain Barbossa.

Jack's crew returns to Tia Dalma's shack after Jack is dragged to Davy Jones's Locker by the Kraken. Tia Dalma has apparently foreseen this eventuality, and informs the mourning crew that there is a chance to save Jack. She reveals that she has resurrected Barbossa, who will help lead the rescue mission.

==== At World's End ====
Tia Dalma makes a major and pivotal appearance in the film. She joins Barbossa, Will, Elizabeth, and the rest of the Black Pearl's crew as they travel to Singapore. There, they infiltrate Sao Feng's headquarters to acquire the navigational chart needed to sail to World's End and Davy Jones' Locker, barely escaping the clutches of the East India Trading Company. On the journey, she explains to Pintel and Ragetti that Jack Sparrow cannot be resurrected the same way Barbossa was because Sparrow was "taken" by the Kraken while Barbossa died from normal, earthly causes. When rescuing Jack from the Locker, Tia Dalma flirts with him and references their past romantic relationship. As the group searches for an escape route back to the mortal world, they encounter numerous souls adrift in the water. Tia Dalma tells the group the story of Davy Jones and Calypso, but does not reveal her identity. While caressing her locket, she reminisces that Davy Jones was once human.

Later, it is revealed that Tia Dalma is Calypso, bound into human form. Her true motives for resurrecting Barbossa and Jack are unveiled when it is learned that both are Pirate Lords of the Brethren Court. Each has their respective "Pieces of Eight", the talismans necessary to free Calypso. She resurrected Barbossa to obtain his piece, and rescued Jack because his Piece went with him to Davy Jones' Locker. Upon arrival at Shipwreck Cove, she reminds Barbossa of her powers by gripping his hand and temporarily rendering it skeletal (a subtle reference to Pirates of the Caribbean: The Curse of the Black Pearl). She warns him that it was only by her power that he is alive again and that he must fulfill their agreement to release her. If he failed, she would kill him. Tia Dalma and her estranged lover, Davy Jones, briefly reunite while she is locked in the brig of the ship. Calypso says she still feels deeply for Jones. She responds to his anger by saying that Davy Jones never would have loved her if not for her uncontrollable and unpredictable nature. Calypso also chastises him for abandoning his duty to ferry souls to the other world. It was because he neglected his charges that Davy Jones became a monster. Calypso is also furious that the Pirate Lords trapped her in her human form. Thus, her true motives are revealed: she plans to use her powers against the current court in revenge for the original act of turning her into a human. She will also fully give her love to Jones, and it appears they reconcile. When she touches Jones, he momentarily transforms back into the man he once was. Jones's parting words betray that his heart will always belong to her.

As the battle between the East India Trading Company and the pirates looms, Barbossa and Ragetti release Calypso from her human form. Before Calypso could change into another shape, Will tells her that it was Davy Jones who betrayed her by revealing to the first Brethren Court how to bind her into her human form. Bound by ropes, she grows to nearly sixty feet high, towering over the crew. Barbossa asks that she fulfill their agreement and use her powers to aid the pirates. Calypso breaks free, transforming into thousands of crabs that engulf the ship and flee into the sea. Her fury then creates a violent maelstrom that becomes the battlefield between the Black Pearl and the Flying Dutchman. Instead of aiding a particular side, her wrath is directed both at the pirate lords for imprisoning her and at Davy Jones for his betrayal. But as Will Turner lies run through by Davy Jones's sword, he stabs Jones's heart with Jack Sparrow's help, and Jones, now fatally wounded, falls from the Dutchman's deck into the maelstrom, crying out one final word: "Calypso!".

=== On Stranger Tides ===
While Calypso does not appear, Tia Dalma is referenced in On Stranger Tides. In Ted Elliott and Terry Rossio's screenplay of On Stranger Tides, Jack Sparrow has a ring pilfered from Tia Dalma's shack in Dead Man's Chest, which he gives to Angelica, who said she had to trade it to learn the "rules of the Fountain" known as the profane ritual. Later, as Jack and Angelica discuss the ritual, the latter grabs a snake and wields it at Jack before saying, (a la Tia Dalma) "All da years dat dey have lived, and they could have lived, if fate'd been kinder." Although Tia Dalma was not directly referenced in the final cut of the film, her backstory with Angelica would still be mentioned in other media, notably Pirates of the Caribbean: On Stranger Tides: The Visual Guide. Around the release of On Stranger Tides in 2011, Naomie Harris stated that she was asked to record some Tia Dalma lines that would be said in the film by Penélope Cruz, who portrayed Angelica.

=== Other appearances ===
==== Video games ====
Tia Dalma has made numerous appearances in Disney-related video games, prominently as a crossover character. Julianna Buescher primarily voiced Tia Dalma, with her first work being in the At World's End video game adaptation, which was released on Xbox 360, PlayStation 3, Wii, PSP, PlayStation 2, PC, and Nintendo DS formats. The PS3 and Xbox 360 versions of the game featured the "Story of Davy Jones and Calypso", which detailed the backstory of Davy Jones and Calypso, confirming that Calypso was the daughter of Atlas, as well as the curse of the Flying Dutchman, where it was stated that the Captain of the Dutchman would be freed by finding a love that was true. The character also appeared in the 2011 Lego-themed video game Lego Pirates of the Caribbean: The Video Game and in the 2013 game Disney Infinity as a non-playable character who assists the Pirates of the Caribbean characters.

She later made playable appearances in Disney Crossy Road, Disney Emoji Blitz, Disney Heroes: Battle Mode, and Disney Magic Kingdoms.

In 2018, a character skin for Tia Dalma was released for a Pirates of the Caribbean-themed world for Minecraft. In 2021, Tia Dalma made an appearance in Sea of Thieves: A Pirate's Life alongside several other Pirates of the Caribbean characters.

Tia Dalma appears in Kingdom Hearts III, voiced by Leslie Miller, who reprises her role from the At World's End video game.

==== Printed media ====
Tia Dalma appears in Pirati dei Caraibi Magazine, and in several book and graphic novel adaptations of the Pirates of the Caribbean film series.

In Kingdom Keepers, Tia Dalma appears with a major role near the fifth book of the series, Shell Game, as a member of the Overtakers. Having set up residence in Castaway Cay, she meets with Jafar, who had been sent by the Overtakers to bring her aboard the Dream. Serving as the guardian of the Overtakers' DHI server, she fights with Finn and Willa, only to be given a death threat unless she released Finn's mother from Overtaker control. In the sixth book, Dark Passage, she works with the witches Maleficent and the Evil Queen to bring Chernabog out of his stupor and back to full power; she burns a key flower and tricks Finn into fatally stabbing his best friend, allowing Chernabog to lick the blood and fully awaken. She is knocked out, and taken hostage by the Keepers. In the final book The Insider, Tia Dalma escapes custody and searches through the maze, freeing Chernabog and the Evil Queen, while collecting some of Maleficent's bones; she was horrified that a powerful practitioner of the black arts had been killed. She manipulates a supply driver for Disneyland to get herself and her allies to their new hideouts. She originally leads the attack against the Keepers in Toontown, but forfeits leadership to the Queen. Tia Dalma instead focused on the spell needed to resurrect Maleficent.

==== Merchandise ====
Tia Dalma has appeared as part of several Pirates of the Caribbean-themed merchandise, including toy dolls, Lego minifigures, attire, and action figures. She also appears as a Disney Crossy Road figure.

== Reception ==
Tia Dalma has received a positive reception since her first appearance in Dead Man's Chest, with most of the praise targeted towards Naomie Harris' performance. Cathal Gunning for Screen Rant cited her as one of the more "important" and "fascinating characters", but criticized her underdeveloped arc, writing: "The Pirates of the Caribbean franchise featured an intriguing character in Naomi Harris' Tia Dalma, but who was the sorceress, what were her powers, and how powerful was she? Despite her disappearing at the end of the first trilogy, she was easily one of the most formidable characters in the entire franchise."

Naomie Harris, who was interviewed in 2007 by Roger Moore for the Orlando Sentinel, commented on her own portrayal, describing Tia Dalma as a "larger-than-life character, and you aren't bound by the constraints of reality with her."

=== Character analysis ===
Tia Dalma has been compared to Mami Wata from Jamaican folklore, a mysterious and seductive spirit linked to the sea. As a highly sexualized exotic female character, she was said to represent the romanticized colonial era perception of the Caribbean, and her relationships with the pirates to mirror the power dynamics of colonial conquest. However, as noted by critics, Tia Dalma has the upper hand in these power dynamics due to her "dominion over masculine energies", and the pirates' attempts to gain control over her by entrapping her in a human body are eventually futile. Heike Steinhoff compares her to the goddess Calypso, though her power is circumscribed by her being kept inside her hut, and she notes that her character borrows from "'racial' and ethnic stereotypes which connect African and South-American descent to elements of nature and supernatural powers". Critics also compared her character to Yoda from Star Wars due to the fact that both characters are swamp-dwelling eccentric sages with peculiar speech patterns.

== See also ==
- Voodoo in popular culture
