= Joshamee Gibbs =

Fictional character in Pirates of the Caribbean

- Pirates of the Caribbean character
- Kevin R. McNally as Joshamee Gibbs in Pirates of the Caribbean: Dead Man's Chest
- First appearance: The Curse of the Black Pearl (Junior Novelization) (2003)
- Portrayed by: Kevin R. McNally
- Voiced by: Steve Blum (Pirates of the Caribbean: The Legend of Jack Sparrow); Kevin R. McNally

In-universe information
- Gender: Male
- Occupation: First Mate and quartermaster Formerly: Boatswain in the Royal Navy
- Nationality: English
- Appearance(s): Pirates of the Caribbean (film series); Pirates of the Caribbean: At World's End (video game); Pirates of the Caribbean Online; Kingdom Hearts III

Joshamee Gibbs (often referred to as Mr Gibbs or Master Gibbs) is a fictional character in the Pirates of the Caribbean film series. Gibbs is portrayed by Kevin R. McNally. Alongside Jack Sparrow and Hector Barbossa, Gibbs is one of the few characters to appear in every film.

In the video game Pirates of the Caribbean: The Legend of Jack Sparrow, Gibbs was voiced by Steven Blum. Kevin McNally reprised his role in other games, including the At World's End video game, Pirates of the Caribbean Online, Disney Infinity, Kingdom Hearts III, and Sea of Thieves: A Pirate's Life, a five-part Pirate of the Caribbean adventure Downloadable content (DLC) for Sea of Thieves released in June 2021.

Writer Terry Rossio has said he considers Gibbs to be the most virtuous character, as of the 2007 film Pirates of the Caribbean: At World's End.

== Films ==
=== The Curse of the Black Pearl ===
Gibbs is first seen as an Able Seaman in the Royal Navy, aboard the vessel carrying Governor Weatherby Swann and his young daughter Elizabeth from England to Port Royal. Gibbs is highly superstitious and fearful of the mere mention of pirates. When they come across a wrecked vessel (from which young Will Turner is rescued), Gibbs is the first to suggest it was attacked by pirates.

Sometime over the next eight years, Gibbs either leaves or is expelled from the Royal Navy. Despite his initial dread of pirates, he became good friends with one: the Black Pearl's former captain, Jack Sparrow. Jack's history is well known to Gibbs, including his quest to regain the Pearl and seek revenge on his mutinous first mate, Hector Barbossa. He is also familiar with the curse that has afflicted the Black Pearl's crew and how to break it. He has not grown any less superstitious, however, and continually comments about what causes bad luck, such as bringing women aboard ships, as well as waking a man while he's sleeping.

Jack finds Gibbs sleeping among pigs in Tortuga after he and Will escape from Port Royal. They assemble a crew to man the stolen navy vessel Interceptor. After Jack falls behind during a confrontation with the pirates at Isla de Muerta, Gibbs assumes command, indicating he is now Jack's first mate.

Gibbs and the crew flee from Barbossa. The Pearl quickly catches the Interceptor and destroys it. Gibbs and the rest of the crew are captured.

On Isla de Muerta, Elizabeth frees Gibbs and the crew from the Pearl's brig, and they take control of the ship. Although Elizabeth tries to convince Gibbs and the others to save Jack and Will, who are fighting Barbossa on the island, they set sail with the Pearl. They tell Elizabeth that Jack owes them a ship. However, they later rescue Jack from execution in Port Royal. With Jack back in command of the Black Pearl, Gibbs stays on as second in command.

=== Dead Man's Chest ===
Gibbs is still serving under Jack aboard the Black Pearl. Jack obtains a drawing of the key to the Dead Man's Chest. When Mr. Gibbs asks if the chest and key are what they are looking for, Jack refuses to give a clear answer. Afterwards, Gibbs, Jack, and the crew are captured by a cannibalistic native tribe after they beach the Black Pearl on the mysterious island of Pelegosto. Some time later, they narrowly escape, following Will Turner's arrival while searching for Jack. When Jack reveals the Black Spot to Tia Dalma, Gibbs panics.

Gibbs accompanies Jack on his quest to find the Dead Man's Chest, containing the heart of Davy Jones. When Jack goes ashore on Isla Cruces, he leaves Gibbs and the rest of the crew on the Pearl.

Gibbs is also among the few survivors after the Pearl is destroyed by the Kraken. When Gibbs and the other survivors return to Tia Dalma for help, she asks if they would be willing to do anything to save Jack and the Pearl. Gibbs is the first to accept the challenge.

=== At World's End ===
Gibbs travels to Singapore with Elizabeth and Barbossa, where he aids in the attempt to secure a ship and crew from Sao Feng. They make their way to World's End to rescue Jack Sparrow. When Jack suggests leaving some people behind in Davy Jones's Locker, Gibbs is one of the few people Jack wants to take back to the world of the living. He also indicates that he came to save Jack because he missed him, and not because of any ulterior motive.

During the meeting of the Fourth Brethren Court, Pintel notices that the Nine Pieces of Eight are in fact "just pieces of junk." Gibbs provides the backstory for the pieces of eight and their role in imprisoning Calypso. Later, he fights against the Dutchman during the battle in Calypso's maelstrom.

At the end of the film, Gibbs passes out drunk and lets Barbossa steal the Black Pearl. Despite his allowing the Pearl to be stolen, he and Jack part as friends. Gibbs then stays behind in Tortuga with Scarlett and Giselle while Jack tries to find the Fountain of Youth.

=== On Stranger Tides ===
In London, Gibbs is arrested and wrongfully accused of being Jack Sparrow. The real Jack Sparrow, posing as a judge, comes to his aid and gives him a life sentence instead of the expected death penalty. After being arrested by the royal guard and sent to prison, Gibbs manages to steal Jack's map and memorize it. That night, after Jack Sparrow escapes the palace, Gibbs is sentenced to hang anyway. He is surprised to see that Barbossa is now a privateer in the service of the King, although their relationship is still strained, because Gibbs has little or no respect for his former comrade because of his past actions of betrayal.

Barbossa tries interrogating Gibbs for information about Jack's plans. When Gibbs offers to lead Barbossa in search of the Fountain of Youth, Barbossa refuses and threatens him with execution if he doesn't give any useful information. To save his own life, Gibbs reveals the map. But knowing of Barbossa's intents to betray him, burns the map so that Barbossa would then have no choice but to take him along to search for the fountain. Barbossa begrudgingly allows Gibbs to join them on the expedition but takes advantage of the situation to make Gibbs' life miserable, by putting a lot of pressure on him, while Gibbs leads them to the destination (at one point threatening to kill Gibbs when Gibbs gets distracted by the sight of their ship sinking in a harbor with the crew being eaten by mermaids).

Gibbs is eventually reunited with Jack. He uses Jack's magical compass to find the Queen Anne's Revenge and retrieve the Black Pearl, which has been magically shrunk and imprisoned in a bottle. He reunites with Jack after the battle; he and Sparrow plan to look for a way to restore the Pearl to her original size.

=== Dead Men Tell No Tales ===
In the film, Gibbs is still Jack's first mate. Jack Sparrow has a rickety ship that is barely put together, called The Dying Gull. He has Gibbs, Scrum, Marty, and a few others as his crew. In the opening, Jack, Gibbs and the crew attempt to rob a bank in the island of St. Martin by using horses to pull a safe full of money to them. Their plan backfires when the horses end up pulling the safe and the bank with them. They drag the bank through the town and by the time they escape, the safe is empty after losing its savings during the robbery.

Feeling like Sparrow has lost it, Gibbs and the crew part ways with Jack and ditch the Dying Gull with Gibbs remarking to Sparrow that "we've reached the end of the horizon." However, when Sparrow is arrested and sentenced to be executed by guillotine, Gibbs and the crew assist Henry Turner in his attempt to save Sparrow. They attack the execution event by cannon-fire and save Sparrow and an astronomer named Carina from execution. Sparrow, Turner, Gibbs and the crew set out on a journey to find the Trident of Poseidon to break Will Turner's curse and stop Sparrow's old nemesis, Armando Salazar, from exacting his revenge on Sparrow.

When Salazar catches up with the Dying Gull, Gibbs and the crew stay behind on the ship as Sparrow, Henry Turner, and Carine Smyth flee to the same deserted island where the Kraken was slain many years before. When the crew sees a Royal Navy ship arrive at the scene, Gibbs hands the captain's hat to Scrum so that Scrum would take the fall for being a pirate captain, instead of Gibbs. The crew is captured and locked in the brig of the ship. The crew escapes the ship by picking the lock on their cell with a crewman's toenail, climbing off the ship and into a lifeboat. They row out to the regenerated Black Pearl where they reunite with Sparrow and Hector Barbossa. When Salazar catches up to the Pearl, the pirate crews of Sparrow and Barbossa battle Salazar's undead crew. Eventually Salazar captures Henry and they flee.

After the final battle between the crew and Salazar in the trench in the ocean, Gibbs and the crew lower the anchor to help Sparrow, Smyth, and Turner back onto the ship. Barbossa sacrifices himself to help his allies escape and kills Salazar before falling to his death. When Barbossa dies, Gibbs and the crew have a brief moment of silence and lower their hats in tribute to their fallen captain. Gibbs, the crew, and Sparrow drop off Smyth and Henry Turner to their home, before sailing off, to enjoy the rest of their lives as pirates.

== Other appearances ==
- Gibbs made his debut appearance in the Kingdom Hearts video game series in 2019's Kingdom Hearts III, reprising his role from Pirates of the Caribbean: At World's End, with McNally returning to voice him for the English-language version.
- He appeared in Sea of Thieves 2021's Pirates of the Caribbean expansion ("A Pirate's Life"), with McNally again returning to voice the character.
