= List of Pirates of the Caribbean video games =

The Pirates of the Caribbean franchise logo

Pirates of the Caribbean is a Walt Disney Company franchise that originated with the theme park attraction of the same name opened at Disneyland in 1967, the last such attraction that Walt Disney himself oversaw the building of. Although the franchise originated from ride attractions, it gained mainstream popularity in the 2000s with the release of the film series created by Ted Elliott and Terry Rossio, which was followed by the release of several video games attached to both the films and the franchise. The first two games, The Curse of the Black Pearl and Pirates of the Caribbean, released by TDK Mediactive and Bethesda Softworks respectively, are based on the first film in the franchise, The Curse of the Black Pearl (2003). The games are set in the same universe and storyline as the film, but the former is a prequel involving Captain Jack Sparrow and the latter had no relation to the characters featured in the film. The Legend of Jack Sparrow, released in 2006, featured several adventures of Sparrow after the events of the second film, Dead Man's Chest (2006).

The video game, At World's End, followed in 2007. The game, released as a tie-in to the film of the same name, follows the same story explored in both the second and third films, and includes new characters and missions. That same year, Pirates of the Caribbean Online was released. It was scheduled to be released alongside the second film, but suffered several delays during development. Armada of the Damned was announced in 2009 as an open world action-adventure role-playing game, though while set for a 2011 release, the game was canceled in 2010. Lego Pirates of the Caribbean launched with the release of the fourth film, On Stranger Tides (2011); the game's storyline covers all four films.

By May 2009, the series shipped more than 6 million units worldwide.

== Video games ==
11 video games based on the Pirates of the Caribbean franchise have been released, and one other game was cancelled before release. The following table showcases the correspondent title, release date, publisher, developer, and the platforms on which each game was released along with any other relevant information. A detailed overview of each game can be found in the corresponding articles, with the exception of games without articles.

Key
Blank cell indicates title was not released on any platform(s) by the specified manufacturers
Cell with games console(s) indicates title was released on platform(s) by the specified manufacturers

List of Pirates of the Caribbean video games
Title	Release details	Platform(s)			
Title	Release details	Microsoft	Sony	Nintendo	Other
Pirates of the Caribbean: The Curse of the Black Pearl	Genre: Action-adventure; Publisher: TDK Mediactive; Developer: Pocket Studios; Release date: 19 June 2003			GBA	
Pirates of the Caribbean	Genre: Action role-playing; Publisher: 1C, Bethesda Softworks, Ubi Soft; Developer: Akella; Release date: 8 July 2003	Windows; Xbox			
Pirates of the Caribbean: Dead Man's Chest	Genre: Action-adventure; Publisher: Buena Vista Games; Developer: Griptonite Games, Amaze Entertainment, Floodgate Entertainment; Release date: 27 June 2006		PSP	DS; GBA	Mobile phone
Pirates of the Caribbean: The Legend of Jack Sparrow	Genre: Action-adventure, Hack and slash; Publisher: Bethesda Softworks, Ubisoft; Developer: 7 Studios; Release date: 27 June 2006	Windows	PS2		
Pirates of the Caribbean Multiplayer Mobile	Genre: MMO; Publisher: Disney Mobile; Developer: Floodgate Entertainment; Release date: 7 July 2006				Mobile phones
Pirates of the Caribbean: At World's End	Genre: Action-adventure, Hack and slash; Publisher: Disney Interactive Studios; Developer: Eurocom Developments, Capybara Games, Amaze Entertainment; Release date: 22 May 2007	Windows; Xbox 360	PS2; PS3; PSP	DS; Wii	J2ME
Pirates of the Caribbean Online	Genre: MMORPG; Publisher: Disney Online; Developer: Disney Online, SilverTree Media; Release date: 31 October 2007 Closed: 19 September 2013	Windows			OS X
Pirates of the Caribbean: Aegir's Fire	Genre: Action; Publisher: Disney Interactive Studios; Developer: Leviathan Games; Release date: 20 February 2008				iPod
Pirates of the Caribbean: Armada of the Damned	Genre: Action-adventure, role-playing; Publisher: Disney Interactive Studios; Developer: Propaganda Games; Release date: Cancelled	Windows; Xbox 360	PS3		
Lego Pirates of the Caribbean: The Video Game	Genre: Action-adventure; Publisher: Disney Interactive Studios; Developers: Traveller's Tales, TT Fusion; Release date: 10 May 2011	Windows; Xbox 360	PS3; PSP	DS; 3DS; Wii	OS X
Pirates of the Caribbean: Master of the Seas	Genre: Action, Strategy; Publisher: Disney Mobile; Developer: Disney Mobile; Release date: 4 October 2011 Closed: 29 August 2014				Android iOS
Pirates of the Caribbean: Tides of War	Genre: MMORPG, Strategy; Publisher: JOYCITY; Developer: JOYCITY; Release date: 10 May 2017	Windows			Android iOS

=== Related video games ===
Video games that include material related to the Pirates of the Caribbean franchise.

Title	Release details	Platform(s)			
Title	Release details	Microsoft	Sony	Nintendo	Other
Adventures in the Magic Kingdom	Genre: Action; Publisher: Capcom; Developer: Capcom; Release date: June, 1990			Nintendo Entertainment System	
Pirates of the Caribbean: Battle for Buccaneer Gold	Genre: Arcade, shooter; Publisher: Walt Disney Parks and Resorts, Inc.; Developer: Walt Disney Imagineering; Release date: 2000				Arcade
Kingdom Hearts II	Genre: Action role-playing; Publisher: Square Enix; Developer: Square Enix Product Development Division 1; Release date: December 22, 2005		PS2		
Kinect: Disneyland Adventures	Genre: Open world; Publisher: Microsoft Studios; Developers: Frontier Developments; Asobo Studio (remaster); Release date: November 15, 2011	Xbox 360; Xbox One; Microsoft Windows			
Disney Infinity	Genre: Action-adventure; Publisher: Disney Interactive Studios; Developers: Avalanche Software; Heavy Iron Studios; Release date: August 18, 2013	Xbox 360; Microsoft Windows	PS3	Wii; Wii U	iOS
Disney Infinity: Toy Box Challenge	Genre: Party; Publisher: Disney Interactive Studios; Developers: Altron; Release date: August 18, 2013			Nintendo 3DS	
Disney Magic Kingdoms	Genre: World builder; Publisher: Gameloft; Developer: Gameloft; Release date: September 14, 2016	Microsoft Windows			iOS; Android
Kingdom Hearts III	Genre: Action role-playing; Publisher: Square Enix; Developer: Square Enix Business Division 3; Release date: January 25, 2019	Xbox One; Microsoft Windows	PS4	Nintendo Switch	
Sea of Thieves	Genre: First-person action-adventure; Publisher: Microsoft Studios; Developer: Rare; Release date: June 22, 2021	Xbox One; Microsoft Windows; Xbox Series X/S	PS5		
Disney Wonderful Worlds	Genre: Tile-matching; Publisher: Ludia; Developer: Ludia; Release date: October 7, 2021				Android
Disney Mirrorverse	Genre: Action role-playing; Publisher: Kabam; Developer: Kabam; Release date: June 23, 2022				iOS; Android
Disney Speedstorm	Genre: Kart racing; Publisher: Gameloft; Developer: Gameloft Barcelona; Release date: September 28, 2023	Microsoft Windows; Xbox One; Xbox Series X/S	PS4; PS5	Nintendo Switch	iOS; Android
Disney Dreamlight Valley	Genre: Life simulation, adventure; Publisher: Gameloft; Developer: Gameloft; Release date: December 5, 2023	Microsoft Windows; Xbox One; Xbox Series X/S	PS4; PS5	Nintendo Switch	iOS

== See also ==
- List of video game franchises
