= List of locations in Pirates of the Caribbean =

This is a list of islands and other locations appearing in the Pirates of the Caribbean film series.

== Cuba ==
Cuba is an island where Tia Dalma's shack is located, on wooden pylons in the swamps of the cypress forest along the Pantano River. While it is implied in Pirates of the Caribbean: Dead Man's Chest the river and shack was located on Isla de Pelegostos, the exact location was never said onscreen nor revealed in related promotional materials, including an accompanying book for the film, and the Pirates of the Caribbean: Jack Sparrow series of books. Both the Pantano River and Tia Dalma's shack were said to be located in Cuba, according to the official Disney Pirates of the Caribbean films website and the video game Pirates of the Caribbean Online.

After escaping Isla de Pelegostos, Jack Sparrow, Will Turner and the crew of the Black Pearl seek out Tia Dalma, an obeah woman and mystic, and trades Barbossa's undead monkey for information about the key to the Dead Man's Chest, which contains the still-beating heart of Davy Jones. Upon learning that Jack has the Black Spot on his hand, Tia Dalma gives Jack a jar of dirt, which Dalma claims will protect Sparrow from Davy Jones, and uses crab claws to help Jack's crew find the Flying Dutchman. After Jack was taken to Davy Jones's Locker by the Kraken, his crew return to Dalma's shack. Dalma reveals that she has resurrected Barbossa, and they will lead a mission to rescue Jack.

In At World's End, Cuba can be seen with Florida drawn with "Ponce de León 1523" on the map to the Fountain of Youth.

Scenes on the Pantano River in Dead Man's Chest were filmed in the Indian River on Dominica, while the outside and inside of Tia Dalma's shack were filmed in Walt Disney Studios on Burbank. The Pantano River bayou set at Disney was also designed to match the actual location chosen in Dominica.

== Davy Jones' Locker ==
Davy Jones' Locker is a fictional place first mentioned in Pirates of the Caribbean: The Curse of the Black Pearl and Dead Man's Chest before being featured prominently in At World's End. Based on a real superstition of the same name, Davy Jones' Locker is the euphemistic nautical idiom meaning "the bottom of the sea". The Locker is also a realm in the Land of the Dead, similar to purgatory.

When "Bootstrap" Bill Turner was talked of in The Curse of the Black Pearl, Pintel and Ragetti tell Will Turner that Bootstrap Bill was sent to the crushing oblivion of Davy Jones' Locker. In Dead Man's Chest, after Jack Sparrow is taken to the Locker by the Kraken, Calypso organizes a mission to rescue him from the Locker back to the land of the living.

In At World's End, Calypso is accompanied by Elizabeth Swann, Will Turner, and Hector Barbossa, among others. They reach the Locker by the use of magical charts leading to World's End. Sao Feng, one of the nine Pirate Lords, was the previous owner of these charts. After the crew reach the Locker, they find Jack and the Black Pearl stranded in the desert. Jack, unable to move the ship, has begun to hallucinate. The ship is transported to the ocean by many crabs under the control of Calypso. While on the ocean, the crew see the ghost of Governor Weatherby Swann, who has been murdered on the orders of Cutler Beckett. By deciphering the clues on Sao Feng's charts, Jack discovers the way to escape the Locker. At sunset, the crew capsizes the ship; this triggers a green flash and returns the Pearl to the world of the living, effectively reviving Jack.

The arid plain where the Black Pearl is beached was filmed at the Bonneville Salt Flats in Utah. The shore where the Pearl re-enters the ocean was filmed at the Guadalupe-Nipomo Dunes in California.

== Devil's Triangle ==
The Devil's Triangle was a mysterious and mythical area in the Caribbean Sea. According to Javier Bardem, the Devil's Triangle existed hundreds of years before the Bermuda Triangle. While the British themselves believed the Triangle to be an old sailor's myth, the cartographers referred to the area as "Uncharted Waters" located west of the Windward Isles in the Lesser Antilles.

In a flashback sequence, pirate ships battled the Silent Mary, under the command of Captain Armando Salazar, a pirate hunter of the Spanish Royal Navy. Jack Sparrow, as a young pirate, tricked Salazar into entering the Devil's Triangle and thus had Salazar, along with his ship and crew, inadvertently turn undead into an undead crew of ghosts on a ghost ship.

Many years later, Henry Turner, the son of William Turner, is aboard a British Navy ship which sails into the Devil's Triangle despite Henry's pleas and comes across the Silent Mary. Henry, who was put in the brig his insobrdination for trying to prevent the ship from sailing into the Triangle, escapes the slaughter caused on deck by Salazar's crew, who slaughter all other sailors and leave Henry as the sole survivor so that he can deliver the message of Salazar's return to Jack Sparrow, as "dead men tell no tales". Jack later trades his compass for a drink, an act that destroys the Devil's Triangle and frees Salazar's undead crew to hunt down Jack to exact their revenge.

== Isla Cruces ==
Isla Cruces is a fictional tropical island introduced in Dead Man's Chest. It is the place where Davy Jones buried the eponymous 'Dead Man's Chest', which contains his beating heart; stabbing the heart is the only way to kill Jones.

The island appears to have been abandoned; the previous occupants are unknown, but there are crumbling buildings indicating that it was once inhabited. On the island, Jack Sparrow, Will Turner, and James Norrington duel for control of the chest. Norrington escapes with the chest, and gives it to Cutler Beckett in exchange for a full pardon.

It is not revealed in the film why Davy Jones buried the Chest on Isla Cruces. However, the film's writers, Ted Elliott and Terry Rossio, imply in the Pirates of the Caribbean: Dead Man's Chest DVD audio commentary, that Jones chose it because it is a plague island that remains deserted.

The dilapidated church, graveyard, and mill were filmed in Vieille Case, Dominica. The beach where Norrington, Sparrow, and Turner's duel was filmed near Little Exuma in The Bahamas.

== Isla de Muerta ==
Isla de Muerta ('Island of Dead' [sic]) is a mysterious island featured in The Curse of the Black Pearl where the titular Black Pearl's pirate crew hide their looted treasure. It is revealed to be the location of the Aztec treasure that cursed Captain Barbossa and his crew to become undead.

According to Jack Sparrow, Isla de Muerta is an island that cannot be found, except by those who already know where it is hidden. From the air, the island resembles a human skull. Mysteriously shrouded in fog, the isle is surrounded by a graveyard of sunken ships; its waters swarm with hammerhead sharks and shoaling fish. The island contains a series of connected caves, which contain the crew's loot and the Chest of Cortes.

Before the events of the film, Barbossa becomes the captain of the Black Pearl by leading a mutiny against Jack Sparrow. Later, the crew finds Isla de Muerta and loots the Aztec treasure from the Chest of Cortes with no knowledge of the curse put it. By removing the golden medallions from the chest, the crew become undead and slowly lose the ability to feel physical pleasure. However, the pirates only realised this after they'd squandered away a significant portion of the medallions. In order to remove the curse, all the medallions had to be placed back in the chest along with the blood of all those who had become undead due to this curse. Due to Bill Turner being tied to a cannon and thrown overboard for not supporting Barbossa's mutiny, the blood of his son, William Turner was required to set them all free from the curse.

Barbossa, believing that Elizabeth Swann is the key to breaking his curse, kidnaps her and brings her to Isla de Muerta. Captain Sparrow uses his magical compass, which points to the thing the user wants most, to follow him. With the help of Will Turner, Elizabeth, and Jack fight against the pirates in the caves under the island. James Norrington and his men fight against Barbossa's crew in the bay just offshore. Using Will's blood, the curse is broken and Jack kills Barbossa.

In Dead Man's Chest, it's learned that the island was reclaimed by the sea, taking with it both the cursed Aztec treasure and the mountains of gold that Barbossa's crew had hoarded while they were cursed. It was with this gold that Jack Sparrow had agreed to pay his new crew.

== Isla de Pelegostos ==
Isla de Pelegostos, also known as Cannibal Island or Pelegosto Island, is a fictional Caribbean island.

In Dead Man's Chest, Bootstrap Bill, acting as Davy Jones's messenger, delivers the Black Spot to Captain Jack Sparrow, a mark indicating that his blood debt to Jones is due. To avoid the Kraken that is hunting him, guided by the Black Spot on his palm, Jack commands the crew of the Black Pearl to make landfall. They make port on Pelegosto, a tropical Caribbean island with huge cliffs and deep caves. It is inhabited by a cannibal tribe that captures the Pearl's crew and imprisons them in 2 cages made from human bone, leaving both cages hanging over a cliff. Jack, who they believe to be a god in human form, is taken to be ceremoniously eaten to "release him from his fleshy prison." Will Turner arrives and helps them escape.

Scenes set on the island were filmed on Dominica. The Pelegosto tribe's main village was built south of the island's capital, Roseau. Other scenes were filmed in Morne Trois Pitons National Park.

== London, England ==
London, sometimes referred to as London Town, is the capital city of England in Great Britain that was mentioned in the first three films and first appears in Pirates of the Caribbean: On Stranger Tides.

The Curse of the Black Pearl opens with Governor Weatherby Swann, his daughter Elizabeth, James Norrington, and Joshamee Gibbs sailing from the crossing of England to the Caribbean, with the Swanns having previously been living in London. Will Turner also lived in England until he came looking for his father after his mother's death. Elizabeth was given a dress from London, which included a corset that caused her not to breathe, which led to the circumstances in which she is kidnapped by Captain Barbossa's crew aboard the Black Pearl.

In Dead Man's Chest, Lord Cutler Beckett has Letters of Marque, with which he attempts to employ Jack Sparrow as a privateer of England. After Governor Swann attempts to help Elizabeth escape through a passage to England, Beckett also blackmails Swann for his authority and influence in London, as well as his authority to the East India Trading Company.

In At World's End, Norrington thought Governor Swann returned to England, only for Elizabeth to reveal it was a lie that Beckett told to cover up his involvement in the governor's murder.

In On Stranger Tides, London makes a physical appearance within the first part of the film. Jack Sparrow rescues his first mate, Joshamee Gibbs, from execution in the Old Bailey, only to get captured at St. James's Palace. Prior to this, Gibbs tells Jack that there was a rumor of another Jack Sparrow in London recruiting a crew in a pub called the Captain's Daughter. King George, who also heard the rumor of Sparrow in London, only for the pirate to escape. The King's Royal Guards chase Jack through London's streets until the pirate escapes to find his impostor is Angelica, Jack's former lover and daughter of Blackbeard, who then shanghais Jack into service aboard the Queen Anne's Revenge. Meanwhile, at the Execution Dock at the Tower of London, Gibbs meets Barbossa, now a privateer sporting a peg leg and having lost the Black Pearl, who are then recruited aboard HMS Providence.

== Jamaica ==
Jamaica is an island in the Caribbean Sea. It first appeared through Port Royal, a major city and harbor in the island, in The Curse of the Black Pearl and Dead Man's Chest, Undefined locations in Jamaica later appeared in At World's End and Dead Men Tell No Tales.

Elizabeth Swann arrives in Port Royal as a child, after her father Weatherby Swann is appointed governor. In the first film, Will Turner works in the town as a blacksmith's apprentice. Port Royal is attacked by the crew of the Black Pearl after Elizabeth accidentally summons the pirates. Pintel and Ragetti kidnap Elizabeth from her mansion, mistaking her for the child of Bootstrap Bill. Jack is imprisoned in the jail there, but Will Turner helps him escape.

In Dead Man's Chest, Cutler Beckett uses Port Royal as his base of operations. In At World's End, Elizabeth and her son Henry are in Jamaica waiting for the return of Will Turner and the Flying Dutchman in the "Ten years later" post-credit scene. In Dead Men Tell No Tales, Elizabeth and Henry live in a lighthouse at the beginning of the film, and the ending scenes with Will, Elizabeth, Henry and Carina.

Scenes in The Curse of the Black Pearl and Dead Man's Chest set in the harbor of Port Royal were filmed at Wallilabou Bay, Saint Vincent and the Grenadines. Today, those sets are still standing for tourist to come and visit. A replica of Fort Charles was built on the Palos Verdes Peninsula near Los Angeles, as was Governor Swann's mansion. The scenes set inside the mansion were filmed in Manhattan Beach, California.

== Rumrunner's Isle ==
Rumrunner's Isle, also known as Black Sam's Spit or Rum Island, is a small deserted island that first appears in The Curse of the Black Pearl.

While the island was never named onscreen, it was given several names behind the scenes or in other media. According to a post on Wordplay by Terry Rossio, they were asked to put a name to the "tiny sandy island" and named it for Sam, a huge Pirates fan who "works upstairs at Disney." According to Rossio, Sam was delighted, and then a year or so later, she sent this sweet e-mail: "Will you thank you guys for me? You have all made me something of an unknown immortal. In the new Monopoly game, there is a card about the marooning titled "Black Sam's Spit". I may just swoon." The name "Black Sam's Spit" was later used for the Pirates of the Caribbean Monopoly game. Jack Sparrow called the island "Rum Island" in the 2006 video game Pirates of the Caribbean: The Legend of Jack Sparrow. The name "Rumrunner's Isle" was mostly used other media, most notably Pirates of the Caribbean Online. In the non-canonical LEGO Pirates of the Caribbean: The Video Game, the island was called the "Smuggler's Den".

Before the events of The Curse of the Black Pearl, Barbossa leads a mutiny against Jack and maroons him on the island, leaving his former captain a pistol holding a single shot to commit suicide before starving to death. For the next ten years, Barbossa assumes that Jack has died; he is surprised to learn of his survival during the events of the first film. According to a story Joshamee Gibbs told Will Turner, Jack used a raft made of sea turtles to escape the island, with Jack himself adding he used his own back hair as rope; a variation of this version appears in The Legend of Jack Sparrow video game. In reality, the island was a haven for rum-runners, which Jack discovers by lying on a beach drinking their stash of liquor for three days, and barters passage off the isle when the bootleggers return. Jack relays this version to Elizabeth Swann after Barbossa maroons them on that same island. Elizabeth burns the stash of rum in order to create a signal fire, much to Jack's anger, and they are rescued by James Norrington and the HMS Dauntless.

The scenes on Rum-runner's Isle were filmed in Petit Tabac, one of five islands known as the Tobago Cays, in Saint Vincent and the Grenadines.

== Shipwreck Cove ==
Shipwreck Cove is an inlet on the fictional Shipwreck Island, which also contains Shipwreck City, appearing in At World's End. Shipwreck Cove is considered to be an impregnable fortress, well-supplied, and able to withstand nearly any siege. It serves as the meeting place for the Brethren Court, which is a gathering of the nine Pirate Lords.

The Fourth Brethren Court meet to discuss the threat of the East India Trading Company and the ways in which to combat this threat. Hector Barbossa insists that the Court must free Calypso, a sea goddess who was trapped in human form by the first Brethren Court. Sparrow and Elizabeth prefer to fight directly against the East India Trading Company. Elizabeth is elected Pirate King by the Court, and she declares war on Cutler Beckett.

The Pirate's Code is kept at Shipwreck Cove. This rulebook serves as the source of law for all pirates. Jack Sparrow's father, Captain Teague, is the Keeper of the Code.

Scenes set on Shipwreck Island were filmed in Dominica.

== Singapore ==
The fictionalised Singapore is filled with bridge-covered waterways and crude wooden buildings, and differs markedly from the actual historical Singapore. The sets for the bathhouse, harbor, and stilt houses were constructed at Universal Studios in Los Angeles.

In At World's End, Hector Barbossa and Elizabeth Swann visit Sao Feng to steal his navigational charts, which lead to World's End. They request a ship and a crew to rescue Jack Sparrow from Davy Jones's Locker. Sao Feng has captured Will Turner, who attempted to steal the charts from Feng. After a tense standoff, the pirates form a temporary alliance when they are attacked by Ian Mercer and the East India Trading Company. After a series of skirmishes and negotiations, Feng grants them a ship and a crew.

== Tortuga ==
Tortuga is an island off the northern coast of Saint-Domingue (Haiti), out of the jurisdiction of the Royal Navy and the East India Trading Company. While it remains a free port where traders can escape the high East India tariffs, it is a dangerous one where illegal transactions are common.

In the first film, Captain Jack Sparrow and Will Turner moor their stolen ship, the Interceptor, in Tortuga to recruit a crew. Their crew included Joshamee Gibbs, Anamaria, Cotton, and Marty. Here, Jack also encounters Giselle and Scarlett, with whom he has had past romantic relationships.

In Dead Man's Chest, Will goes to Tortuga to hunt for Jack Sparrow. A denizen tells Will that he saw a ship with black sails (the Black Pearl) beached on Pelegosto. Jack returns to Tortuga to try to enlist 99 unsuspecting sailors to pay off his blood debt to Davy Jones. Although he falls far short of his goal, the new crew proves useful during the final confrontation with the Kraken. Jack is reunited with Elizabeth Swann while in Tortuga and also recruits the disgraced James Norrington, who resigned his commission after losing his ship in a hurricane.

At the conclusion of At World's End, Barbossa leaves Jack and Gibbs in Tortuga by once again hijacking the Black Pearl. Gibbs remains in Tortuga with Scarlett and Giselle.

At the end of On Stranger Tides, Barbossa is in command of Blackbeard's ship, the Queen Anne's Revenge. He yells out that they will travel back to Tortuga, although this is not shown onscreen.

Scenes set in Tortuga were filmed in Wallilabou Bay, St. Vincent and the Grenadines.

== See also ==
- Locations in prequel series
- List of fictional islands
