= Will Turner =

Fictional character in the Pirates of the Caribbean film series

- Pirates of the Caribbean character
- Orlando Bloom as Will Turner (Note: Pirates of the Caribbean: At World's End (2007))
- First appearance: The Curse of the Black Pearl
- Portrayed by: Orlando Bloom (adult); Dylan Smith (adolescent)
- Voiced by: Crispin Freeman

In-universe information
- Full name: William Turner Jr.
- Gender: Male
- Occupation: Blacksmith; Captain of the Flying Dutchman (temporarily)
- Family: Bootstrap Bill Turner (father); Mrs. Turner (mother, deceased); Weatherby Swann (father-in-law, deceased)
- Spouse: Elizabeth Swann
- Children: Henry Turner (son)
- Nationality: English
- Appearance(s): The Curse of the Black Pearl; Dead Man's Chest; At World's End; Dead Men Tell No Tales

William Turner Jr. is a fictional character in the Pirates of the Caribbean films. He appears in The Curse of the Black Pearl (2003), Dead Man's Chest (2006), At World's End (2007), and Dead Men Tell No Tales (2017). He is portrayed by Orlando Bloom (and as a child by Dylan Smith in the prologue of The Curse of the Black Pearl).

William Turner is a blacksmith's apprentice working in Port Royal, Jamaica. He secretly loves the governor's daughter, Elizabeth Swann (played by Keira Knightley and Lucinda Dryzek), although he occupies a lower social class than she does. Will is the son of Bootstrap Bill Turner, and he works to free his father from service to Davy Jones. He marries Elizabeth Swann in At World's End, and they have a son named Henry (played by Dominic Scott Kay, Lewis McGowan, and Brenton Thwaites). Alongside Hector Barbossa, Turner serves as an additional foil to Jack Sparrow's character, taking the role of the straight man with his subdued, good-natured personality.

== Fictional biography ==
=== Early life ===
Will is the only child of "Bootstrap" Bill Turner (portrayed by Stellan Skarsgaard). According to Jack Sparrow, Will strongly resembles his father, both in appearance and ability. However, his father was absent during his early childhood in England. Will grew up believing his father to be a merchant seaman. Following his mother's death, Will, then about twelve years old, emigrated to Port Royal.

=== The Curse of the Black Pearl ===
Weatherby Swann and his daughter Elizabeth sail to Port Royal after Weatherby is appointed governor. Elizabeth spots Will clinging to a floating piece of a shipwreck. She discovers a gold medallion around his neck, and hides it to prevent anyone from believing that Will is a pirate. Later Elizabeth finds out the medallion is in fact Cursed Aztec Gold.

Over the next eight years, Will and Elizabeth maintain a respectful friendship, although Will conceals his romantic feelings for her. He is now a blacksmith's apprentice in Port Royal. Will has developed into a master craftsman of fine swords, although his often-drunk master usually claims credit for Will's exquisite workmanship. Will is also an exceptional, self-taught swordsman. When Jack Sparrow attempts to evade arrest, Will engages him in a duel. Sparrow outwits Will in a sword fight; Will claims Jack "cheated" by ignoring the "rules of engagement."

Will learns that his father was the pirate "Bootstrap Bill" Turner, who served aboard the Black Pearl when it was commanded by Captain Jack Sparrow. Despite Sparrow's comments that Bootstrap was "a good man," Will remains deeply conflicted over the fact that his father was a pirate. Will learns that when First Mate Barbossa and the crew mutinied and marooned Sparrow, only Bootstrap defended him. Infuriated by Bootstrap's betrayal, Barbossa and his crew had looted a chest of Aztec gold. This resulted in them becoming undead and unable to feel physical pleasure. It was only after they had thrown Bootstrap overboard that they learned how to break the curse: they needed to return all of the gold pieces, and each pirate who took the gold had to make a blood offering as a form of repayment. Because Bootstrap only had one child, Barbossa decides to track down and kidnap the child in order to lift the curse.

It is revealed that the pirate's medallion stolen by Elizabeth is one of the pieces of Aztec gold. Believing her to be the daughter of Bootstrap Bill, Barbossa kidnaps her. After Elizabeth is kidnapped, Will forms an alliance with Sparrow. He helps Sparrow escape from prison. They commandeer a ship and recruit a crew in Tortuga. They sail to Isla de Muerta, where Barbossa has taken Elizabeth. Unbeknownst to Will, Sparrow intends to use him to bargain back the Black Pearl. When Will learns his role in lifting the curse, he barters himself to Barbossa to free Elizabeth and the crew. In the end, Sparrow and Will succeed in lifting the curse; Sparrow kills Barbossa, and the pirate crew is defeated. At Sparrow's execution in Port Royal, Will declares his love for Elizabeth before attempting to rescue Sparrow from the gallows. They are quickly subdued by redcoats, but Will refuses to abandon Sparrow. Elizabeth intervenes and saves Will by declaring her love for him and vouching for Sparrow. Will is pardoned, while Sparrow escapes by falling off the rampart and into the bay where the Black Pearl awaits.

=== Dead Man's Chest ===
Will returns with the other main characters from Pirates of the Caribbean: The Curse of the Black Pearl.

For aiding Jack Sparrow's escape, Will and Elizabeth are arrested just prior to their wedding ceremony by Lord Cutler Beckett, a man made wealthy and powerful by profits from the East India Trading Company. Beckett threatens Will and Elizabeth with execution for aiding Sparrow's escape, but offers clemency if Will can find Sparrow's compass for Beckett's use. This magical compass will allow Beckett to find the heart of Davy Jones. Beckett also possesses a Letter of Marque with which he intends to recruit Jack as a privateer.

To save Elizabeth, Will hunts for Jack Sparrow and the Black Pearl. He finds the crew captive on Pelegosto, a cannibal-inhabited island. They escape, and are unexpectedly reunited with Pintel and Ragetti. Jack agrees to give Will his compass if he helps him find a key, though he has no idea what it unlocks. Jack seeks out Tia Dalma, a voodoo priestess who takes a particular interest in Will, proclaiming he has a "touch of destiny." Dalma says the key is to the Dead Man's Chest containing the heart of Davy Jones. Sparrow had once struck a bargain with Davy Jones to raise the Black Pearl from the ocean bottom and to make Jack captain for 13 years. Sparrow would then serve aboard the Dutchman for a century. When Jones attempts to collect on this deal, Jack reneges on the bargain.

The crew searches for Jones, and Will soon finds himself stranded on a wrecked vessel that Jack claimed was Jones' ghost ship, the Flying Dutchman. When the real Flying Dutchman suddenly arrives, Jack attempts to barter Will to Davy Jones to repay his blood debt, but Jones refuses, saying one soul is unequal to another. Instead, he keeps Will as a "good faith" payment and demands an additional 99 souls. Otherwise, Jack must surrender or face the Kraken.

Will, now an indentured sailor aboard Jones' ghost ship, meets his father "Bootstrap" Bill Turner. When Will challenges Davy Jones to Liar's Dice, betting his soul against the key to the Dead Man's Chest, Bootstrap joins in and purposely loses to save his son from eternal enslavement. With Bootstrap's help, Will steals the key from Jones and escapes in a longboat, vowing to one day free his father. A passing ship rescues Will, but Jones summons the Kraken to destroy it. Will survives and stows back aboard the Dutchman, now headed for Isla Cruces where the Dead Man's Chest containing Jones' heart is buried.

On Isla Cruces, Will is reunited with Elizabeth, who has escaped jail and joined Jack Sparrow's crew. Also present are Sparrow and former Commodore James Norrington, who has also joined the crew. They locate the chest. Will, Jack, and Norrington each claim the heart for their own purposes. Norrington ultimately steals the heart and the Letters of Marque, escaping just as Davy Jones' crew attacks.

The Black Pearl flees, outrunning the Flying Dutchman, but Davy Jones again summons the Kraken. Will leads the crew in temporarily fending it off, gaining enough time to abandon ship. When Elizabeth realizes that Sparrow is the Kraken's sole prey, she distracts him with a passionate kiss while handcuffing him to the mast. Unbeknownst to her, Will witnesses this and believes Elizabeth now loves Sparrow. From the longboat, the crew watches the Kraken drag the Pearl and Sparrow to Davy Jones' Locker.

Will, Elizabeth, and the crew seek refuge with Tia Dalma. Gibbs proposes a toast to their fallen captain, to which Will glumly raises his mug. Seeing Elizabeth's tears and believing she loves Sparrow, he tries comforting her. Will and the crew agree to attempt to rescue Sparrow from the Locker.

=== At World's End ===
Will is next seen in Singapore with Elizabeth, Barbossa, Tia Dalma, and the Black Pearl crew. They attempt bargain with Sao Feng, the Pirate Lord of the South China Sea, for the navigational charts leading to World's End and Davy Jones' Locker, so that they can rescue Jack Sparrow. Will had already attempted to steal the charts, but was captured. Ostensibly, the group's mission is to rescue Jack Sparrow from the Locker, but, like the others, Will has a secret motive: to retrieve the Black Pearl and free his father from Davy Jones. When Mercer and the East India Trading Company soldiers attack Sao Feng's bathhouse, Feng strikes a secret bargain with Will: Jack Sparrow in exchange for the Black Pearl. Will and the others journey to World's End on Feng's ship, sailing over an enormous waterfall into the Locker. There, they find Jack aboard the Pearl. Jack sets sail with them, although he and Barbossa dispute who is captain. Will learns that Elizabeth sacrificed Jack to the Kraken. And though he now understands why Elizabeth has been distant and despondent, she believes that her unrelenting guilt over causing Sparrow's doom is her burden alone to bear. Will tells her their relationship will not endure if they lack trust in one another and make their choices alone.

Sao Feng betrays Will in lieu of another bargain with Lord Beckett, though Beckett double-crosses Feng. Feng then offers Barbossa the Black Pearl in exchange for Elizabeth, who he mistakenly believes is the sea goddess, Calypso. Elizabeth is stunned that Will betrayed Jack Sparrow to achieve his goal. Ignoring Will, she agrees to Feng's terms in exchange for the crew's safety. Jack tosses Will in the brig, but he soon escapes. Still plotting to obtain the Pearl, Will leaves a trail of bodies for Lord Beckett to follow to Shipwreck Cove, the Brethren Court stronghold. Jack catches him, but surprisingly hands Will his magical compass before pushing him overboard. Clinging to a floating barrel, Will drifts towards Beckett's ship, Endeavour.

Will is exchanged for Jack during parley with Beckett and Davy Jones. Elizabeth tells Will she now understands the burden he bears, but having been aboard the Dutchman, she believes Bootstrap can no longer be saved, although Will disagrees. When Barbossa releases Calypso from her human form, Will tells her that Davy Jones betrayed her to the First Brethren Court. This causes her to turn her fury against both the pirates and Jones, forming a giant maelstrom.

During the maelstrom battle, Will proposes to Elizabeth, convincing her this may be their only opportunity to marry. Barbossa performs an impromptu wedding as the battle continues.

Will defends Elizabeth from Davy Jones. He stabs Jones, but Jones is unharmed. Jones mortally wounds Will. Jack, who now possesses Jones' heart guides Will's hand to stab the heart and kill Jones. Bootstrap carves out his son's heart and places it in the Dead Man's Chest. Will becomes the Flying Dutchman's immortal captain. Now under Will's command, the Flying Dutchman resurfaces, and the crew has reverted to human form. Will commands the Dutchman against the Endeavour and the combined firepower of the Black Pearl and the Flying Dutchman destroy the Endeavour, killing Cutler Beckett. The remaining armada retreats without a fight.

Will is now a psychopomp, bound to ferrying souls of those who died at sea to the next world. Will is allowed one day ashore before beginning his ten-year duty aboard the Dutchman. Bootstrap Bill decides to remain on the crew with his son. Elizabeth, a mortal, is unable to accompany them. Will spends his one day with Elizabeth on an island where they consummate their marriage. Before returning to the Dutchman at sunset, he entrusts the Dead Man's Chest containing his beating heart to her care. The Flying Dutchman disappears from the horizon amid the Green Flash.

Will returns ten years later, where he meets Elizabeth and their son, Henry. (Note: The context of the film's ending was meant to be that Will Turner's curse gets broken by Elizabeth's love, after which his task of ferrying souls aboard the Flying Dutchman would be complete and the attachment to the ship would be broken. This idea was notably hinted at in the "Story of Davy Jones and Calypso" feature in the At World's End video game adaptation. However, the idea was interpreted otherwise, as a leaflet inside the At World's End DVD said that Will was bound to the Flying Dutchman for all eternity, and the duty in full was never addressed in the film itself. The 2017 sequel Pirates of the Caribbean: Dead Men Tell No Tales focused on Will's son trying to save his father.)

=== Dead Men Tell No Tales ===
Orlando Bloom reprises his role as Will Turner in the fifth film, seen with barnacles forming upon his face, implying he's failing at the responsibilities as Captain of the Flying Dutchman. At the start of the film, Henry Turner deliberately attempts to drown himself to lure in the Dutchman, believing that he has found a way to cure his father of his curse, but Will rejects this idea, certain that there is no way to free him from his duty, asking Henry to forget him. Nine years later, Jack Sparrow recruits Henry, his small crew, a girl named Carina Smyth (who is secretly the daughter of Barbossa) and Barbossa to help him find the Trident of Poseidon, the destruction of the Trident breaking all curses imposed by the sea, including the curse that binds Will to the Dutchman. At the film's conclusion, Will is reunited with Elizabeth. In the post-credits sequence, Will Turner and Elizabeth Swann are asleep when their bedroom is entered by the shadow of an apparently resurrected Davy Jones. Will then awakens and, assuming that he was simply dreaming, goes back to sleep, not seeing a puddle of water and barnacles on the floor. Although the post-credits scene of Dead Men Tell No Tales featured Will Turner having a dream of Davy Jones seemingly resurrected from the dead, directors Joachim Rønning and Espen Sandberg confirmed the scene was meant to "pay respect to a legendary villain in the franchise" as well as be a tease or hint that it could be the "beginning of the end" or "just a dream or nightmare".

== Games/video games ==
Will Turner appears in the Pirates of the Caribbean world, Port Royal/The Caribbean, of Kingdom Hearts II and Kingdom Hearts III. In the Japanese version of Kingdom Hearts II as well as in the movies he's voiced by Daisuke Hirakawa, who was also the Japanese voice for Legolas, another famous character portrayed by Bloom. Crispin Freeman provided the voice of Will for the U.S. version of the game since Orlando Bloom was unavailable due to the filming of Dead Man's Chest and At World's End. Freeman was also the voice of Will in the video game Pirates of the Caribbean: The Legend of Jack Sparrow and in the video game adaptation of Pirates of the Caribbean: At World's End.

Will Turner appears in the video game Pirates of the Caribbean: Dead Man's Chest and in Lego Pirates of the Caribbean: The Video Game as a playable character in both games and was again voiced by Crispin Freeman. He also appears in the game Pirates of the Caribbean Online game as the character who gives the player their first sword. In the earlier versions of the game, Will urges the player to run and locate Tia Dalma after soldiers can be heard banging on his door. Will stays behind to confront them, drawing his sword. In the newer version, undead skeletons appear inside instead.

Will Turner appears as a playable character in the video game Disney Magic Kingdoms.

== Character development and portrayal ==
Described as the "traditional Errol Flynn type" of character compared to Johnny Depp's Keith Richards-inspired portrayal of Jack Sparrow, Will Turner was originally written as a prison guard who freed Sparrow to rescue Elizabeth Swann in early drafts of The Curse of the Black Pearl. Actor Orlando Bloom, who took the role of Turner after playing Legolas in Peter Jackson's The Lord of the Rings film trilogy, stated that he read the script after Geoffrey Rush, whom he was working with on Ned Kelly, suggested it to him. Tobey Maguire, Jude Law, Ewan McGregor, Ben Peyton, Christian Bale and Heath Ledger were also considered for the role, with Tom Hiddleston also auditioning for the role.

By the end of filming the Pirates trilogy in 2006 and the release of At World's End in 2007, both Bloom and Keira Knightley repeatedly stated that they were done with Pirates series, noting that there was closure for Will Turner and Elizabeth Swann in At World's End, and was quoted in saying they wanted to move on from the franchise, and so did not return for the fourth film On Stranger Tides. There was also the idea that Will's curse and his attachment to the Flying Dutchman would be broken by Elizabeth's love, as released by the At World's End video game adaption as well as comments made by screenwriters Ted Elliott and Terry Rossio on their website Wordplay.

However, Bloom made statements about returning to the Pirates franchise as early as October 2011. In 2012, Moviehole.Net reported that a "separate Disney contact" gave this one-line response: "Will Turner's story might not be finished..." While there were discussions for him to reprise his role as Will Turner by 2014, his involvement in fifth film Pirates of the Caribbean: Dead Men Tell No Tales was announced in Disney D23. Bloom alluded to his character's new "gnarly" appearance after taking over Davy Jones' post in At World's End, stating that it would be "fun to do something where I'm rumbling round the bottom of the ocean, because I won't look anything like me." Although it was announced as a supporting role, Bloom ultimately appeared as a cameo in Dead Men Tell No Tales, which was released in May 2017.
