= Pirates of the Caribbean: Armada of the Damned =

Cancelled action-adventure video game

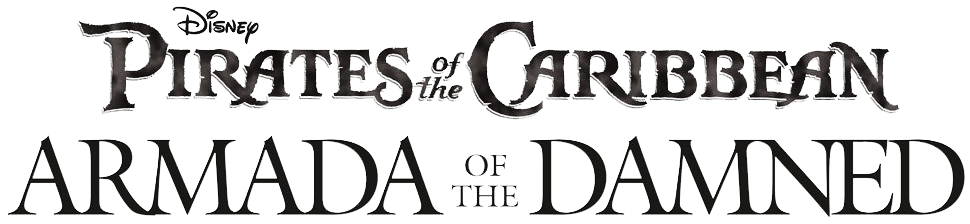
- Developer: Propaganda Games
- Publisher: Disney Interactive Studios
- Series: Pirates of the Caribbean
- Platforms: Microsoft Windows; PlayStation 3; Xbox 360
- Release: Cancelled
- Genres: Action-adventure, role-playing
- Mode: Single-player

Pirates of the Caribbean: Armada of the Damned is a cancelled action-adventure and role-playing video game that was being developed by Propaganda Games for the PlayStation 3, Xbox 360, and Microsoft Windows platforms. Originally set to be published by Disney Interactive Studios, it was the first attempt to create an open world game based on the Pirates of the Caribbean film franchise. The project was cancelled in October 2010, soon before the closure of Propaganda Games.

Set roughly ten or fifteen years before the events of The Curse of the Black Pearl, the game was to follow James Sterling, a pirate captain whose main mission was to travel across the Caribbean Sea to make a reputation for himself. Although little was unveiled about the story, it was intended to be independent from the films' main arc and include new characters. Gameplay was to have emphasized role-playing elements, including real-time combat and weapon customization.

After its announcement at 2009's Electronic Entertainment Expo, the game received positive responses from most video game journalists. Daemon Hatfield from IGN thought it "a promising action RPG", while GamesRadar praised the gameplay, comparing it to the Assassin's Creed franchise. Journalists were disappointed when Disney cancelled the game several months before its planned release date. Ubisoft, the publisher of Assassin's Creed, later released Assassin's Creed IV: Black Flag with similar role-playing gameplay elements.

== Gameplay ==
An early gameplay screenshot of Armada of the Damned, showcasing the open world environment based on the Pirates of the Caribbean universe

Armada of the Damned was conceived as an action-adventure and role-playing video game played from a third-person perspective and set in an open world environment based on the Pirates of the Caribbean universe. The player was to take the role of James Sterling, a pirate captain whose main mission was to travel across the Caribbean Sea and make a reputation for himself. Some of Sterling's features could be directly customized by the player, although Armada of the Damned was centered on a choice system that would affect the character's appearance, personality, weapons, attacks, quests, and story developments.

Although most of the character's specifications could be customized, some elements were to be determined by the game's two character types, Legendary and Dreaded. Choosing a type at the beginning of the game affected several gameplay and story elements. Each character type had unique features that shaped the way the game was experienced, including how the environment and non-playable characters interacted with the player.

Combat in Armada of the Damned was split between land and sea. Sterling had a light and a heavy attack, which could be combined to create combos that increased the damage he inflicted. Correct timing lead to a bonus attack at the end of the combo that improved its strength. Sterling could also curse his opponents. The curse was a spell that weakened all surrounding enemies when it was used as a finishing move. All attacks, special moves, and combinations varied depending on the pirate type chosen and could be upgraded at will.

In the game, the player was given a customizable ship named the Nemesis, commanded by Sterling and his crew. The player's choices in the game would determine the crew they could hire, which in turn affected the ship's attributes. The vessel could be used to explore the Caribbean Sea and battle other crafts. During combat, the player could maneuver the ship, fire the cannons, or board the enemy vessel for hand-to-hand combat. If the enemy craft was boarded and the enemy crew was eliminated, the player received more loot than if it was destroyed. Loot salvaged in these battles could be sold in markets.

== Plot ==
Little information was revealed about Armada of the Damned's plot. Sterling had no connection with the film series' characters and story arcs. The game and the films shared the same universe, but the former was to take place before the events of the latter. Sterling, raised in a poor family, was a young adventurer with dreams of fame and fortune who decided to become a pirate. Although he was killed on his first voyage, Sterling was revived by supernatural forces which gave him a second chance. After these events, the player had the option to follow two paths: become either a Legendary or a Dreaded pirate. On the Legendary path, the player would be a well-respected pirate who acted in good faith. On the Dreaded path, the player would be mysterious and feared.

== Development ==
Who doesn't want to be a pirate? I think with the pirates adventure you're able to live that fantasy of being just a little bit lawless and I think that really is appealing to everybody.

—Dan Tudge, Propaganda Games' vice president and general manager.

Propaganda Games, a studio founded in 2005 and owned by Disney Interactive Studios, developed Armada of the Damned. The studio was established by former employees of EA Canada and focused on the development of action-adventure games for Disney. Propaganda's first game, Turok (2008), became a commercial success, selling more than one million copies. After Turok's release, the studio began working on a project for the Pirates of the Caribbean franchise. Propaganda's vice president and general manager Dan Tudge said that this was because "it is a universe fans will be dying to explore". The studio revealed that they worked on several scripts to improve the gameplay focus. Armada of the Damned included an interactive choice system to shape the game, making choices an important feature.

According to game director Alex Peters, Armada of the Damned's characters were developed unattached from those that appear in the film series. "We were very clear that we didn't want to be associated with being a movie game", he commented. This desire led to the creation of James Sterling, a character that would fit the studio's needs and feel familiar to the characters featured in the films. An original music score was written for Armada of the Damned, while the musical themes from the films were "treated tastefully and only used on occasion." After the game's cancellation, the score was used in Lego Pirates of the Caribbean: The Video Game, which was released in 2011.

== Cancellation ==
During Armada of the Damned's development, Propaganda Games also worked on Tron: Evolution, which was released in December 2010. In October 2010, Disney Interactive Studios announced that Armada of the Damned's development team would be laid off as part of a restructuring program. However, Propaganda would finish development of Tron: Evolution and its post-launch downloadable content.

The restructuring reduced the studio's staff by more than 100 people and led to the cancellation of Armada of the Damned. The remaining development team worked to finish Tron: Evolution, whose team was also affected by the lay offs. However, after the game failed to attain critical or commercial success, Disney cancelled its planned downloadable content and closed Propaganda Games.

== Reception ==
After its announcement at 2009's Electronic Entertainment Expo, Armada of the Damned was met with positive reactions from most video game journalists. Daemon Hatfield from IGN named it "a promising action RPG," elaborating that "even though Armada of the Damned uses the Pirates of the Caribbean license ... [it] is its own game, an adventure that lets players create their own pirate and wander the seas of the Caribbean seeking fame and fortune." Chris Antista from GamesRadar praised its gameplay, comparing it with Assassin’s Creed. He stated that "the game has spectacularly preserved the spirit of the films, and they’ve done it without parasitically clinging to moments you’ve already seen on the big screen."

An editor from the Official Xbox Magazine speculated that since the first Pirates of the Caribbean film was "followed by a progressive descent into mediocrity and Krakens with twirly tentacles in the sequels, any game that's set before the first movie is likely to be amazing." Matt Miller from Game Informer was impressed with the game, praising its Mass Effect-like speech and combat systems. He commented that "we didn't go into our meeting for Pirates with great expectations, but came out pleasantly amazed at the potential of the game." Joystiq's Mike Schramm compared the game to Fable, noting that "what is there looks good – the combat was solid, if a little shallow, and the graphics and polish are well on their way."

Journalists expressed disappointment when Disney reduced the staff at Propaganda Games and cancelled development of the game several months before its planned release date. IGN's Ryan Clements stated that "it's a shame that [Armada of the Damned's] potential won't be realized at this point in time." Justin Towell, writing for GamesRadar, was frustrated by Disney's decision: "It makes no sense to completely abandon work on a game that's clearly not that far off completion." Game Informer's Jeff Marchiafava also expressed sadness about the cancellation, saying "What kind of noise does a depressed pirate make? Because we would totally be making that noise right now."
