= Wordplay (website) =

American screenwriting website

- Screenshot Homepage of Wordplay as of October 2026.
- Website type: Film education
- Founders: Ted Elliott; Terry Rossio
- Website: wordplayer.com
- Launched: May 31, 1997; 29 years ago

Wordplay is a film website. It was founded on May 31, 1997, created by screenwriters Ted Elliott and Terry Rossio, along with Wordplay's webmaster Ann Garretson. It was one of the first websites run by professional film writers with the goal of sharing the techniques of their craft with beginner screenwriters.

== History ==
The duo has confounded Wordplay, a film website that helps fellow screenwriters perfect their craft.

In 1995, Wordplay originally began as a weekly column, and was later founded on May 31, 1997. At the time, Ted Elliott and Terry Rossio had only four produced film credits, of which only Disney's Aladdin was a commercial and critical success. Since then, the pair had received an Oscar nomination and written several of the following decade's top-grossing films (including DreamWorks's Shrek), making them one of Hollywood's most successful writer teams. They also manage to find the time for continued participation in the Wordplay website.

The site features columns by Rossio (and occasionally Elliott) on the business and craft of screenwriting; guest columns by industry professionals such as Frank Darabont, Walter Parkes, Zak Penn and Stephen King; and a discussion board open to industry professionals and aspiring writers alike. Notable participants in the discussion board have included Charles Edward Pogue, Josh Olson, and Cheryl Heuton. There are also screenplays (online & downloadable) available from such films like Little Monsters, Godzilla, The Mask of Zorro, and Déjà Vu as well as unproduced projects like Sandman.

Wordplay also had content related to Ted Elliott and Terry Rossio's involvement in the Pirates of the Caribbean series, notably The Curse of the Black Pearl, Dead Man's Chest, At World's End, On Stranger Tides, and Dead Men Tell No Tales. Rossio's first "Tales from the Set" post, titled "On Location" on April 30, 2003, recounted how Johnny Depp presented Jack Sparrow's final line in The Curse of the Black Pearl "Bring me that horizon!" on the day the scene was filmed; a story later published in the 2007 book Bring Me That Horizon: The Making of Pirates of the Caribbean by production unit publicist Michael Singer. Elliott and Rossio both answered questions about the films as early as July 2003, though most notably provided an explanation for the fate of Will Turner and Elizabeth Swann after At World's End. Rossio had written "Tales from the Set" blog entries which chronicled details from the set as well as provided behind the scenes or personal experiences. Some of these posts in blogs and forums were reported, such as debunking internet rumors online. When Rossio's 2012 script draft for Dead Men Tell No Tales was discarded, the writer stated in a column on Wordplay that a major reason was its use of a female villain, which made actor Johnny Depp "worried that it would be redundant to Dark Shadows, which also featured a female villain." Following the film's theatrical release in 2017, written by Jeff Nathanson, Terry Rossio released his unproduced screenplay, along with additional information in extensive footnotes, by July 2023.

Wordplay was mentioned and described as a great series of articles on writing and the industry in Harvardwood and screenwriting tools links in WGAW Registry. American screenwriter and director John August said that Terry Rossio started doing Wordplay even before he was doing johnaugust.com and they were both sort of people who were offering advice to aspiring screenwriters online. Disney writer Ricky Roxburgh, who saw Rossio as his personal idol, called Wordplay as one of his favorite online screenwriting resources, "It's got samples of his outlines of things that he's pitched. He talks about everything from finding your way in, to working with executives, to thinking about your script in different ways that you might not be thinking of. He's a talented writer and a really successful writer."
