= Pirates of the Caribbean Online =

2007 multiplayer online video game

- Developers: Disney Online; SilverTree Media (Note: Additional post-release content developed by Schell Games.)
- Publisher: Disney Online
- Series: Pirates of the Caribbean
- Platforms: Microsoft Windows; Mac OS X
- Release: WW: October 31, 2007
- Genre: Massively multiplayer online role-playing
- Mode: Multiplayer

Pirates of the Caribbean Online was a massively multiplayer online role-playing video game based on the Pirates of the Caribbean franchise. It was developed and published by Disney Online, in conjunction with SilverTree Media, for Microsoft Windows and Mac OS X, with additional post-release content developed by Schell Games. The game was first announced by The Walt Disney Company in April 2005 and was originally meant to coincide with the release of Pirates of the Caribbean: Dead Man's Chest in 2006, but its release was delayed multiple times. The 3D game went through two beta testing phases during 2007, and it was officially released in October of that year. Pirates of the Caribbean Online was closed on September 19, 2013.

== Gameplay ==
Pirates of the Caribbean Online was a virtual world set in the Pirates of the Caribbean universe and featured prominent characters from the films, such as Jack Sparrow, Hector Barbossa, Joshamee Gibbs, Will Turner, and Elizabeth Swann. Davy Jones never had any sort of in-game appearance other than a cameo appearance in one of the game's trailers, albeit his crew appeared as NPC enemies. An undead captain, Jolly Roger, served as the game's main villainous antagonist who plotted to seek vengeance against Jack Sparrow and all of piracy.

The game centered around the player creating their own pirate character while being confronted by Jack Sparrow at the "Rambleshack". Upon completing the tutorial, obtaining their first cutlass from Will Turner, and being introduced to Jolly Roger, the player would venture off into the virtual world to complete all sorts of in-game quests for various rewards such as teleport access to certain islands (Port Royal, Tortuga, Padres del Fuego, Cuba, and Raven's Cove), cosmetics, and weapons. There were main "story quests" that incorporated elements of the game's lore and required completion for players to advance. Two expansions with story quests were planned to expand the game's lore, but they were ultimately cancelled during development.

Alongside questing, one major feature was sailing, where a player could launch their ship in order to sail to different islands or battle against ship enemies. Players could also loot on land and sea, play minigames such as card games, fishing, potion brewing, and cannon defense, and engage in several forms of PvP combat.

== Closure ==
On August 20, 2013, Disney announced that Pirates of the Caribbean Online would close on September 19 of the same year. Every player was offered membership, seasonal in-game events occurred, and codes for exclusive in-game items were distributed for the remainder of the game's lifespan prior to the closing announcement.

Two years after Pirates of the Caribbean Online closed, an unofficial free-to-play fan revival of the game titled The Legend of Pirates Online, similar to that of Toontown Rewritten, which is a fan revival of Toontown Online, was announced by community members known as "The TLOPO Crew" on March 23, 2015. The game is currently in an "open beta" phase.

== Reception ==
Reception

Aggregate score
Aggregator	Score
Metacritic	60/100

Review scores
Publication	Score
GameRevolution	C+
GameZone	7.0/10
X-Play	2/5
Game Industry News	4.5/5

Pirates of the Caribbean Online received "mixed or average" reviews, holding an aggregated score of 60/100 based on seven critic reviews on Metacritic.

=== Awards ===
Year	Association	Award	Result	Ref
2008	Game Industry News	Game of the Year	Nominated	
2008	Game Industry News	Online Game of the Year	Won	
2008	Parents' Choice Award	Gold Award	Won	
2008	Web Marketing Association	Outstanding Achievement in Web Development	Won	
2008	The Webby Awards	Web / Games	Nominated	
2009	The Webby Awards	Web / Games	Nominated	
