= Parley =

Type of diplomatic meeting held between enemies

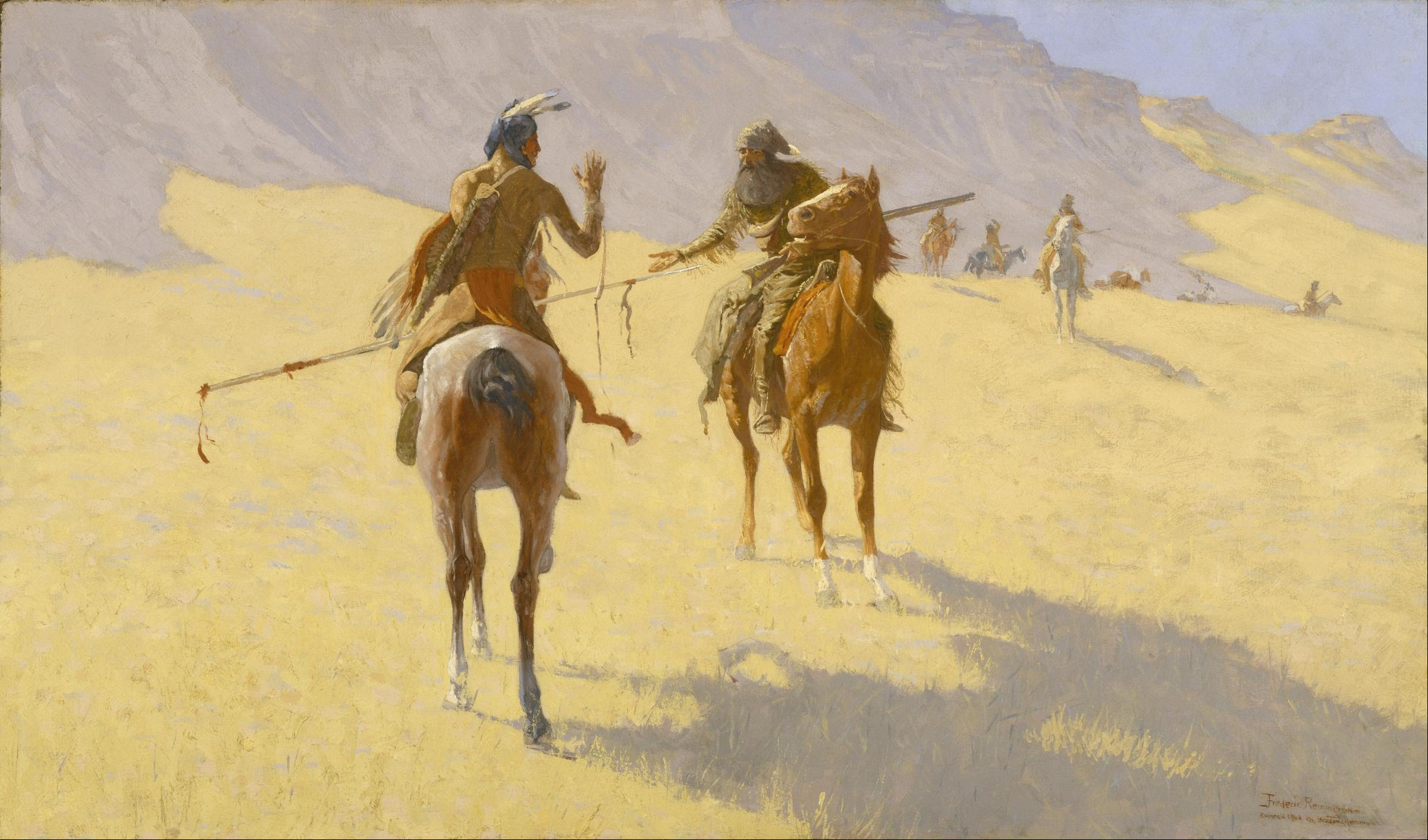
The Parley by Frederic Remington, 1903, depicting a settler parleying with a Native American.

A parley (from French: parler – "to speak") is a discussion or conference, especially one designed to end an argument or hostilities between two groups of people. As a verb, the term can be used in both past and present tense; in present tense the term is referred to as parleying. In some cases, opposing parties would signal their intent to invoke parley by using a white flag, however the use of a white flag to invoke or request parley is not considered mandatory.

The term parley has been used to refer to numerous high-profile meetings of the 20th century, including the London and Paris Conferences held in 1954 to determine the status of West Germany.

== In popular culture ==
Below are some examples where a parley is a significant element of the plot.

- The Last of the Mohicans features a scene depicting a parley at the end of the siege of Fort William Henry.
- In the Pirates of the Caribbean series, parley is a plot device introduced in the first film, Pirates of the Caribbean: The Curse of the Black Pearl (2003). Captain Barbossa explained that the parley is not a rule, as Elizabeth (the leading lady of the film) assumed, but merely a "guideline" adhered to by pirates.
- In the 2013 film Riddick, Riddick and the mercenaries are forced to parley to reach an agreement so both sides could escape an impending storm. The mercenaries violate the spirit of parley by capturing Riddick and killing his dog.
- In the 2017 Fear the Walking Dead episode, "The Unveiling", Jake Otto and Chief Qaletaqa Walker agree to parley, in order to spare bloodshed in their escalating feud over land. However, Madison Clark goads Troy Otto to violate the parley rules of engagement by leading a surreptitious "rescue mission" to extract Alicia from the Black Hat reservation. The rescuers are discovered, blood is shed, and the temporary truce is broken.
- In the 2019 film John Wick: Chapter 3 – Parabellum, the climax is a parley between the main characters on how to settle the plot's feud.
- In the film The Warriors during the midpoint a segment of the Warriors gang encounter a sub-par outfit called The Orphans. The Orphans are illegitimate to the point of not even being on the map. The supposed war chief of the orphans says to Swan "No permits? No parley?".
- In the HBO drama The Wire, one of the characters, Proposition Joe, uses parley (sitting down and talking) to unite warring heroin dealing factions in Baltimore.
