= Elizabeth Swann =

Fictional character in the Pirates of the Caribbean film series

- Pirates of the Caribbean character
- Keira Knightley as Elizabeth Swann (Note: Promotional image for Pirates of the Caribbean: At World's End (2007))
- First appearance: The Curse of the Black Pearl (2003)
- Portrayed by: Keira Knightley (Note: The Curse of the Black Pearl Dead Man's Chest At World's End Dead Men Tell No Tales); Lucinda Dryzek (Note: The Curse of the Black Pearl (child))
- Voiced by: Eliza Schneider (Note: Various video games)

In-universe information
- Occupation: Pirate
- Family: Weatherby Swann (father)
- Spouse: Will Turner
- Children: Henry Turner (son)

Elizabeth Swann is a fictional character in the Pirates of the Caribbean film series. She appears in The Curse of the Black Pearl (2003), Dead Man's Chest (2006), At World's End (2007) and Dead Men Tell No Tales (2017). She is portrayed by Keira Knightley in all four films. Elizabeth is the daughter of Weatherby Swann, the wife of Will Turner and the mother of Henry Turner.

== Appearances ==
=== Film series ===
==== The Curse of the Black Pearl ====
Elizabeth Swann was introduced at the beginning of the original 2003 film, Pirates of the Caribbean: The Curse of the Black Pearl. She appears as a young girl at sea with her father, Governor Weatherby Swann. She notices a boy floating in the water, and the crew hauls him aboard the ship. He is identified as Will Turner. Eight years later, Elizabeth is of a marriageable age. Her father, the governor of Port Royal, wants her to marry Commodore James Norrington, a Royal Navy officer. During Norrington's marriage proposal, Elizabeth is suffocated by her tightly laced corset and faints, falling into the bay.

She is rescued by the notorious pirate Jack Sparrow, newly arrived in Port Royal to commandeer a ship. Despite Sparrow's gallant act and against Elizabeth's protests, he is promptly jailed and sentenced to hang. That night, Port Royal is raided by the Black Pearl, a pirate ship. When Elizabeth is taken hostage by the pirates, they discover that she possesses a gold medallion that she took from Will after his rescue years ago. Elizabeth strikes a deal with the captain of the ship, Hector Barbossa: He will leave Port Royal in exchange for the medallion. At first Barbossa agrees, but then keeps Elizabeth captive after she identifies herself as "Elizabeth Turner". He believes that, as a Turner, her blood can break a curse that has transformed his crew into immortal zombies.

Will frees Sparrow from prison, and together they pursue Barbossa. After a series of adventures, Barbossa takes Will captive and maroons Elizabeth and Sparrow on a deserted island. Elizabeth creates a towering smoke column, which is spotted by Norrington. Hoping to rescue Will, Elizabeth convinces Norrington to attack Barbossa's crew on Isla de Muerta by impulsively accepting his marriage proposal. Once on the island, Elizabeth frees Sparrow's crew, believing they will rescue Will and Sparrow. Instead, they commandeer the Black Pearl and set sail, leaving Elizabeth to rescue Will and Sparrow by herself. Elizabeth, Will and Sparrow fight Barbossa and his crew, and Sparrow shoots Barbossa as the curse is lifted. He falls dead, and his now-mortal crewmates surrender to Norrington. Back in Port Royal, Will frees Sparrow from execution. Elizabeth and Will proclaim their love for each other, and Norrington concedes Elizabeth's hand to Will.

==== Dead Man's Chest ====
Pirates of the Caribbean: Dead Man's Chest (2006) takes place one year after The Curse of the Black Pearl. At the beginning of the film, Lord Cutler Beckett notifies Elizabeth and Will that they have been sentenced to death for helping Sparrow escape execution. Beckett, who is an agent of the East India Trading Company, offers clemency if Will agrees to search for Sparrow and obtain his magical compass. Will finds Sparrow and the Black Pearl crew on Isla de Pelegostos. They are hiding from the Kraken, a leviathan controlled by the mythical captain Davy Jones.

Elizabeth escapes from prison and discovers that Beckett is not pardoning her or Will. She confronts Beckett and forces him to free Will. She then travels to Tortuga, where she encounters Sparrow attempting to pay off a debt to Jones. Also present is Norrington, who tries to shoot Sparrow. In the ensuing brawl, Elizabeth knocks out Norrington to save him. Sparrow claims Will was forced into joining Jones's crew, but says Elizabeth can save him by finding the Dead Man's Chest, which contains Jones's beating heart.

Elizabeth, Sparrow, Norrington and Will arrive on Isla Cruces and locate the Chest. A conflict erupts, and Norrington flees with Jones's heart. Jones pursues the Black Pearl, and Elizabeth realizes that Sparrow is the Kraken's sole target. She distracts him with a kiss while handcuffing him to the mast, and tells the others that he willingly stayed behind to aid their escape. After witnessing the kiss, Will believes that Elizabeth loves Sparrow. The Kraken then drags Sparrow into Davy Jones's Locker as the others watch from the longboat. Elizabeth is wracked by guilt for sacrificing Sparrow, which prompts the voodoo priestess Tia Dalma to suggest they rescue Sparrow with the help of Captain Barbossa, who is alive once again.

==== At World's End ====
Elizabeth returns in the third film in the series, Pirates of the Caribbean: At World's End (2007). She joins Will, Barbossa, Tia Dalma, and Sparrow's crew on a mission to rescue Sparrow from Davy Jones's Locker. Elizabeth's anguish over sacrificing Sparrow torments her, and during the voyage she distances herself from Will. She eventually reveals to him that she caused Sparrow's demise, and he is hurt that she kept a secret from him. Elizabeth claims that Will cannot trust her, and abruptly leaves. In the Locker, Elizabeth discovers that her father was murdered by Beckett, and she vows to avenge his death.

The dying pirate captain Sao Feng names Elizabeth the Pirate Lord of the South China Sea, mistakenly believing she is the sea goddess Calypso. Elizabeth and her new crew are taken prisoner aboard the Flying Dutchman, where she is reunited with Norrington. Elizabeth accuses him of complicity in her father's murder, but Norrington denies knowing anything about his death. That night, Norrington frees Elizabeth and her crew.

Elizabeth attends a meeting of pirate lords, who discuss how to oppose Beckett and the East India Trading Company. Elizabeth favors fighting, while others suggest hiding in Shipwreck Cove. Elizabeth is elected Pirate King and declares war. As Beckett's fleet approaches, Elizabeth refuses to retreat and delivers a rousing speech. During the ensuing battle, Will proposes to Elizabeth, who orders Barbossa to marry them amidst the fighting. Davy Jones fatally wounds Will, and Sparrow forces the grief-stricken Elizabeth to escape with him as Will and the Dutchman are sucked into a whirlpool. The ship quickly resurfaces, however, with a resurrected Will at the helm. With the help of Will and his crew, the pirates kill Beckett and destroy his ship. Later, Elizabeth and Will travel to a nearby island and conceive their son, Henry Turner.

==== Dead Men Tell No Tales ====
In Pirates of the Caribbean: Dead Men Tell No Tales (2017), Henry—the son of Elizabeth and Will—searches for the Trident of Poseidon with Sparrow. The eventual destruction of the Trident frees Will from the curse that binds him to the Flying Dutchman, and Elizabeth and Will reunite. In the post-credits sequence, Will dreams that their bedroom is entered by the shadow of a resurrected Davy Jones.

=== Video games ===
Elizabeth is voiced by Eliza Schneider in the video games Kingdom Hearts II, Kingdom Hearts III, The Legend of Jack Sparrow, Disney Speedstorm, and the video game adaptations of Dead Man's Chest and At World's End. Elizabeth also appears in Pirates of the Caribbean Online, Lego Pirates of the Caribbean: The Video Game, Disney Magic Kingdoms and Fortnite Battle Royale. and Disney Speedstorm.

== Portrayal ==
Keira Knightley portrays Elizabeth in all four films in which the character appears. According to a presskit from The Curse of the Black Pearl, the producers cast her because she had an "indescribable quality ... reminiscent of motion picture stars from Hollywood's heyday." Knightley's co-star Johnny Depp described her approach to playing Elizabeth: "Keira steps into the ring and attacks ... Her work is right on the money, totally professional ... I was very impressed."

Knightley has described Elizabeth as "a 21st century girl trapped in an 18th century world" who begins the film as a damsel in distress and then "kicks butt". Knightley was disappointed that Elizabeth does not carry a sword in Curse of the Black Pearl. When filming At World's End, Knightley was glad to shed the elaborate dresses—which were uncomfortably hot—and wear only pirate clothing. During production of Dead Man's Chest and At World's End, Knightley wore wigs when playing Elizabeth. During Curse of the Black Pearl, makeup was used to make Knightley's breasts appear larger.

By the end of production of the Pirates trilogy in 2006 and the release of At World's End in 2007, it was reported that Knightley did not want to participate in any further sequels. She and her co-star Orlando Bloom claimed there was narrative closure for their characters, Will and Elizabeth, in At World's End, and they therefore did not return for the fourth film, On Stranger Tides. (Note: Attributed to multiple references:) However, there were reports suggesting that Knightley would return for the fifth film, Dead Men Tell No Tales, due to the return of Will and the plot's focus on Will and Elizabeth's son Henry. Once the film was shown to test audiences, the filmmakers felt pressure to bring back both Bloom and Knightley. To ensure that Knightley was available, a one-day shoot was scheduled in London, where she was working, and it was planned around her schedule. (Note: Attributed to multiple references:)

Knightley said she is not planning to appear in any additional Pirates of the Caribbean films because they take a long time to shoot. In a 2023 interview, she admitted that she felt "constrained" and "caged" in the film industry after her breakout performance as Elizabeth in The Curse of the Black Pearl. She felt that Elizabeth was perceived as an object of desire and she felt confined to that type of role in future films. She added that she has intentionally sought out different types of roles.
