= Pirates of the Caribbean: The Curse of the Black Pearl (video game) =

2003 video game

- Developer: Pocket Studios
- Publisher: TDK Mediactive
- Composer: Allister Brimble
- Platform: Game Boy Advance
- Release: NA: June 19, 2003; UK: October 24, 2003
- Genre: Action-adventure
- Mode: Single-player

Pirates of the Caribbean: The Curse of the Black Pearl is a video game prequel to the film of the same name, developed by British company Pocket Studios and released for Game Boy Advance in 2003.

== Plot ==
The game's plot takes place before the first film and follows Jack Sparrow in his adventures immediately after being marooned by Hector Barbossa on Rumrunner's Isle. He collects pieces of Barbossa's chart and pieces of Aztec gold so he can get revenge. While doing that, he searches for buried gold, steals ships, sacks Hispaniola, and does favors for the governor of Port Royal.

== Gameplay ==
The player plays as Captain Jack Sparrow and cannot save their progress, instead the player must keep track of passwords that appear at the end of each level. The game is divided into separate missions. The two main aspects of the game are the land based adventure play and maneuvering a ship and having battles with other ships. The game does not follow the plot of the film of the same name but some characters and locations (like Port Royal) appear in the game.

== Reception ==
Reception

Aggregate score
Aggregator	Score
Metacritic	49/100

Review scores
Publication	Score
Game Informer	5.5/10
GameSpot	3.8/10
IGN	5.5/10
Nintendo Power	3.1/5
Nintendo World Report	4/10
NintenDojo	7.2/10
Nintendophiles	6.5/10

The game received "mixed or average reviews" according to video game review aggregator Metacritic. GameSpot concluded in their review, "Simply put, the bare minimum has been put into Pirates of the Caribbean." IGN noted "the battle between pirate vs. pirate in Pirates of the Caribbean is a basic and tedious button-masher".
