= Pirates of the Caribbean: Dead Man's Chest (video game) =

2006 video game

- Developers: Griptonite Games (PSP); Amaze Entertainment (GBA, DS); Floodgate Entertainment (mobile)
- Publisher: Buena Vista Games (Note: Mobile version published by the Disney Mobile publishing label.)
- Platforms: PlayStation Portable; Nintendo DS; Game Boy Advance; Mobile phone
- Release: NA: June 27, 2006; EU: July 7, 2006; AU: July 13, 2006
- Genre: Action-adventure
- Modes: Single-player, multiplayer

Pirates of the Caribbean: Dead Man's Chest is a 2006 action-adventure game based on the film of the same name developed by Griptonite Games and Amaze Entertainment for the Game Boy Advance, Nintendo DS, PlayStation Portable, and mobile phones.

== Gameplay ==
The game incorporates role playing elements where Jack Sparrow and the Black Pearl can be customized. Dead Man's Chest is played on land and sea, on land the player must defeat enemies, search for treasure or for comrades, items, rumors and boat enhancements can be bought from towns. When on sea the player must travel from one island to another to play through the story or to explore the world. Sea battles can take place when the Black Pearl is steered towards other boats, during these battles the cannons are fired to damage the opposing ship and once when it has been sufficiently damaged, it's possible to board the burning ship and plunder it for food, grog and even treasures. The GBA version's gameplay is similar to the Castlevania game engine.

== Reception ==
Reception

Aggregate scores
Aggregator	Score
GameRankings	(GBA) 74.30% (DS) 63.54% (PSP) 52.71%
Metacritic	(GBA) 70/100 (DS) 63/100 (PSP) 52/100

Review scores
Publication	Score
Eurogamer	2/10
Game Informer	3/10
GameRevolution	C−
GameSpot	(GBA) 6.7/10 (PSP) 6.6/10 (DS) 5.9/10
GameSpy	2/5
IGN	(Mobile) 7.9/10 (GBA) 7/10; 6/10
Nintendo Power	(GBA) 7.5/10 (DS) 6/10
Official U.S. PlayStation Magazine	5/10
PALGN	4/10
VideoGamer.com	4/10
Detroit Free Press	3/4
The Sydney Morning Herald	2/5

The game was met with mixed reception upon release. GameRankings and Metacritic gave it a score of 74.30% and 70 out of 100 for the Game Boy Advance version; 63.54% and 63 out of 100 for the DS version; and 52.71% and 52 out of 100 for the PSP version.

== See also ==
- Pirates of the Caribbean: The Legend of Jack Sparrow
- Pirates of the Caribbean video games
