= Pirates of the Caribbean: At World's End =

2007 film by Gore Verbinski

- Theatrical release poster
- Directed by: Gore Verbinski
- Written by: Ted Elliott; Terry Rossio
- Based on: Characters by; Ted Elliott; Terry Rossio; Stuart Beattie; Jay Wolpert; Walt Disney's Pirates of the Caribbean
- Produced by: Jerry Bruckheimer
- Starring: Johnny Depp; Orlando Bloom; Keira Knightley; Stellan Skarsgård; Bill Nighy; Chow Yun-fat; Geoffrey Rush; Jack Davenport; Kevin R. McNally; Jonathan Pryce
- Cinematography: Dariusz Wolski
- Edited by: Craig Wood; Stephen Rivkin
- Music by: Hans Zimmer
- Production companies: Walt Disney Pictures; Jerry Bruckheimer Films
- Distributed by: Buena Vista Pictures Distribution
- Release dates: May 19, 2007 (Disneyland Resort); May 25, 2007 (United States)
- Running time: 168 minutes
- Country: United States
- Language: English
- Budget: $300 million
- Box office: $963.4 million

Pirates of the Caribbean: At World's End is a 2007 American swashbuckler film directed by Gore Verbinski, produced by Jerry Bruckheimer, and written by Ted Elliott and Terry Rossio. The direct sequel to Pirates of the Caribbean: Dead Man's Chest (2006), it is the third installment in the Pirates of the Caribbean film series, and follows an urgent quest to locate and save Captain Jack Sparrow (Johnny Depp), trapped on a sea of sand in Davy Jones' Locker, and convene the Brethren Court in a war against the East India Trading Company. In an uneasy alliance, Will Turner (Orlando Bloom), Elizabeth Swann (Keira Knightley), Hector Barbossa (Geoffrey Rush), and the Black Pearl crew rescue Jack and prepare to fight Lord Cutler Beckett, who controls Davy Jones and the Flying Dutchman.

Two sequels to Pirates of the Caribbean: The Curse of the Black Pearl were conceived in 2004, with Elliott and Rossio developing a story arc that would span both films. The film was shot in two shoots during 2005 and 2006, the former of which was released as Dead Man's Chest. This also marks the final film of the series to be directed by Verbinski. With a production budget of US$300 million, it was the most expensive film ever made at the time of its release.

At World's End premiered at the Disneyland Resort on May 19, 2007, then theatrically released in the United States on May 25. The film received mixed reviews from critics, but was the highest-grossing film of 2007, bringing in over $963 million. It was nominated at the 80th Academy Awards for Best Makeup and Best Visual Effects, and won Favorite Movie Actor for Depp at the 2008 Kids' Choice Awards. A standalone sequel, On Stranger Tides, was released in 2011. Dead Men Tell No Tales, released in 2017, followed as a direct continuation of At World's End.

== Plot ==
Now in control of the oceans, Lord Cutler Beckett executes anyone associated with piracy in Port Royal and orders Davy Jones to destroy all pirate ships, also forcing him to kill the Kraken. Condemned prisoners sing 'Hoist the Colours' to compel nine Pirate Lords from around the world to convene at Shipwreck Cove to hold the Brethren Court and address the threat Beckett poses. Because Pirate Lord Jack Sparrow never named a successor before being dragged to Davy Jones' Locker, (Note: As depicted in Pirates of the Caribbean: Dead Man's Chest) Hector Barbossa, Will Turner, Elizabeth Swann, Tia Dalma, and the surviving crew of the Black Pearl plot to rescue him. In Singapore, the crew meet Pirate Lord Sao Feng, who owns navigational charts to the Locker before they are attacked by the East India Trading Company. During the battle, Will secretly promises to give Jack to Feng in return for the Pearl, intending to use it to rescue his father "Bootstrap Bill" Turner from the Flying Dutchman.

The crew crosses over into the Locker, rescues Jack and recovers the Pearl. While departing, they encounter boats of dead souls, including Elizabeth's father Governor Swann, executed by Beckett. The goddess Calypso charged Davy Jones with guiding the souls of those who died at sea to the next world; every ten years he could come ashore to be with the woman he loved, but after his lover never arrived to meet him, Jones corrupted his purpose and cursed himself to become a monster. Whoever kills Jones by stabbing his disembodied heart must become the Dutchman's captain.

Returning to the living world, the Pearl stops at an island for fresh water, but the crew is attacked by Sao Feng and Beckett's men. As Jack secretly negotiates his freedom with Beckett, Elizabeth is handed over to Feng, who believes she is Calypso, while the rest of the crew make for Shipwreck Cove aboard the Pearl. Jack throws Will off the ship as part of a plan to seize control of the Dutchman. Sao Feng tells Elizabeth that the first Brethren Court bound Calypso in human form after her lover, Davy Jones, betrayed her; Feng plans to release her to defeat Beckett. Feng is wounded in an attack by Jones, appointing Elizabeth his successor as Pirate Lord before dying. Elizabeth and the crew are locked in the brig of the Dutchman, where she finds Bootstrap Bill losing himself to the Dutchman's curse. Admiral James Norrington frees Elizabeth and her crew from the Dutchman, but is killed by a crazed Bootstrap Bill.

Will is rescued by Beckett and informs Jones of Jack's escape from the Locker, learning in the process that Jones enabled the first Court to imprison Calypso, revealed to be Tia Dalma. The Pearl arrives at Shipwreck Cove, where Barbossa attempts to persuade the Brethren Court to release Calypso while Elizabeth demands they fight back against Beckett. The Keeper of the Code, Captain Teague, (Note: While implied in the film, Teague was explicitly confirmed to be Jack Sparrow's father in Pirates of the Caribbean: On Stranger Tides (2011).) informs the Court that only an elected Pirate King can declare war. To avoid a stalemate, Jack votes for Elizabeth, making her King. Elizabeth, Jack, Barbossa, Beckett, Jones, and Will parley, trading Will for Jack. Barbossa frees Calypso, but when Will reveals Jones' betrayal to her, Calypso vanishes and summons a maelstrom, refusing to help either side.

The Pearl and Dutchman battle in the maelstrom. During the battle, Elizabeth and Will are wed by Barbossa. On the Dutchman, Jack and Jones duel for control of Jones' heart. After Jones mortally wounds Will, Jack helps Will stab the heart, killing Jones. Jack and Elizabeth escape the Dutchman, which sinks into the maelstrom. As Beckett's ship, the Endeavour, engages the Pearl, the Dutchman rises from the sea, now captained by Will and its crew freed from Jones' curse. The two pirate ships destroy the Endeavour, killing Beckett, while his armada retreats. With Will bound to have one day ashore and then ten years guiding souls lost at sea to the next world, Will spends it with Elizabeth before leaving her with the chest containing his heart. Barbossa steals the Pearl from Jack again and tells the crew he knows where to find the Fountain of Youth, only to realize Jack has stolen the chart. Jack departs from Tortuga on a small boat to track the fountain down.

In a post-credits scene, ten years later, Elizabeth and her son (Note: Credited as "Young Will Turner" in this film, but never named onscreen. Later retroactively named "Henry" as depicted in Pirates of the Caribbean: Dead Men Tell No Tales (2017).) watch Will return aboard the Dutchman.

== Cast ==
- Johnny Depp as Captain Jack Sparrow: Sparrow and the Black Pearl have been dragged to Davy Jones' Locker by the Kraken; he is trapped there until his former crew mounts a rescue party. He is the Pirate Lord of the Caribbean Sea.
- Keira Knightley as Elizabeth Swann: Governor Swann's daughter and Will Turner's fiancée. Having tricked Jack Sparrow into being swallowed by the Kraken to save herself and the Black Pearl crew, she subsequently goes to his rescue. Swann becomes Captain of The Empress and Pirate Lord of the South China Sea as successor to Feng, and becomes the Pirate King by default as a result of the Bretheren Court vote.
- Orlando Bloom as Will Turner: A young blacksmith-turned-pirate, the son of "Bootstrap Bill" Turner, and later the husband of Elizabeth Swann. Turner becomes Captain of The Flying Dutchman after the ritual is performed to save his life.
- Stellan Skarsgård as Bootstrap Bill Turner: Will's father, cursed to serve an eternity aboard Davy Jones' ship The Flying Dutchman. As he slowly loses hope, he also loses his humanity to the ship, and becomes mentally confused, barely recognizing his own son in the second half of the film.
- Bill Nighy as Davy Jones: Malevolent ruler of the ocean realm, Captain of The Flying Dutchman. With his heart captured by James Norrington, he is now enslaved to Cutler Beckett who commanded him to kill the Kraken ("your pet"), and now serves the East India Trading Company, though he remains volatile and makes life difficult for the soldiers policing him.
- Chow Yun-fat as Sao Feng: Pirate Lord of the South China Sea, he captains the Chinese ship The Empress and has a poor history with Sparrow. He is reluctant to aid in his rescue from Davy Jones' Locker. "Sao Feng" (嘯風) means "Howling Wind" in Chinese. Chow was confirmed to be playing Feng in July 2005 while production of the second film was on hiatus. Chow relished playing the role, even helping out crew members with props.
- Geoffrey Rush as Hector Barbossa: Once first mate of the Black Pearl under Jack's command before leading a mutiny, Barbossa has been resurrected by Tia Dalma to captain the rescue of Jack Sparrow. He was also needed for his "piece of eight" to free Calypso. Rush said that in the film, Barbossa becomes more of a cunning politician. He is the Pirate Lord of the Caspian Sea.
- Jack Davenport as James Norrington: Promoted to the rank of admiral in return for giving Beckett Jones' heart, he has allied himself with Beckett and the Company, although he still cares for Elizabeth, his former fiancée, and finds himself torn between his duty and his growing dislike for Beckett.
- Kevin R. McNally as Joshamee Gibbs: Jack's loyal, if superstitious, first mate.
- Naomie Harris as Tia Dalma/Calypso: An obeah witch who travels with the Black Pearl crew to rescue Jack; she also raised Barbossa from the dead at the conclusion of Dead Man's Chest and has a mysterious past connection to Davy Jones.
- Tom Hollander as Cutler Beckett: A powerful chairman of the East India Trading Company and now armed with a mandate from the King and in possession of Davy Jones' heart, Beckett attempts to control the world's oceans for the sake of sustainable business—and to end piracy.
- Jonathan Pryce as Weatherby Swann: Governor of Port Royal and father to Elizabeth Swann, he is now trapped in Beckett's service.
- Lee Arenberg and Mackenzie Crook as Pintel and Ragetti: A mischievous and eccentric duo, part of Jack's crew.
- David Bailie as Cotton: Jack's loyal mute crewman who returns again to join the quest to bring back Sparrow.
- Martin Klebba as Marty: Jack's dwarf crewman who also joins the quest to bring back Sparrow.
- Keith Richards as Captain Teague: Pirate Lord of Madagascar, Keeper of the Pirata Codex for the Brethren Court and Jack Sparrow's father. The other pirate lords are visibly terrified of him. Richards, who partially inspired Depp's portrayal of Sparrow, was first rumored to have a role as Sparrow's father in 2004, and later reported in 2006. He was meant to appear in Dead Man's Chest, but there was no room for him in the story, as well as his being tied up with a Rolling Stones tour. He almost missed filming a scene in At World's End, following injuries sustained by falling out of a tree. In June 2006, Verbinski finally managed to make room in Richards' schedule to shoot that September.
- David Schofield as Ian Mercer: Lord Beckett's personal enforcer, assigned to hold Davy Jones' leash aboard the Dutchman.
- Greg Ellis as Theodore Groves: The second-in-command to Lord Beckett.
- Lauren Maher and Vanessa Branch as Scarlett and Giselle
- Angus Barnett and Giles New as Mullroy and Murtogg
- Reggie Lee as Tai Huang
- Ghassan Massoud as Captain Ammand, the Pirate Lord of the Black Sea
- Marcel Iureș as Capitaine Chevalle, the Pirate Lord of the Mediterranean Sea
- Sergio Calderón as Captain Eduardo Villanueva, Pirate Lord of the Adriatic Sea
- Takayo Fischer as Mistress Ching, the Pirate Lord of the Pacific Ocean
- Hakeem Kae-Kazim as Gentleman Jocard, the Pirate Lord of the Atlantic Ocean
- Marshall Manesh as Sri Sumbhajee, Pirate Lord of the Indian Ocean
- Dominic Scott Kay as young Henry Turner, the son of Will Turner and Elizabeth Swann. Scott Kay was credited as young Will Turner, and was retroactively named young Henry Turner following the release of Dead Men Tell No Tales.

== Production ==
=== Development ===
"I felt it important that the third film was the end of an era — like in a postmodern western where the railroad comes and the gunfighter is extinct. It seemed that we had an opportunity to take a look at a world where the legitimate has become corrupt and there is no place for honest thieves in that society, so you have darker issues and a little melancholy. The myths are dying. That seemed a great theme with which to complete the trilogy."

— Gore Verbinski

Following The Curse of the Black Pearl's success in 2003, the cast and crew signed on for two sequels to be shot back-to-back. For the third film, director Gore Verbinski wanted to return the tone to that of a character piece after using the second film to keep the plot moving. Inspired by the real-life confederation of pirates, Elliott and Rossio looked at historical figures and created fictional characters from them to expand the scope beyond the main cast. Finally embellishing their mythology, Calypso was introduced, going full circle to Barbossa's mention of "heathen gods" that created the curse in the first film.

=== Filming ===
Parts of the third film were shot during location filming of Pirates of the Caribbean: Dead Man's Chest, a long shoot which finished on March 1, 2006. During August 2005, the Singapore sequence was shot. The set was built on Stage 12 of the Universal Studios backlot, and comprised 40 structures within an 80 by 130-foot (24 by 40-m) tank that was 3 1/2 feet (1.1 m) deep. As 18th century Singapore is not a well-documented era, the filmmakers chose to use an Expressionist style based on Chinese and Malaysian cities of the same period. The design of the city was also intended by Verbinski to parody spa culture, with fungi growing throughout the set. Continuing this natural feel, the floorboards of Sao Feng's bathhouse had to be cut by hand, and real humidity was created by the combination of gallons of water and the lighting equipment on the set.

Filming resumed on August 3, 2006, at the Bonneville Salt Flats in Utah for 70 days off the California coast, as all the shooting required in the Caribbean had been conducted in 2005. Davy Jones' Locker was shot at Utah, and it was shot in a monochromatic way to represent its different feeling from the usual colorful environment of a pirate. The climactic battle was shot in a former air hangar at Palmdale, California, where the cast had to wear wetsuits underneath their costumes on angle-tipped ships. The water-drenched set was kept in freezing temperatures, to make sure bacteria did not come inside and infect the crew. A second unit was shot at Niagara Falls. Industrial Light & Magic did 750 effects shots, while Digital Domain also took on 300. They spent just five months finishing the special effects. The film posed numerous challenges in creating water-based effects.

Filming finished on December 12, 2006, in Molokai, and the first assembly cut was three hours. Twenty minutes were removed, not including end credits, though producer Jerry Bruckheimer maintained that the long running time was needed to make the final battle work in terms of build-up.

== Music ==
Hans Zimmer composed the score, as he did for the previous films. Zimmer composed eight new motifs, including a new love theme for the At World's End soundtrack. He scored scenes as the editors began work, so as to influence their choice of cutting to the music. Gore Verbinski helped on the score. He played the Ennio Morricone-influenced guitar music in the parley scene between Barbossa, Sparrow, Elizabeth and Will, Davy Jones, and Cutler Beckett. He also co-wrote the song "Hoist the Colours" with Zimmer.

== Marketing ==
After a muted publicity campaign, the trailer finally debuted at ShoWest 2007. It was shown on March 18, 2007, at a special screening of Pirates of the Caribbean: The Curse of the Black Pearl named "Pirates Ultimate Fan Event", and was then shown on March 19 during Dancing with the Stars, before it debuted online. Action figures by NECA were released in late April. Board games such as a Collector's Edition Chess Set, a Monopoly Game, and a Pirates Dice Game (Liar's Dice) were also released. Master Replicas made sculptures of characters and replicas of jewellery and the Dead Man's Chest. A video game with the same title as the film was released on May 22, 2007, on Xbox 360, PlayStation 3, Wii, PSP, PlayStation 2, PC, and Nintendo DS formats. The PS3 and Xbox 360 versions of the game featured the "Story of Davy Jones and Calypso", which detailed the backstory of Davy Jones and Calypso, and the curse of the Flying Dutchman, where it was stated that the Captain of the Dutchman would be freed by finding a love that was true.

The soundtrack and its remix were also released on May 22.

== Release ==
=== Theatrical ===
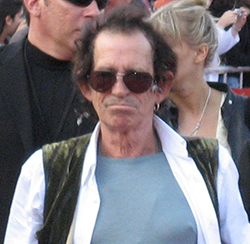
Keith Richards, who plays Jack's father Captain Teague, at the premiere.

The world premiere of At World's End was held on May 18, 2007, at Disneyland, home of the ride that inspired the film and where the first two films in the trilogy debuted. Disneyland offered the general public a chance to attend the premiere through the sale of tickets, priced at $1,500 per ticket, with proceeds going to the Make-a-Wish Foundation charity. Just a few weeks before the film's release, Walt Disney Pictures decided to move the United States opening of At World's End from screenings Friday, May 18, 2007, to Thursday at 8 pm, May 17, 2007. The film opened in 4,362 theaters on May 25, 2007, beating Spider-Man 3's theater opening record by 110 (this record was surpassed by The Dark Knight the following year).

=== Censorship ===
At least one nation's official censors ordered scenes cut from the film. According to Xinhua, the state news agency of the People's Republic of China, ten minutes of footage containing Chow Yun-fat's portrayal of Singaporean pirate Sao Feng were trimmed from versions of the film which may be shown in China. Chow is onscreen for twenty minutes in the uncensored theatrical release of the film. No official reason for the censorship was given, but unofficial sources within China have indicated that the character gave a negative and stereotypical portrayal of Chinese people.

=== Home media ===
The film was released on DVD and Blu-ray on November 19, 2007, in the United Kingdom and December 4, 2007, in the United States and Canada. The 2-Disc Limited Edition DVD was in continuous circulation until it stopped on September 30, 2008. In contrast, the Blu-ray Disc release, containing all of the features from the 2-Disc DVD version (including some original scenes from the theatrical release, but excluding the writer's commentary) is still widely available. The initial Blu-ray Disc release was misprinted on the back of the box as 1080i, although Disney confirmed it to be 1080p. Disney decided not to recall the misprinted units, but to fix the error on subsequent printings. DVD sales brought in $296,043,871 in revenue, marking the best-selling DVD of 2007, although it ranks second in terms of units sold (14,505,271) behind Transformers (16,234,195). At World's End had its television premiere in the UK on Boxing Day 2009 on BBC One at 19:30, and was watched by 6.06 million viewers.

== Reception ==
=== Box office ===
Pirates of the Caribbean: At World's End earned $309.4 million in North America and $654 million in other countries, for a worldwide total of $963.4 million. It is the highest-grossing film of 2007 and the third-highest-grossing film in the Pirates of the Caribbean series. Compared to its predecessor, it grossed far less at the North American box office, but more outside North America. Still, its worldwide earnings are more than $100 million below Dead Man's Chest's. During its worldwide opening weekend, it grossed $344 million, making it the seventh-largest opening.

North America

At World's End was released in a then-record 4,362 theaters in North America, and was shown on around 11,500 screens, which is still an all-time record. On its first three-day weekend, it earned $114.7 million. It set a Memorial Day 4-day weekend record ($139.8 million), which it held until the release of Top Gun: Maverick, another film produced by Bruckheimer in 2022. This record was previously held by X-Men: The Last Stand. Including Thursday night previews, as well, At World's End earned $153 million in 5 days, and is the fourth-highest-grossing film of 2007. Among May's Big Three (Spider-Man 3, Shrek 3 and Pirates 3), Pirates 3 grossed the least both during its opening weekend and in total earnings. However, this was mainly attributed to the fact that it was released third, after the other two films, so there was already too much competition. It is also the second-highest-grossing film in the Pirates series.

Other territories

It is the eighteenth-highest-grossing film, the sixth-largest film distributed by Disney, and the second-highest-grossing Pirates of the Caribbean film. During its opening weekend, it grossed an estimated $216 million, which stands as the sixth biggest opening outside North America. It set opening-weekend records in South Korea with $16.7 million (surpassed by Transformers: Dark of the Moon), Russia, and the CIS with $14 million (first surpassed by Samy luchshiy film), and Spain with $11.9 million (surpassed by The Impossible). It dominated for three consecutive weekends at the box office outside North America. By June 12, 2007, its 20th day of release, the film had grossed $500 million, breaking Spider-Man 3's record for reaching that amount the fastest. This record was first overtaken by Avatar (15 days to $500 million). Its highest-grossing countries after North America are Japan, where it earned $91.1 million, and became the last Hollywood film to earn more than 10 billion yen before Avatar, and the UK, Ireland, Malta ($81.4 million), and Germany ($59.4 million).

=== Critical response ===
On review aggregation website Rotten Tomatoes, Pirates of the Caribbean: At World's End has an approval rating of 43% based on 226 reviews, with an average rating of 5.4/10. The site's critical consensus reads, "POTC: AWE provides the thrilling action scenes, but mixes in too many characters with too many incomprehensible plot threads." At Metacritic, which assigns a weighted average rating to reviews, the film received an average score of 50 out of 100, based on 36 critics, indicating "mixed or average reviews". Audiences polled by CinemaScore gave the film an average grade of "A−" on an A+ to F scale.

Drew McWeeny praised the film's complexity as giving it repeat-viewing value, and its conclusion as "perhaps the most canny move it makes." Todd Gilchrist found the story too similar to other cinematic trilogies such as Star Wars, but praised the production values. Brian Lowry felt that "unlike last year's bloated sequel, it at least possesses some semblance of a destination, making it slightly more coherent – if no less numbing during the protracted finale." Total Film praised the performances but complained that the twists and exposition made it hard to care for the characters. Edward Douglas liked the film but had issues with its pacing, while Blake Wright criticized the Davy Jones' Locker and Calypso segments. James Berardinelli found it the weakest of the trilogy as "the last hour offers adventure as rousing as anything provided in either of the previous installments... which doesn't account for the other 108 minutes of this gorged, self-indulgent, and uneven production." Peter Travers praised Richards and Rush but felt "there can indeed be too much of a good thing," regarding Depp's character. Travers later declared the movie to be one of the worst films of the year. Colm Andrew of the Manx Independent said the film was overall a disappointment and that "the final showdown ... is a non-event and the repetitive swordplay and inane plot contrivances simply become boring by the end". Richard Roeper gave a positive review, saying "Gore Verbinski and the stunt and special effects crews have created one of the most impressive blends of live-action work and CGI wizardry ever put on film," and believing it "rarely drags and is almost always entertaining." He praised the performances of the actors as one of the best things about the film.

Chow Yun-fat's character stirred controversy with the Chinese press. Perry Lam, of Hong Kong cultural magazine Muse, found an offensive resemblance between Chow's character and Fu Manchu: "Now Fu Manchu has returned after an absence of 27 years in the Hollywood cinema; except that, in a nod to political correctness and marketing realities, he is no longer called Fu Manchu."

=== Accolades ===
At the 80th Academy Awards, Pirates of the Caribbean: At World's End was nominated for two awards, Best Makeup and Best Visual Effects.

At the 2008 MTV Movie Awards, the film was nominated for three awards, including one win: the Best Comedic Performance (Johnny Depp). At the 34th People's Choice Awards, it was nominated for five awards, including four wins: Favorite Movie, Favorite Threequel, Favorite Male Movie Star (Johnny Depp) and Favorite Female Action Star (Keira Knightley). Also, at the Teen Choice Awards it won five awards, out of six nominations. Finally, at the 2008 Kids' Choice Awards, it achieved three nominations but won only the Favorite Movie Actor award (Johnny Depp). However, Orlando Bloom was nominated for a Golden Raspberry Award for Worst Supporting Actor.

== Sequel ==
Disney continued the Pirates of the Caribbean franchise with Johnny Depp as Jack Sparrow, Geoffrey Rush as Hector Barbossa, and Kevin McNally as Joshamee Gibbs in stand-alone sequels, beginning with On Stranger Tides in 2011. Since 2007, Orlando Bloom and Keira Knightley stated they didn't want to return as Will Turner and Elizabeth Swann, with Bloom noting the closure in At World's End, as well as both actors having been repeatedly quoted in saying they wanted to move on from the Pirates franchise by 2010. While Knightley affirmed this over the years, Bloom made statements about returning as early as October 2011; eventually being announced to return in Dead Men Tell No Tales. Once the film was shown to test audiences, the filmmakers felt they were "demanded" to reunite both Will and Elizabeth's characters.
