= Davy Jones (Pirates of the Caribbean) =

Character in "Pirates of the Caribbean" films

- Pirates of the Caribbean character
- Bill Nighy as Davy Jones (Note: Poster image for Pirates of the Caribbean: Dead Man's Chest (2006))
- First appearance: Pirates of the Caribbean: Dead Man's Chest (2006)
- Portrayed by: Bill Nighy
- Voiced by: Bill Nighy, Robin Atkin Downes

In-universe information
- Gender: Male
- Occupation: Captain of the Flying Dutchman; Flagship captain of Beckett's E.I.T.C. Armada (temporarily); Guide for souls lost at sea (abandoned)
- Significant other: Calypso
- Nationality: Scottish

Davy Jones is a fictional character in the Pirates of the Caribbean film series based upon the legendary character of the same name. He is portrayed through motion capture by Bill Nighy and voiced by Nighy and Robin Atkin Downes. In the movie franchise, he is first mentioned in the film The Curse of the Black Pearl (2003) and appears in Dead Man's Chest (2006), At World's End (2007), and briefly in Pirates of the Caribbean: Dead Men Tell No Tales (2017).

Davy Jones is the near-immortal god of passing to the afterlife and Jack Sparrow's and Will Turner's archenemy. He is the captain of the Flying Dutchman (based on the legendary ghost ship of the same name), whose crew consists of humans who traded 100 years of servitude for immortality, and master of The Kraken.

The computer-generated imagery and motion capture technology used to complete Davy Jones earned VFX company Industrial Light & Magic the 2006 Academy Award for Visual Effects and was considered revolutionary. Despite the mixed reception of Dead Man's Chest and At World's End, Nighy's performance as Davy Jones was praised, and the character was named as one of Entertainment Weekly's "10 Favorite CG Characters" in 2007.

The Pirates of the Caribbean series was inspired by the Disney theme park ride of the same name, where the character of Davy Jones is mentioned. When the ride was revamped in 2006, the character as portrayed by Bill Nighy was added to it. He also appeared in the attractions The Legend of Captain Jack Sparrow at Disney's Hollywood Studios and Pirates of the Caribbean: Battle for the Sunken Treasure at Shanghai Disneyland, as well as several spin-off novels, including the Pirates of the Caribbean: Jack Sparrow series and The Price of Freedom. Davy Jones appeared in video games like LEGO Pirates of the Caribbean: The Video Game, Disney Infinity, Kingdom Hearts III, Fortnite, and Disney Speedstorm.

== Conception and creation ==
Before officially casting Bill Nighy, producers also met Jim Broadbent, Iain Glen and Richard E. Grant for the role. Other actors considered for the role included Christopher Walken and Ian McShane, with the latter being cast later as Blackbeard in Pirates of the Caribbean: On Stranger Tides.

Like the entire crew of the Flying Dutchman (except "Bootstrap Bill"), Davy Jones' physical appearance is completely computer-generated. Nighy's performance was recorded using motion capture during filming on the set, with Nighy wearing several markers in both a grey suit and his face, rather than in a studio during post-production. Nighy wore make-up around his eyes, since the original plan was to use his real eyes in the digital character if necessary to get the proper lighting. In addition, he also wore make-up on his lips and around his mouth, to assist in the motion capture of his character's Scottish accent. Davy Jones briefly appears as a human for a single scene in the third film, played by Nighy in costume. Several reviewers have in fact mistakenly identified Nighy as wearing prosthetic makeup or a latex mask due to the computer-generated character's photorealism.

=== Design and appearance ===
The physique of Davy Jones and the other crew of the Flying Dutchman was designed by the films' producers to be a mixture of various aquatic flora and fauna features. In the third film, Tia Dalma reveals it is the fate of the captain and crew of the Dutchman should they fail or abandon their duties on board.

Jones has prehensile octopus-like appendages resembling a beard, a prominent sac on his head, and a siphon in place of his nose. Additionally, he has a crustacean-style claw for his left arm, a long tentacle in place of the index finger on his right hand, and the right leg of a crab (resembling a pegleg). It is revealed in the bonus features of the Special Edition DVD that Jones' skin color was partly inspired by a coffee-stained styrofoam cup which was then scanned into ILM's computers to be used as such.

Jones speaks with a distinguishable, thick Scottish accent. Originally, director Gore Verbinski wanted Jones to be Dutch, as he is the captain of the "Dutch-man". Nighy however responded, "I don't do Dutch. So I decided on Scottish." Nighy later revealed that the Scottish sitcom Still Game influenced his choice of accent, stating: "I had to find an accent no one else had. Although Alex Norton is Scottish, mine was slightly different. We wanted something that was distinctive and authoritative...I have seen Still Game and I am a fan. The sort of extremity of the accent was inspired in that area."

== Character biography ==
=== Before the films ===
Davy Jones, a mortal Scottish pirate and a great sailor, fell in love with the sea goddess, Calypso. She entrusted him with the task of ferrying the souls of those who died at sea to the next world. Calypso gave him the Flying Dutchman to accomplish this task. She swore that after ten years, she would meet him and they would spend one day together before he returned to his duties. However, when Jones returned to shore after ten years, Calypso failed to appear. Believing Calypso had betrayed him, a heartbroken and enraged Davy Jones turned the Pirate Brethren against her, saying that if she were removed from the world, they would be able to claim the seas for themselves. They assembled in the First Brethren Court and Jones successfully taught them how to imprison her into her human form.

Despite betraying her, Jones still loved Calypso, and in despair and guilt for what he had done, he carved out his own heart and placed it in the "Dead Man's Chest". The Chest was sealed and placed within a larger wooden chest, along with Jones' numerous love letters to Calypso and all other items having to do with her, except his matching musical locket. The chest was then buried on Isla Cruces. Jones kept the chest's key with him at all times, leaving the locket beside the Dutchman's pipe organ. With Calypso gone, Jones abandoned his duties and returned to the Seven Seas. As a result of this, Jones gradually became monstrous, his physical appearance merging with various aquatic fauna. Sailors everywhere would fear him to the death, for Davy Jones had turned fierce and cruel, with an insatiable taste for all things brutal. Jones recruits dying sailors by promising them a reprieve from death in exchange for 100 years of service aboard the Dutchman. During this time, he comes to command the Kraken, a feared mythological sea monster.

In the book series about Jack Sparrow's earlier adventures, Davy Jones shows interest in the Sword of Cortes, also sought by Jack. He is a minor character, but appears in the seventh book as Jack and his crew encounter the Flying Dutchman.

Jones also appears in the prequel book about Jack's first years as a captain. He helps the Brethren Court to identify the traitor among them, who turns out to be Borya Palachnik, the Pirate Lord of the Caspian Sea.

Before the events of the first film, Davy Jones approaches Sparrow with a deal: Jones will raise the Black Pearl back from Davy Jones' Locker, allowing Sparrow to be captain for 13 years if Sparrow agrees to serve on the Dutchman for 100 years. This event, referenced in the films, also appears in the book series.

=== Dead Man's Chest ===
Davy Jones first appears in the second film, Dead Man's Chest, in which he attempts to collect on his bargain with Jack Sparrow, sending Bootstrap Bill to threaten Jack and give him the black spot to attract the Kraken. Previously, Davy Jones had raised the Black Pearl from the sea for Sparrow, in exchange for Sparrow's soul after captaining the Pearl for 13 years. Attempting to get out of the situation, Sparrow argues that he was the captain for only two years before Hector Barbossa committed mutiny. Jones rejects this explanation, explaining that despite the mutiny, Jack still stubbornly gave himself the title "Captain". Sparrow then attempts to escape the deal by providing Will Turner as a substitute for himself. Jack falsely strikes a new deal with Jones; Jack will be spared servitude on the Dutchman if he brings Jones one hundred souls to replace his own within the next three days (in reality he plans to recruit a new crew to help him find the Dead Man's Chest to save Will and break his debt). Jones accepts, removes the black spot from Jack's hand, and retains Will, keeping him as a "good faith payment."

Jones and some of the Flying Dutchman crew after Will challenges him to Liar's Dice

While on the Dutchman, Will challenges Jones at a game of liar's dice. They wager Will's soul for an eternity of service against the key to the Dead Man's Chest. Bootstrap Bill joins the game and purposefully loses to save Will. During the game, Will learns where Jones keeps the key, being his real purpose in the game. The next morning, Jones realizes the key is gone and summons the Kraken to destroy the ship carrying Turner, who actually survives. The Dutchman then sails to Isla Cruces to stop Sparrow from getting the Chest.

Arriving, Jones sends his crew to retrieve the Chest; they return to him with it. The Dutchman then chases after the Black Pearl, but is outrun. Jones summons the Kraken, which drags Jack Sparrow and the Pearl to Davy Jones's Locker. He afterward opens the Chest only to find his heart missing; it having been taken by Jack Sparrow and subsequently stolen by James Norrington, who gives it to Cutler Beckett, the chairman of the East India Trading Company.

=== At World's End ===
In the third film At World's End, Jones is under the control of Beckett, under the threat of death. Beckett orders Jones to sink pirate ships, but is infuriated when Jones leaves no survivors; Beckett wants prisoners to interrogate about the Brethren Court. Beckett also orders Jones to kill the Kraken. Later, he orders Jones attack the Pirate Lord Sao Feng; Jones subsequently kills Sao and captures Elizabeth Swann, who had been named captain by Sao Feng upon his death. When James Norrington dies on board the Dutchman while helping Elizabeth escape, Jones claims Norrington's sword (originally crafted by Will Turner). Jones then attempts mutiny against the EITC. However, Ian Mercer successfully defends the Chest, forcing Jones to continue under Beckett's service.

Beckett later summons Jones to his ship, the Endeavour. Jones confronts Will Turner and divulges his past with Calypso while learning of Jack Sparrow's escape from the Locker. The three men then arrive at Shipwreck Cove.

Human Davy Jones.

Jones confronts Calypso, locked in the brig of the Black Pearl. The two former lovers discuss Calypso's betrayal and Jones's curse. Calypso temporarily lifts his curse, allowing him to be seen briefly in his original human form. Jones tells her that his heart will always belong to her. Calypso, unaware that Jones betrayed her to the first Brethren Court, says that after her release, she will fully give her love to him.

Jones participates in a parley in which the EITC trades Turner for Sparrow with the latter actually planning to stab the heart. After Calypso is freed, Will reveals that Jones betrayed her. She escapes, refusing to aid either the pirates or Jones. Her fury creates a monstrous maelstrom. The Dutchman and the Pearl enter it and battle.

During the battle, Jones suffocates Mercer to death with his tentacles and retrieves the key to the Chest. Sparrow and Jones fight for control of the chest in the rigging of the Dutchman. Jack acquires both the Chest and the key while Jones battles Will and Elizabeth. Jones quickly overpowers Elizabeth, and is subsequently impaled through the back by Will. Jones, unharmed, holds Will at sword-point. Jack threatens to stab the heart, and Jones cruelly stabs Will. Remembering Will as his son, Bootstrap Bill briefly fights and overpowers Jones, but is quickly defeated. Jones attempts to kill Bootstrap, but Jack helps Will stab the heart. Jones then calls out for Calypso, before tumbling to his death in the maelstrom.

=== Dead Men Tell No Tales ===
Near the end of the fifth film Dead Men Tell No Tales, Will Turner is no longer bound to the Flying Dutchman after the destruction of the Trident of Poseidon. In the post-credits scene, as a storm rages outside, the shadow of Davy Jones appears across the wooden floor of a bedroom while Elizabeth and Will Turner are fast asleep. The shadow moves closer to the bed as the figure comes to stand over the sleeping couple. Lightning flashes as Will sits up to see Davy Jones's crab claw, only for Will to wake up and see nobody there. Assuming it was a nightmare, Will turns towards his sleeping wife and wraps her in his arms, unaware of the barnacles lying on the floor next to the bed, indicating that Jones may have returned.

== Characterization ==
=== Music ===
Jones and Calypso possess a matching set of heart-shaped music-box lockets that play a distinct melody (the latter is a half-step above the former's), and Jones is known to play this melody on his pipe organ. The melody is also Jones' theme as heard throughout the films featuring him; it comes in two variations: one heard only in the Dead Man's Chest soundtrack, and a simpler variant played in the films on several occasions (including briefly after his appearance in Dead Men Tell No Tales).

=== Personality ===
Davy Jones is identified as the Devil by his crew: he is cruel, cunning, ruthless, greedy, proud, manipulative, murderous and careless of other people; traits he has in common with Cutler Beckett. He tried to force Jack Sparrow to leave Will with him and bring him 100 souls knowing that Sparrow is against it. Davy Jones presents himself as an extremely formidable enemy, without hesitation or reservation.

Unlike the calm and calculating Beckett, Jones is brave, daring, passionate, and quick-tempered to prove he is serious. He becomes more dangerous when he realizes that he has been cheated – by Calypso and later by Jack Sparrow. Jones agreed to raise the Black Pearl from the depths for thirteen years in exchange for Jack Sparrow's soul but Jack reneges on his obligation, and balks at renegotiated terms requiring recruiting 100 souls to redeem his own soul. Instead he finds Jones's heart to blackmail Jones into leaving him and his crew alone. Jones refuses to forfeit the cheated contract and fires on the Black Pearl to return it to the depths. Although he does not tolerate the violation of his contracts, he takes liberty with his own promises. After his beloved Calypso betrayed their contract, Jones became bitter, jaded, and cynical; he challenges recent recruits with, "Life is cruel! Why should the afterlife be any different?" His vulnerable nature is rarely revealed, reserved for privacy such as when playing Calypso's theme on the pipe organ, where he sheds a tear for Calypso. Beneath his resentment and vindictive nature, Davy Jones has a repressed feeling of love and goodness: even after being betrayed by Calypso, Jones still loves her, and her name is his dying word.

In Pirates of the Caribbean: At World's End, Weatherby Swann was going to stab the heart of Davy Jones, only for Jones to reveal that he cast a terrible geis upon his heart when he carved it from his body, that if someone stabs the heart then theirs will take its place. The line was cut from the film, but the geis remains in place as the curse of the Flying Dutchman. With the help of Jack Sparrow, Will Turner stabs the heart and becomes the new captain of the Dutchman.

=== Powers and abilities ===
Davy Jones possesses a large number of supernatural abilities. Jones is capable of teleportation on board ships at sea, and he can pass through solid objects. His crew are bound to his every whim, and his enchanted ship, the Flying Dutchman, is capable of traveling underwater.

Jones is immortal, capable of surviving injuries that would be fatal to mortals, though not impervious to pain. In particular, he was able to cut out his heart and leave it disembodied; this soon becomes his only real weakness, as the heart can be possessed by others and used to kill him or leverage him under their control.

Jones can also track any soul that is owed to him using the black spot. Any member of his crew can mark a victim with the black spot, but only Jones can remove it. Jones also has the power to control and call forth the Kraken, a sea monster that can destroy ships upon command.

Jones is unable to step on dry land except once every ten years. However, he can stand and even walk given his path has buckets of seawater for him to place his feet in, and he can also send his crew ashore in his stead.

In a physical confrontation, Jones' mutated physiology also gives him various advantages. His facial tentacles allow him to manipulate objects with the dexterity of a cephalopod and with greater versatility, as seen when he masterfully plays his pipe organ. As he uses his tentacles, his non-human hands can be thus left free to accomplish other tasks, such as when he is able to restrain Mercer's arms while creatively smothering him with his tentacles. His tentacle finger allows him to exert a much stronger grip and control his sword more quickly and precisely than a normal hand could, and his crab claw hand possesses enough strength to halt melee attacks and bend or sever sword blades. He also demonstrates more general superhuman strength when he throws Jack off the crossbeam using only his right arm.

== Merchandise ==
Davy Jones was a part of Series One of the Pirates of the Caribbean: Dead Man's Chest action figure set produced by NECA. Although the initial run of figures had a sticker on the box that proclaimed that the figure came with the Dead Man's Chest and Jones' heart, both props (as well as the key) were released with the Bootstrap Bill figure in Series Two.

Many different sized figurines of Jones were also produced by the toy company Zizzle in 2006 and 2007 including an appearance as a smaller figure with crew members Angler, Wheelback and Penrod as well as in a 3 figure pack with Hector Barbossa and a limited edition gold Jack Sparrow for At World's End.

Jones was issued as a plush toy as part of Sega's "Dead Man's Chest" plush assortment.

Davy Jones and his ship, the Flying Dutchman, were produced as a Mega Blocks set for the movies Dead Man's Chest and Pirates of the Caribbean: At World's End. Although his Minifigure counterpart in the Dead Man's Chest set has more bluish tentacles then his counterpart in the At World's End set, which has more greenish tentacles.

A Lego minifigure of Jones was released in November 2011 in the Lego Pirates of the Caribbean theme.

Children's and adult Halloween costumes were released for Halloween 2007.

Davy Jones was released as a PEZ dispenser, along with Jack Sparrow and Will Turner.

Hot Toys also announced plans to make a 1:6 version of Davy Jones, which became available in 2008. It is widely regarded as more detailed than those produced by NECA.

== Other appearances ==
- Davy Jones appears as a playable character in Disney Infinity.
- Davy Jones appears as a playable character in Disney Magic Kingdoms.
- Davy Jones appears in Kingdom Hearts III, voiced by Robin Atkin Downes in the English version and by Hōchū Ōtsuka in the Japanese version.
- Davy Jones appears as a playable character in Disney Heroes: Battle Mode.
- Davy Jones appears in Sea of Thieves as part of the update "A Pirate's Life".
- Davy Jones appears in Disney Speedstorm.
- Davy Jones appears as a skin in Fortnite.
