= Pirates of the Caribbean: The Legend of Jack Sparrow =

2006 video game

- Developer: 7 Studios
- Publishers: NA: Bethesda Softworks; PAL: Ubisoft
- Directors: Michael Fletcher; Margie Stohl; Ryan Lockhart
- Producer: Dwight Huang
- Designer: Gregg Nakawatase
- Programmers: Michael Donovan Mandap; Kenneth Yeast
- Artists: Damon Conn; Miguel Lleras; Nelson Plumey; David Turnbeaugh
- Writer: Matthew Harding
- Composer: Inon Zur
- Platforms: Windows, PlayStation 2
- Release: Windows: NA: June 27, 2006; AU: July 6, 2006; EU: July 14, 2006; PlayStation 2: NA: June 27, 2006; AU: July 13, 2006; EU: July 21, 2006
- Genres: Action-adventure, hack and slash
- Modes: Single-player, multiplayer

Pirates of the Caribbean: The Legend of Jack Sparrow is an action-adventure video game developed by 7 Studios and published by Bethesda Softworks for the PlayStation 2 and Microsoft Windows. An Xbox version was also planned for release, but it was cancelled. It features playable levels based on the experiences of Captain Jack Sparrow, voiced by Johnny Depp who portrays him in the movies, after the events of Pirates of the Caribbean: The Curse of the Black Pearl.

== Gameplay ==
The player takes the role of Jack Sparrow (Johnny Depp), Will Turner (Crispin Freeman), and Elizabeth Swann (Eliza Jane Schneider) in typical action-adventure style gameplay. As players progress, each character learns new skills or unlocks new weapons which will be useful in defeating enemies and bosses. Each level has a number of puzzles to solve. The game allows for a second player to join in.

== Plot ==
The game begins two days after the events of the first film with Jack Sparrow and Will Turner trying to steal the Skull of Teoxuacata from a Portuguese fortress in Panama. They are double-crossed by their crewmates and captured by the Portuguese Royal Guard. While facing the gallows (and while Jack looks for an escape route as always), he begins to retell some of his stories to the witnesses with Will, albeit exaggerated and not completely honestly; for instance, he always claims that either Will or Elizabeth Swann was with him, even when they insist they have no idea what he is talking about. These stories include how Jack has escaped from Nassau Port without firing a shot, how he escaped from the desert island on the backs of sea turtles (when he was marooned with Elizabeth, the second time, he confesses to the true events, that he was rescued by rum smugglers that were long gone), how he fought a Chinese sorceress named Madame Tang, encountered a legion of frozen Norse warriors visiting the Arctic; some segments are also a retelling of The Curse of the Black Pearl, complete with sequences that never happened and lines that were never said. After Jack retells the event of his and Will's battle against Captain Barbossa at Isla de Muerta, the executioner claims that Jack's story was interesting, but he still resolves to hang him and Will. Jack implies that his story-telling was actually a distraction, as he and Will are rescued in the nick of time by Elizabeth, and the three make a hasty escape. Two weeks later, Jack and Will find Stubb and the two pirates dead in a tavern in Tortuga with the Skull of Teoxuacata in Stubb's hands. They attempt to grab it, but the Skull resurrects the pirates as undead living skeletons, and the duo are forced to draw again their swords for another battle.

== Reception ==
Reception

Aggregate scores
Aggregator	Score
GameRankings	(PS2) 53.58% (PC) 48.80%
Metacritic	(PS2) 51/100 (PC) 49/100

Review scores
Publication	Score
Electronic Gaming Monthly	5.67/10
Eurogamer	3/10
Game Informer	5.75/10
GamePro	3.25/5
GameRevolution	D+
GameSpot	6.2/10
GameSpy	2.5/5
GameTrailers	5/10
GameZone	5.4/10
IGN	(PS2) 5.5/10 (PC) 5/10
Official U.S. PlayStation Magazine	2.5/5
PC Gamer (US)	63%
The A.V. Club	C−

GameRankings and Metacritic gave it a score of 53.58% and 51 out of 100, being "mixed or average reviews", for the PlayStation 2 version, and 48.80% and 49 out of 100, being "generally unfavorable reviews", for the PC version.

The PlayStation 2 version of the game achieved Greatest Hits status, indicating sales of at least 400,000 copies.
