= Pirates of the Caribbean: At World's End (video game) =

2007 video game

- Developers: Eurocom; Capybara Games (J2ME); Amaze Entertainment (DS)
- Publisher: Disney Interactive Studios
- Platforms: Xbox 360, PlayStation 3, PC, PlayStation 2, PlayStation Portable, Wii, Nintendo DS, J2ME
- Release: NA: May 22, 2007; AU: May 24, 2007; EU: May 25, 2007; EU: December 10, 2007 (PC)
- Genres: Action-adventure, hack and slash
- Modes: Single-player, multiplayer

Pirates of the Caribbean: At World's End is an action-adventure video game based on the Pirates of the Caribbean films Dead Man's Chest (2006) and At World's End (2007), published by Buena Vista Games for the PlayStation 2, PlayStation 3, Xbox 360, PC, PSP, Nintendo DS, and the Wii.

Pirates of the Caribbean: At World's End follows the events of The Pirates of the Caribbean movies Dead Man's Chest and At World's End with some additional missions and characters. In-game location include locales such as a Prison Fortress, Isla de Pelegostos, Port Royal, the Black Pearl, the Flying Dutchman, Tortuga, Isla Cruces, Singapore, Davy Jones' Locker, and Shipwreck City. As Captain Jack Sparrow the player visits several locations to find the pirate lords and tells them of the meeting at Shipwreck City requiring the player to battle the pirate lords and their guards or perform favors for them.

Near the end of the game, the player must battle across the Flying Dutchman as both Will and Jack for the Dead Man's Chest. The battle ends with Will killing Davy Jones and remaining behind as Jack returns to the Black Pearl. On the Pearl, the player has to defend the ship against the Endeavour and Lord Cutler Beckett until the Dutchman returns under Will's command and destroys the Endeavour, killing Beckett. After the battle, Barbossa has another mutiny against Jack. Jack later runs into Bartholomew Roberts along with Scarlett and Giselle.

== Plot ==
The game is based on the search for the Pirate Lords for the Fourth Brethren Court (called the Pirate Conclave) meeting at the Shipwreck City. The reason for this research is to try to find a remedy for the pirate extermination conducted by the perfidious Davy Jones. At the meeting, it will be necessary to counter this extermination that could lead to the definitive disappearance of piracy, and to do this the Pirate King will be elected, who will decide what to do.

Captain Jack Sparrow has been imprisoned in the Fortress Prison and is found by his father: Captain Edward Teague, who gives him a sword and helps him escape. The Pirate tells Jack he has to go to Port Royal to look for Tia Dalma: a voodoo priestess who knows the secret to defeat Davy Jones. After freeing some prisoners and escaping from the fortress, Teague kicks his son pushing him into a canoe, with which Jack sails for a while until he comes across the Black Pearl. Immediately notice that all crew members are hidden and "Bootstrap" Bill Turner (William Turner's father) warns him of the threat of Jones looming over him and that he must take refuge on dry land.

Not having time to get to Port Royal, Jack runs into an island inhabited by a primitive population: the Pelagostos. Superstitious and violent, the people mistake Jack for a divinity because of his clothes and they want to give him in sacrifice to make him return to heaven. William Turner (Will) is sailing the waters on a canoe and exploring, he meets Jack, also realizing that the Pelagostos are rather hostile and attack him. Freeing some members of the Black Pearl crew, Jack and Will manage to escape on a semi-destroyed and improvised raft and rejoin the ship commanded by the master quarter Joshamee Gibbs and head to Port Royal.

Here they can find Tia Dalma, who reveals that Davy Jones can only be killed if his heart is stabbed and that whoever owns it controls Jones. Furthermore, he says they must find all the Nine Pirate Lords, scattered around the Caribbean Sea. Jack starts freeing Captain Chevalle the French, who is about to be stoned. Fleeing, Jack meets Governor Swann, who tells him that his daughter was convicted of piracy by Lord Cutler Beckett and that she rushed to Tortuga to look for Will Turner. Joined with his crew, Jack and Will embark towards Tortuga, but are tracked down by the Flying Dutchman. Will heads in there secretly and manages to get the key to Davy Jones's chest and talk to his father, promising that he would come back for it. Back on the Black Pearl, Jones threatens Jack with a slow and excruciating death and that the Seven Seas are not large enough to hide.

In Tortuga, Jack finds and duels with Eduardo Villanova: Lord of the Pirates in the company of his wife: Mrs. Ching. Succeeding in recruiting them, he saves Elisabeth Swann and James Norrington – drunk – from a fight in a tavern and escapes from local pirates.

They sail to Isla Cruces, where they find the chest of Davy Jones, which however is stolen by Norrington, who delivers it to Beckett: now he and the British Navy are in control of Davy Jones, who tracks down the Black Pearl and tries to board it, but the wind explains the sails from the opposite direction. Frustrated, Jones conjures up the Kraken: a giant octopus-like sea monster. The Kraken attacks the Black Pearl, but thanks to Jack's sacrifice, the crew manages to escape and the Kraken, on the verge of death, eats the entire vessel with Jack on board.

Below deck, Tia Dalma reveals that she has resurrected the deceased Hector Barbossa, so that he could help them find Jack and to do so, they set off for Singapore, to agree with Sao Feng, the Pirate Lord of Southeast Asia. He, however, declines and wants to see Jack Sparrow dead. For this, Will makes a pact with him: if Sao Feng had offered him a map and a ship to reach the inside of Davy Jones' chest (i.e the Kraken's stomach), they would have brought him Jack Sparrow alive. Meanwhile, Barbossa fights against the wives of Sao Feng and Singapore is invaded by British soldiers, who manage to blow up the pier.

Embarked, with Hai Peng (the ship of Sao Feng) for the World Borders, Barbossa finds Jack still alive and the Black Pearl is transported back to the sea by some Sand Spiders. Meanwhile, Jack heads to Hell to save Captain Jokar the Gentleman, trapped in a bone cage.

Arriving at the Shipwreck City (Bay of Wrecks), Jack meets his father, who tells him that some of Beckett's men have entered the city and that the Pirate Conclave must begin soon. Jack brings Captain Hammand the Corsair and the captain Sevijh Savajih the Indian in the Hall of the Conclave. Barbossa reached the town in time and joined the Conclave, where everyone showed the Pezzida Otto and voted for themselves, being joined by Elizabeth, who was proclaimed Lord of the Pirates by Sao Feng at his death in the Empress, following the boarding of the Flying Dutchman and which was captured by Jones and freed by the late Norrington.

Jack votes for Elizabeth, making her become the Pirate King. Elizabeth decides to attack Davy Jones's ship, while Tia Dalma turns into the goddess Calypso, causing the Maelstrom. Jack and Will get on the Flying Dutchman and Davy stabs Will who, on his deathbed, in turn, pierces Davy Jones's heart, taking control of the Flying Dutchman and returning to life. Meanwhile, the Black Pearl is attacked by Beckett's vessel, which is defeated and its ship becomes a wreck and reaches the Dutch.

Hector Barbossa betrays Jack and gives him a boat to leave. Jack returns to Port Royal and a baron teases him, calling him only Jack Sparrow, while Jack reminds him that his name is: Captain Jack Sparrow.

== Reception ==
Reception

Aggregate scores
Aggregator	Score						
Aggregator	DS	PC	PS2	PS3	PSP	Wii	Xbox 360
GameRankings	65.30%	58.86%	51.50%	56.80%	58.25%	56.59%	58.09%
Metacritic	66/100	57/100	54/100	55/100	61/100	53/100	58/100

Review scores
Publication	Score						
Publication	DS	PC	PS2	PS3	PSP	Wii	Xbox 360
Edge	N/A	N/A	N/A	3/10	N/A	N/A	N/A
Electronic Gaming Monthly	N/A	N/A	N/A	5.17/10	N/A	N/A	5.17/10
Eurogamer	N/A	N/A	N/A	N/A	N/A	N/A	3/10
Game Informer	N/A	N/A	N/A	6/10	N/A	N/A	6/10
GamePro	N/A	N/A	N/A	N/A	N/A	N/A	3/5
GameSpot	7.1/10	5.4/10	5.4/10	6/10	5.4/10	5/10	6.2/10
GameSpy	3.5/5	N/A	N/A	N/A	N/A	1.5/5	3/5
GameTrailers	N/A	N/A	N/A	6.4/10	N/A	N/A	6.4/10
GameZone	6.8/10	N/A	N/A	N/A	N/A	6.2/10	6/10
IGN	6.5/10	6.5/10	6.5/10	5.2/10	6.5/10	6.5/10	5.5/10
Nintendo Power	7/10	N/A	N/A	N/A	N/A	4.5/10	N/A
Official Xbox Magazine (US)	N/A	N/A	N/A	N/A	N/A	N/A	5.5/10
PC Gamer (US)	N/A	40%	N/A	N/A	N/A	N/A	N/A

Pirates of the Caribbean: At World's End was rated mixed by critics for all the platforms it was released for. From the highest scores to the lowest, GameRankings and Metacritic gave it a score of 65.30% and 66 out of 100 for the DS version; 58.86% and 57 out of 100 for the PC version; 58.25% and 61 out of 100 for the PSP version; 58.09% and 58 out of 100 for the Xbox 360 version; 56.80% and 55 out of 100 for the PlayStation 3 version; 56.59% and 53 out of 100 for the Wii version; and 51.50% and 54 out of 100 for the PlayStation 2 version.

IGN gave the mobile phone version a score of 6.5 out of 10 and stated: "Developer Capybara Games has assembled a perfunctory movie-game that hits its marks -- swashbuckling, cannon fire, vine-swinging -- but fails to engage the player at all. That the gameplay isn't compelling (a problem augmented by iffy control) is a shame, because, with no fewer than 21 levels, this could have been a real value for mobile gamers."
