= Lego Pirates of the Caribbean: The Video Game =

2011 video game

- Developers: Traveller's Tales; TT Fusion (handheld)
- Publisher: Disney Interactive Studios
- Designers: Jon Burton; James Cunliffe; John Hodskinson; Toby Everett; Stephen Sharples
- Programmer: John Hodskinson
- Artist: Leon Warren
- Composer: Hans Zimmer
- Series: Lego; Pirates of the Caribbean
- Platforms: Microsoft Windows; Mac OS X; Nintendo 3DS; Nintendo DS; PlayStation 3; PlayStation Portable; Wii; Xbox 360
- Release: NA: 10 May 2011; EU: 13 May 2011; AU: 19 May 2011; Microsoft Windows, Mac OS X: WW: 24 May 2011
- Genre: Action-adventure
- Modes: Single-player, multiplayer

Lego Pirates of the Caribbean: The Video Game is a 2011 Lego-themed action-adventure video game, based on the Pirates of the Caribbean film series, developed by Traveller's Tales and published by Disney Interactive Studios for Xbox 360, PlayStation 3, PlayStation Portable, Wii, Nintendo DS, Nintendo 3DS, Microsoft Windows, and Mac OS X. The game was released to coincide with the release of Pirates of the Caribbean: On Stranger Tides, and retells the plot of the first four films in the Pirates Of The Caribbean series.

== Gameplay ==
Gameplay is similar to previous Lego video games in the series. The game uses the same two player drop in drop out co-op mechanics used in all the Lego video games. The hub in this game is called The Port. From here, players advance through the game, unlock characters and extras, and as players get further through the game, The Port will evolve and get bigger, revealing new areas to unlock and discover new things. Like past titles, different characters have different abilities. For example, everyone (except characters like Davy Jones who can walk under water) can swim under water, and members of Davy Jones's crew can breathe whilst doing so, Captain Jack Sparrow has the ability to use his compass, which points him to hidden items throughout the level, Will Turner has the ability to throw axes at targets to complete objectives, while female characters such as Elizabeth Swann have the ability to double jump, allowing them to reach higher locations inaccessible to male characters.

The 3DS version uses the StreetPass feature to activate sword fights.

== Development ==
The game was officially announced on 18 November 2010. The game was developed by Traveller's Tales and published by Disney Interactive Studios. It was released in May 2011 to coincide with the release of the fourth film in the series, Pirates of the Caribbean: On Stranger Tides.

A demo was released online at the beginning of May 2011. It includes the very first level in the game, "Port Royal". It is set in Port Royal and is based on the first few scenes of The Curse of the Black Pearl, including the scene in which Will duels Jack and when Jack and Will commandeer the Dauntless and then steal the Interceptor.

== Reception ==
Reception

Aggregate score
Aggregator	Score
Metacritic	(PC) 73/100 (PS3) 73/100 (X360) 73/100 (Wii) 73/100 (PSP) 67/100 (3DS) 71/100 (DS) 69/100

Review scores
Publication	Score
Destructoid	7/10
Eurogamer	8/10
Game Informer	7/10
GameRevolution	6/10
GameSpot	6.5/10
GamesRadar+	3.5/5
Giant Bomb	4/5
IGN	(X360) 7.5/10 (PSP) 7.5/10 (3DS) 8/10
Nintendo Life	(Wii) 6/10
Nintendo World Report	(3DS) 7.5/10
PC Gamer (US)	63/100
Pocket Gamer	(3DS) 3.5/5
Push Square	7/10
The Guardian	4/5
VentureBeat	7/10
VideoGamer.com	7/10

Lego Pirates of the Caribbean: The Video Game received mixed reviews from critics. GameSpot gave 6.5/10 for Microsoft Windows, PlayStation 3, Xbox 360, and Wii, while 6.0/10 for PlayStation Portable, Nintendo 3DS, and Nintendo DS. IGN gave 7.5/10 for PlayStation 3, Xbox 360, Wii, and Nintendo DS, while 8.0/10 for Nintendo 3DS. GameZone gave the Wii version an 8/10, stating "LEGO Pirates of the Caribbean is an impressive action-adventure game that's fun throughout its entirety. Fans of past games or the Pirates license should play this game without hesitation."

Eurogamer rated the game an 8/10, stating that "It's true that those who've played the last two or three Lego titles might experience a little déjà vu, but the rest will likely find that a pirate's life is very much for them." Game Informer rated the game 7/10, stating that "LEGO Pirates of the Caribbean doesn't enhance the LEGO franchise as the Clone Wars game did a few months back, but it offers another well-executed entry."

=== Sales ===
Lego Pirates of the Caribbean: The Video Game was the third top-selling video game in the US in May 2011.
