= Screenwriter =

Person who writes for films, TV shows, comics, and games

A page of a screenplay, showcasing character dialogue, scene transitions, sluglines, and action lines

A screenwriter (also called scriptwriter, scribe, or scenarist) is a person who practices the craft of writing for visual mass media, known as screenwriting. These can include short films, feature-length films, television programs, television commercials, video games, and the growing area of online web series.

== Terminology ==
In the silent era, screenwriters were denoted by terms such as photoplaywright, photoplay writer, photoplay dramatist, and screen playwright. Screenwriting historian Steven Maras notes that these early writers were often understood as being the authors of the films as shown, and argues that they could not be precisely equated with present-day screenwriters because they were responsible for a technical product, a brief "scenario", "treatment", or "synopsis" that is a written synopsis of what is to be filmed.

Screenwriting is typically a contracted freelance profession, not a hired position. No education is required to be a professional screenwriter, but good storytelling abilities and imagination give aspiring screenwriters an advantage. Many screenwriters start their careers doing speculative work ("work on spec"), practicing their screenwriting with no guaranteed financial compensation. If one of these scripts is sold, it is called a spec script. Amateur screenwriters will often pursue this work as "writers in training," leading these spec scripts to often go uncredited or come from unknown screenwriters.

Further separating professional and amateur screenwriters is that professionals are usually represented by a talent agency. These screenwriter-specific employment agencies work to handle the business side of the screenwriting job, typically taking on legal, financial, and other important representative roles for the screenwriter. These professional screenwriters rarely work for free.

There are a legion of would-be screenwriters who attempt to enter the film industry, but it often takes years of trial and error, failure, and gritty persistence to achieve success. In Writing Screenplays that Sell, Michael Hague writes, "Screenplays have become, for the last half of [the twentieth] century, what the Great American Novel was for the first half. Closet writers who used to dream of the glory of getting into print now dream of seeing their story on the big or small screen."

== Film industry ==
Every screenplay and teleplay begins with a thought or idea, and screenwriters use their ideas to write scripts, with the intention of selling them and having them produced. In some cases the script is based on an existing property, such as a book or person's life story, which is adapted by the screenwriter. In most cases, a film project is initiated by a screenwriter. The initiator of the project gets the exclusive writing assignment. They are referred to as "exclusive" assignments or "pitched" assignments. Screenwriters who often pitch new projects, whether original or an adaptation, often do not have to worry about competing for assignments and are often more successful. When word is put out about a project that a film studio, production company, or producer wants done, they are referred to as "open" assignments. Open assignments are more competitive. If screenwriters are competing for an open assignment, more established writers usually win the assignments. A screenwriter can also be approached and personally offered a writing assignment.

== Script doctoring ==
Many screenwriters also work as full- or part-time script doctors, attempting to better a script to suit the desires of a director or studio. For instance, studio management may have a complaint that the motivations of the characters are unclear or that the dialogue is weak.

Hollywood has shifted writers onto and off projects since its earliest days, and the assignment of credits is not always straightforward or complete, which poses a problem for film study. In his book Talking Pictures, Richard Corliss discussed the historian's dilemma: "A writer may be given screen credit for work he didn't do (as with Sidney Buchman on Holiday), or be denied credit for work he did do (as with Sidney Buchman on The Awful Truth)."

== Development process ==
After a screenwriter finishes a project, they pair with an industry-based representative, such as a producer, director, literary agent, entertainment lawyer, or entertainment executive. The partnerships often pitch their project to investors or others in a position to further a project. Once the script is sold, the writer has only the rights that were agreed with the purchaser.

A screenwriter becomes credible by having work that is recognized, which gives the writer the opportunity to earn a higher income. As more films are produced independently outside the studio system, many emerging screenwriters are turning to pitch fests, screenplay contests, and independent development services to connect with established and credible independent producers. Many development executives also work independently to develop projects of their own.

Online platforms such as WriteSeen have emerged to help screenwriters showcase their scripts, pitch projects, and receive industry feedback in digitally timestamped environments.

== Production involvement ==
Screenwriters are rarely involved in the production of a film. Sometimes they come on as advisors, or if they are established, as a producer. Some screenwriters also direct. Although many scripts are sold each year, many do not make it into production because the number of scripts that are purchased every year exceeds the number of professional directors that are working in the film and TV industry. When a screenwriter finishes a project and sells it to a film studio, production company, TV network, or producer, they often have to continue networking, mainly with directors or executives, and push to have their projects "chosen" and turned into films or TV shows. If interest in a script begins to fade, a project can go dead.

== Unions ==
The International Affiliation of Writers Guilds (IAWG) is the international federation of screenwriters' and playwrights' unions, who recognize union membership across international borders. They have 14 different affiliates across various nations who collectively work to verify original authorship, fight for fair compensation, and enforce copyright.

Most professional screenwriters in the U.S. are unionized and are represented by the Writers Guild of America (WGA). Although membership in the WGA is recommended, it is not required of a screenwriter to join. The WGA is the final arbiter on awarding writing credit for projects under its jurisdiction. The WGA also looks upon and verifies film copyright materials.

Other notable screenwriters' unions include the Writers' Guild of Great Britain, representing screenwriters in the UK, and La Guilde Française des Scénaristes, representing screenwriters in France.

== Salary ==
Minimum salaries for union screenwriters in the US are set by the Writers Guild of America. The median compensation for a first draft from a first time screenwriter is $100,000, while the most experienced members have a median compensation of $450,000. The most experienced WGA members have reported up to $4,000,000 compensation for a first draft. Multi-step deals, where the writer is signed on for more than the first draft (typically including a rewrite) can earn a screenwriter more, with experienced WGA members earning up to $5,000,000 for their work.

Non-union screenwriters can also work for a salary, but will typically earn less than a unionized screenwriter. Pay can vary dramatically for a non-unionized screenwriter.

=== Definitions ===
- Against: A word used to describe a script's unproduced price relative to its value if approved for production—for example, if a script is sold for $300,000, but the writer gains an extra $200,000 if it leads to production, the screenwriter's salary is described as "$300,000 against $500,000".
- Option: If a script is not purchased, it may be optioned. An option is money paid in exchange for the right (the "option") to produce—and therefore to purchase outright—a screenplay, treatment, or other work within a certain period.
- Feature assignment: The writer writes the script on assignment under contract with a studio, production company, or individual.
- Pitch: The writer holds a five- to twenty-minute presentation of the film to buyers in a short meeting.
- Rewriting: The writer rewrites someone else's script for pay. The writer pitches their "take", much like they would an original pitch.
- Spec script: Short for "speculative" or "on speculation" as in; "She wrote her script on spec". The writer writes the script (original or someone else's idea) without being paid, and, subsequently, tries to sell it.

=== History ===
- 1900: One of the American's first screenwriters, New York journalist Roy McCardell, is hired to write ten scenarios (each about 90 seconds long) for $15 each (equivalent to $581 in 2025).
- 1949: Ben Hecht is paid $10,000 a week (about $135,315 in 2025). Claims David O. Selznick paid him $3,500 a day (about $47,400 in 2025).
- 1984: Shane Black sells the screenplay to Lethal Weapon for $250,000.
- 1990: Kathy McWorter, who was promoted by her agent as a 21-year-old wunderkind, though in fact she was 28 years old, sells her sex comedy The Cheese Stands Alone for $1 million. This was followed by nuclear-terrorist technothriller The Ultimatum by Laurence Dworet and Robert Roy Pool, and WWII action comedy Hell Bent... and Back! by Doug Richardson and Rick Jaffa, both of which sold for a million dollars. None of these movies has been produced so far.
- 1992: Sherry Lansing is hired to run Paramount and spends $3.6 million in less than a week, $2.5 million for a two-page outline of Jade by Joe Eszterhas, and $1.1 million (about $1,968,366 in 2018) for the script Milk Money by John Mattson. Both deals are records, respectively, for outlines and romantic comedy specs.
- 2005: Terry Rossio and Bill Marsilii are paid $3 million against $5 million for the script of Déjà Vu.

=== Current records ===
Some of the highest amounts paid to writers for spec screenplays:

$5 million:

- Déjà Vu by Terry Rossio and Bill Marsilii.

$2 million:

- Arthur & Lancelot (unproduced) by David Dobkin.

$1 million:

- Milk Money by John Mattson ($1.1 million, outright purchase).
- Epsilon (unproduced) by Rhett Reese and Paul Wernick ("Sources say the Sony deal closed in the $1 million range.")
- The Imitation Game by Graham Moore, at "seven figures" to Warner Brothers.

== See also ==
- Film crew
- First-look deal
- Lists of screenwriters
- List of screenwriting software
- Playwright
- Script (comics)
- Showrunner
- Television crew
- Television director
- Television program creator
