= Terry Rossio =

American screenwriter

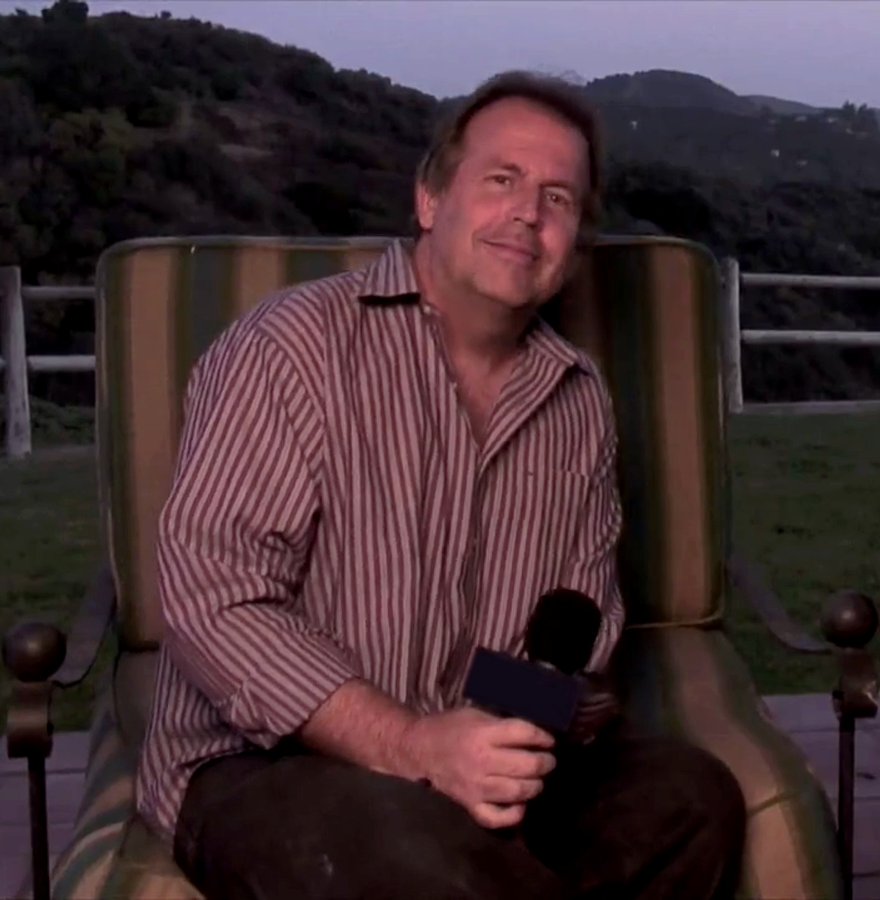
- Rossio in 2009
- Born: Terry P. Rossio; July 2, 1960 (age 66)
- Occupations: Screenwriter, film producer
- Years active: 1989–present

Terry P. Rossio (born July 2, 1960) is an American screenwriter and film producer. He co-wrote the films Aladdin, The Mask of Zorro, Shrek, and all five of the Pirates of the Caribbean series. For Shrek, he was nominated for the Academy Award for Best Adapted Screenplay, and won the Annie Award for Writing in a Feature Production and BAFTA Award for Best Adapted Screenplay. He often collaborates with fellow screenwriter Ted Elliott.

== Life and career ==
Rossio was born in Kalamazoo, Michigan. After graduating from Saddleback High School in Santa Ana, California, he went on to study at California State University, Fullerton where he received his Bachelor of Arts in Communications, with an emphasis in radio, television and film. He is the founder of Wordplay, also known as Wordplayer.com, one of the premier screenwriting sites on the Internet.

Along with his writing partner Ted Elliott, Rossio has written some of the most successful American films of the past 30 years, including Aladdin, Pirates of the Caribbean: The Curse of the Black Pearl and Shrek. He is the eleventh-most successful screenwriter of all time in terms of domestic box office receipts with totals at around $5.5 billion. In May 1993, Rossio and Elliott were hired by TriStar Pictures to write a screenplay for Godzilla, which featured Godzilla battling a shape-shifting alien in New York. Their script was dropped by Roland Emmerich in favor of a new script of his own co–written with Dean Devlin. However, Rossio and Elliott retained a "Story By" credit.

In 2011, Terry Rossio was working on a script for a fifth Pirates of the Caribbean film without his partner Ted Elliott. Rossio's script was discarded in 2012, and the writer stated on his website Wordplay that a major reason was its use of a female villain, which made actor Johnny Depp "worried that it would be redundant to Dark Shadows, which also featured a female villain." By January 2013, Disney hired Jeff Nathanson, with whom Rossio shared co-story credit with. Following the theatrical release of Pirates of the Caribbean: Dead Men Tell No Tales in 2017, Rossio released his unproduced screenplay, and made it available on Wordplay.

In 2015, Dodie Gold Management filed a Commissions Non-Payment Lawsuit against Rossio and sought a jury trial for "damages of more than $25,000 plus a court declaration that they are entitled to the 10% commissions and a full look at the records and accounting of Rossio and his Chamaeleon Productions." In March 2017, Legendary Entertainment announced that Rossio would lead their writers room to help develop the story for Godzilla vs. Kong. He received "story by" credit on the film. In June 2019, Rossio was announced as the screenwriter for The Amazing Maurice.

In 2021, Rossio and Bill Marsilii sold their spec script Time Zone to Amazon Studios. The film will be a joint venture between Amazon Studios and Davis Entertainment.

In February 2023 Ashly Bell and Dr. Bernice A King (daughter of Martin Luther King) announced their intent to executive produce Cash Money, written by Terry Rossio and Kevin Arbouet, concurrent with the launch of ReadLife Entertainment, which plans to create television and film projects centered around strong social messaging. Arbouet is going to direct Cash Money.

== Controversy ==
On November 23, 2018, Rossio expressed his condolences to parents of "vaccine damaged children", however, he likened the term "anti-vax" to a slur equivalent to "nigger." Following immediate outcry, he apologized the day after for using the slur and for proclaiming that both epithets were analogous.

== Filmography ==
Year	Film	Credit	Notes	Ref.
1989	Little Monsters	Written by	Co-wrote with Ted Elliott	
1992	Aladdin	Screenplay by	Co-wrote screenplay with Ted Elliott & Ron Clements and John Musker	
1994	The Puppet Masters	Screenplay by	Co-wrote screenplay with Ted Elliott and David S. Goyer	
1997	Men in Black	Screenplay by	Co-worked with Ted Elliott; uncredited	
1998	The Mask of Zorro	Screenplay by Story by	Co-wrote screenplay with John Eskow and Ted Elliott; Co-wrote story with Ted Elliott and Randall Jahnson	
1998	Godzilla	Story by	Early unproduced screenplay; Co-wrote with Ted Elliott	
1998	Small Soldiers	Written by	Co-wrote with Ted Elliott & Gavin Scott and Adam Rifkin	
2000	The Road to El Dorado	Written by	Co-wrote with Ted Elliott	
2001	Shrek	Written by Co-producer	Co-wrote with Ted Elliott & Joe Stillman and Roger S. H. Schulman	
2002	Treasure Planet	Story by	Co-wrote story with Ted Elliott & Ron Clements and John Musker	
2003	Pirates of the Caribbean: The Curse of the Black Pearl	Screenplay by Story by	Co-wrote screenplay with Ted Elliott; Co-wrote story with Ted Elliott & Stuart Beattie and Jay Wolpert	
2005	The Legend of Zorro	Story by	Co-wrote story with Ted Elliott & Roberto Orci and Alex Kurtzman	
2006	Pirates of the Caribbean: Dead Man's Chest	Written by	Co-wrote with Ted Elliott	
2006	Déjà Vu	Written by Executive producer	Co-wrote with Bill Marsilii	
2007	Pirates of the Caribbean: At World's End	Written by	Co-wrote with Ted Elliott	
2007	National Treasure: Book of Secrets	Story by	Co-wrote story with Ted Elliott & Gregory Poirier & Cormac Wibberley and Marianne Wibberley	
2009	G-Force	Associate producer	Uncredited rewrite	
2011	Pirates of the Caribbean: On Stranger Tides	Screenplay by Executive producer	Co-wrote screenplay with Ted Elliott	
2011	Pirates of the Caribbean: Tales of the Code – Wedlocked	Written by	Short film; Co-wrote with Ted Elliott	
2013	Lovestruck: The Musical	Written by Executive producer	TV film; Co-wrote with Jaylynn Bailey	
2013	The Lone Ranger	Screenplay by Executive producer	Co-wrote screenplay with Ted Elliott and Justin Haythe	
2017	Pirates of the Caribbean: Dead Men Tell No Tales	Story by Executive producer	Early unproduced screenplay; co-story credit with Jeff Nathanson	
2019	Aladdin	Based on	Credited with Ron Clements & John Musker and Ted Elliott	
2021	Godzilla vs. Kong	Story by	Head of writers room; co-wrote story with Michael Dougherty and Zach Shields	
2022	The Amazing Maurice	Screenplay by		
2024	Godzilla x Kong: The New Empire	Screenplay by Story by	Co-wrote script with Jeremy Slater and Simon Barrett; Co-wrote story with Barrett and Adam Wingard	

=== Other credits ===
Year	Film	Role
1997	Men in Black	Additional literary material (uncredited)
1998	Antz	Creative consultant/advisor
2003	Sinbad: Legend of the Seven Seas	Creative consultant/advisor
2004	Shrek 2	Creative consultant
2004	King Arthur	Additional literary material (uncredited)
2004	National Treasure	Additional literary material (uncredited)
2008	The Spiderwick Chronicles	Additional literary material (uncredited)
2015	Jake and the Never Land Pirates	Episode #89 – Captain Frost; Co-wrote storyboards with Ted Elliott
2016	Star Trek Beyond	Additional literary material (uncredited)
2021	Arcane: League of Legends	Writing consultant
