= Mark P. Robinson (editor) =

American editor, journalist, and actor

Mark P. Robinson is an American editor, journalist, singer, and actor. He spent more than two decades at Wired, where he rose to executive editor and, with writer Jeff Howe, coined the term “crowdsourcing.” Alongside his editorial career, Robinson performed as a jazz vocalist and released the album Some Small Dive in 2006. He left full-time journalism in 2022 to pursue acting and singing.

== Journalism and editing ==
Robinson attended Stanford University’s journalism program. He joined Wired in San Francisco in 2000, initially editing its front-of-book section. The section won a National Magazine Award in 2009. Robinson became features editor and was named executive editor in 2015.

A 2013 Observer report described Robinson as leading the magazine’s e-book initiative and quoted editor-in-chief Scott Dadich’s praise of his line editing.

Robinson left Wired at the end of 2015 and became editor-in-chief of the narrative-journalism company Epic Magazine in 2016. He returned to Wired the following year as a features editor focused on long-form work.

Writer Alex Mar credited Robinson with supporting the length and personal approach of her 2017 Wired feature “Love in the Time of Robots.” The feature, published by Wired with Epic Magazine, was a 2018 National Magazine Award finalist in feature writing.

== Crowdsourcing ==
In 2005, Wired writer Jeff Howe proposed an article to Robinson about businesses using the internet to draw work and ideas from large groups of people. In an editorial conversation, Robinson compared the practice to outsourcing to a crowd; the two arrived at “crowdsourcing” as a name for the phenomenon. Howe used the term in “The Rise of Crowdsourcing,” published by Wired in June 2006.

Contemporary and later accounts have credited the coinage jointly to Howe and Robinson. The Irish Times attributed the term to them in February 2007, and William Safire reconstructed the exchange in a 2009 New York Times Magazine column.

== Music ==
While working in journalism, Robinson sang jazz standards in San Francisco clubs. He released his debut album, Some Small Dive, in 2006.

All About Jazz reviewed the album, with Dan McClenaghan discussing Robinson’s phrasing, delivery, and work with the ensemble. The San Jose Mercury News later included Robinson in a survey of male jazz vocalists in the Bay Area, describing Some Small Dive as an impressive debut.

== Acting ==
Robinson has performed as an actor on stage and in independent films. He began devoting more time to theater after appearing in Cinnabar Theater’s 2017 production of My Way: A Musical Tribute to Frank Sinatra. Reviewing the production for the Petaluma Argus-Courier, Alexa Chipman noted his comic interpretation and timing. Robinson left his full-time position at Wired in January 2022 to pursue acting and singing, while continuing to take occasional editing work.

In 2023, Robinson played Bruce Bechdel in Berkeley Playhouse’s production of Fun Home. A review in Theatrius described him as convincing and discussed his performance of “Edges of the World” as revealing the character’s isolation. In 2024, Robinson played Sam in Ross Valley Players’ production of Crossing Delancey. The Pacific Sun described his performance as “a gentle, grounded and complex portrayal of a much more nuanced love interest than rom-coms usually give us.”

In 2025, he played Ed in San Francisco Playhouse’s production of The Curious Incident of the Dog in the Night-Time. San Francisco Chronicle critic Lily Janiak discussed his performance and highlighted a father-son exchange involving his character.

In films, he played Konrad Beissen in the feature Werewolf Serenade (2024) and Gary Clark in the short film Suburban Story, which screened at the Asian Film Festival Los Angeles.

== Discography ==
- Some Small Dive (2006)
