= Crowdsourcing architecture =

Crowdsourcing architecture refers to the practice of individuals soliciting architectural design services for small projects (such as home improvements, landscaping, or interior design) by way of architectural competitions, typically on the Internet. It differs from traditional architectural design competitions in that the projects are usually of a smaller scale, clients are usually individuals, not firms or public entities, and that competitions are usually conducted online and are open to a broader range of participants.

The practice of crowdsourcing architecture has received criticism from professional architects and causes like No!Spec, which consider it a form of speculative work that produces subpar results and exploits architectural designers. Proponents argue instead that crowdsourcing architecture encourages individuals which otherwise would have avoided seeking such services to crowdsource them, providing more work for architects and designers.

== History ==
The term "crowdsourcing architecture" was introduced by architect Imdat As at the University of Hartford to describe the services provided by Arcbazar, a website he founded in 2010. In a paper published in 2012, As argued that there was a large uncaptured market in the form of small design projects that could use architectural design services, but opted not to due to the difficulty and cost in soliciting such services. He further argued that the crowdsourcing architecture model that Arcbazar used could open up this market to architects seeking work.

Crowdsourcing architecture and Arcbazar quickly received criticism after launch from architects, guilds, and architectural magazines. Dwell, America's leading home and architecture magazine, called the launch of Arcbazar "the worst thing to happen to architecture since the internet started." Critics compared Arcbazar to similar design competition websites like 99designs and InnoCentive, which they argued provided speculative work that devalued the services provided by designers and encouraged low-quality work to be delivered.

As of 2025, Arcbazar is still available and in use. Architectural design services are also available on freelancing websites such as Fiverr and Upwork, though not in the design competition model used by Arcbazar.

== Criticism ==
Criticism of crowdsourcing architecture attacks the model on the basis that it results in poorer work than would be delivered otherwise, and that it exploits the designers that deliver that work.

=== Worse Outcomes ===
Traditionally, architectural work is done in a process where designers receive feedback and communicate directly with the client as the design progresses. Integrating the client into the design process allows for iterative refinement and allows the designer to perform and integrate background research on the project. In the crowdsourcing architecture model, iteration is not possible, as architects must include a mostly finished design in their submission to the competition. Only after a submission wins, can the client discuss with the selected architect to make amendments, which could cost the client more than if they had been included in the initial, iterative design process.

Furthermore, since architects are not guaranteed to win any given competition, they are incentivized to reduce the amount of time spent on the project. Background research, feasibility studies, and other considerations are sidelined in favor of making an appealing submission that more likely wins the attention of the client.

Finally, due to the highly open and international nature of crowdsourced architecture, architects may not be familiar with local materials, regulations, and construction practices which may make some designs impractical.

=== Exploitation ===
Architects participating in crowdsourcing architecture must take on risks associated with speculative work. They may not be compensated for their labor, and they may not have ownership of their work after it is submitted to a competition. Architects which do participate in crowdsourcing architecture tend to come from developing countries where the cost of labor is lower and thus stand to gain more from the winning prize for a project.
