= Large Emergency Event Digital Information Repository =

Web platform for emergency information sharing

The Large Emergency Event Digital Information Repository (LEEDIR) is a mobile app and web application that allows photo sharing and video sharing and enables citizens to submit pictures and videos directly to law enforcement and relief agencies during major occurrences including natural disasters, terrorist, and criminal events. Police are embracing apps to crowdsource investigations. LEEDIR's free platform that can be activated by law enforcement and/or relief agencies during a major emergency event in the US and is available to receive uploads from citizens immediately after activation. The LEEDIR application platform is supported by providers CitizenGlobal and Amazon Web Services.

The Boston Marathon bombings showcased the value of additional civilian information for help in solving crimes. Following the event, the LEEDIR application was created by a team of developers at CitizenGlobal and launched in April 2014 by the Los Angeles Sheriff's Department. The platform is provided by CitizenGlobal, free of charge, to law enforcement and relief agencies for use during large emergency events. The events are generally defined as terrorist attacks, major criminal events and large-scale natural disasters. The LEEDIR platform provides upload interfaces for eyewitnesses and an analysis and management system for law enforcement and relief agencies. LEEDIR is supported by a highly scalable, secure cloud infrastructure provided by Amazon Web Services.

== History ==
LEEDIR was developed by CitizenGlobal in collaboration with the Los Angeles County Sheriff's Department and Amazon Web Services for use as a platform that acts as a central repository for eyewitnesses to send photos/videos during a terrorist event or natural disaster. The strategy is a public safety/private sector crowdsourcing collaboration. The LEEDIR/Sheriff's Department partnership was announced on November 1, 2013 in Los Angeles, California. LEEDIR's secure cloud-based infrastructure is supported by Amazon Web Services. The LEEDIR platform is available, free of charge, to all law enforcement and relief agencies throughout the U.S.A.

On April 10, 2014 the LEEDIR Eyewitness Platform was launched via a simulation exercise led by the Los Angeles County Sheriff's Department. Photos and videos were submitted and analyzed over a three-hour window. Following the success of the simulation LEEDIR was launched and became available.

The LEEDIR platform was designed as a way for officials to sort through the tremendous amount of eyewitness accounts following a large scall emergency event. In June 2014, the LEEDIR application was used by the Santa Barbara County Sheriff's Department to help gather clues following the civil unrest in Deltopia. LEEDIR was created by CitizenGlobal and supported by Amazon Web Services. It was developed as an extension of SendUS technology founded by Co-CEO's Nick Namikas and George D. Crowley, Jr. to bridge the gap between online and broadcast media. Other principals of the company include, CFO Mario Wanderley, with a background in telecom and technology businesses in the US and overseas and VP of Business Development Ro Crowley.

== Function ==
LEEDIR can be installed on Android, iOS, and through the website, to citizens, law enforcement, and relief agencies. Users can submit photos and videos anonymously from their mobile phone or online through the LEEDIR website. Video submissions can be any length and can be uploaded and sent through mobile platforms or directly through the LEEDIR website. Photo submissions can be uploaded and sent through mobile platforms or directly through the LEEDIR website. There is no limit to the amount of photos submitted.
