= Crowdfixing =

Crowdsourcing fixing of local public spaces

Crowdfixing is a specific way of crowdsourcing, in which people gather together to fix public spaces of the local community. The main aim is to fight against deterioration of public places. Crowdfixing actions include (but are not limited to) cleaning flashmobs, mowing, repairing structures, and removing unsafe elements.

== History ==
=== Placemaking ===
Placemaking, a concept originated in the 1960s that focused on planning, management and design of public places, was the philosophical background to the crowdfixing movement. According to placemaking, in the modern times all the resources needed to create community-friendly, enjoyable public spaces and keep them in good conditions are available, but decision-making processes exclude citizens' preferences.

=== Crowdfixing ===
Crowdfixing promotes the idea of public spaces as belonging to the local community, instead of areas merely administered and owned by the state.

Crowdfixing also tries to create better conditions for people to interact by providing them with online tools and mechanisms that allow them to set the different stages required to fix public spaces by improving the communication processes.

One example of crowd-fixing is community centers to repair vehicles and military equipment during the Russian invasion of Ukraine.

== See also ==
- Barnraising
- Crowdsourcing
- Placemaking
- City repair project
