= Bill Marsilii =

American screenwriter (born 1962)

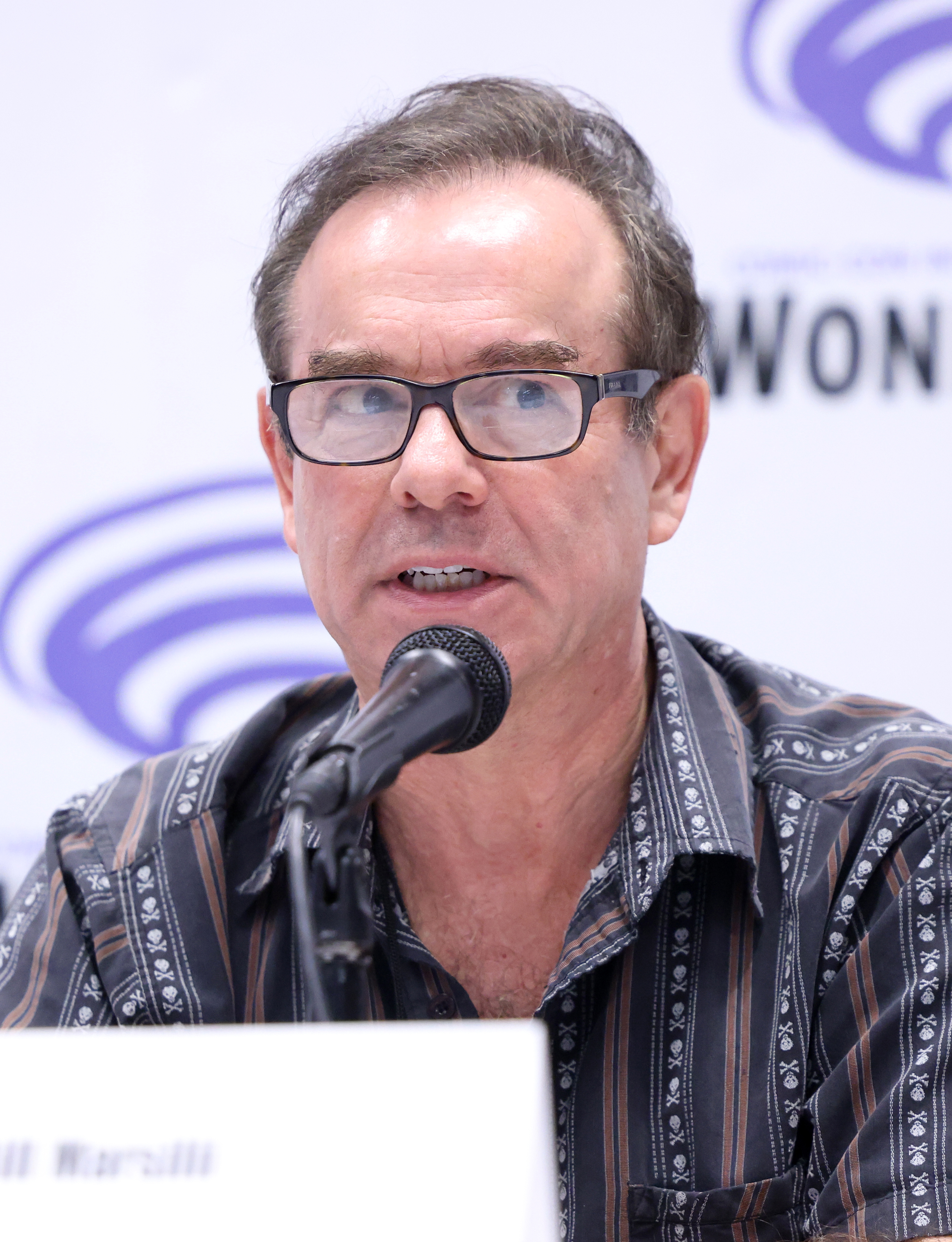
- Marsilii in 2026
- Born: 1962 (age 63–64); Wilmington, Delaware, U.S.
- Occupation: Screenwriter

Bill Marsilii (born 1962) is an American screenwriter.

Marsilii was born in Wilmington, Delaware. After graduating with a degree in drama from New York University's Tisch School of the Arts, where he attended Circle in the Square Theatre School, he founded a theater company called Bad Neighbor and performed solo comedy in Manhattan.

His spec script for Déjà Vu, written with Terry Rossio, sold for $3 million against $5 million, setting a record at the time for the highest price ever paid for a screenplay. Since then, he has been credited as a screenwriter on such projects as the upcoming adaptation of The Wind in the Willows and 20,000 Leagues Under the Sea: Captain Nemo.

== Partial filmography ==
- 1999–2002: Courage the Cowardly Dog (writer; 6 episodes)
- 2006: Déjà Vu (screenwriter)
