= Cancer Medicine =

- Discipline: Oncology
- Language: English
- Edited by: Stephen Tait

Publication details
- History: 2012–present
- Publisher: John Wiley & Sons
- Frequency: Monthly
- Impact factor: 4.452 (2020)

Standard abbreviations
- ISO 4: Cancer Med.

Indexing
- CODEN: CMAEDL
- ISSN: 2045-7634
- OCLC no.: 929387126

Links
- Journal homepage; Online access; Online archive

Cancer Medicine is a monthly peer-reviewed open-access medical journal covering oncology. It was established in 2012 and is published by John Wiley & Sons. The editor-in-chief is Stephen Tait (Institute of Cancer Sciences, University of Glasgow). According to the Journal Citation Reports, the journal has a 2020 impact factor of 4.452.
