= Speculative work =

Speculative work, also known as spec work, is any kind of creative work that has been completed or submitted by volunteer designers to prospective clients, under the circumstances that a fair or reasonable fee has not been agreed upon in writing. Designers are required to invest time and resources to contest with each other to win a contract. This type of practice is common in industries such as arts and architecture.

In a design contest, which is an example of speculative work, the client provided participating designers with a brief prize for the eventual winner. They will then submit their work so that the client can select a winning submission. As the winner receives the prize and contract, other entrants receive nothing for their work.

== Histories ==
The American Institute of Graphic Arts, AIGA, believes professional designers should be compensated fairly for their work. Also, there should be an engagement with clients in which ownership and use rights of the designer's intellectual and creative property are negotiated. Hence, AIGA suggests designers should enter into the clients' projects with full engagement to show the true value of their creative endeavor. They should pay more attention when it comes to potential risks of entering into speculative work. The risks of speculative work make some designers feel the repulsion of crowdsourcing creative work.

== Categories ==
=== Competitions ===
Designers work in the hopes of winning a prize that comes in an unknown form.

=== Volunteer work ===
Designers submit their work as a favor or for the experience without the expectation of being awarded.

=== Internships ===
Designers work in the form of volunteer that involves educational gain which could benefit them in further career development.

=== Pro bono work ===
Designers work for free for the public good.

== Pros and cons ==
=== Pros ===
One main attraction of using speculative work is that it can benefit the clients by bringing cheaper cost and more variations and ideas. As for designers, speculative work can provide them with an opportunity to gain experience, build portfolio, and meet people.

=== Cons ===
==== Efficiency ====
A consequence of speculative work is that designers may spend a lot of time working on projects without any forms of payment guaranteed, so if their work is ultimately not used then this could lead to the designers feeling that they could have invested their time and resources into other projects.

==== Plagiarism ====
Verbal agreement is insufficient in protecting designer's interests in the court of law. As a matter of fact, it is extremely difficult to prove that designers are supposed to be compensated by the clients without formal contracts. Using this strategy, some clients make little changes and then resell the designer's creative work as their own properties.

==== Quality ====
Some designers focus on undercharging their products rather than improving the quality of the work. This situation is even more severe when designers try to outbid each other's to get payment in the contest. It devalues the whole skill-set in the design industry.
