= Déjà Vu (2006 film) =

2006 film by Tony Scott

- Theatrical release poster
- Directed by: Tony Scott
- Written by: Bill Marsilii; Terry Rossio
- Produced by: Jerry Bruckheimer
- Starring: Denzel Washington; Val Kilmer; Paula Patton; Bruce Greenwood; Adam Goldberg; Jim Caviezel
- Cinematography: Paul Cameron
- Edited by: Chris Lebenzon
- Music by: Harry Gregson-Williams
- Production companies: Touchstone Pictures; Jerry Bruckheimer Films; Scott Free Productions
- Distributed by: Buena Vista Pictures Distribution
- Release date: November 22, 2006
- Running time: 126 minutes
- Country: United States
- Language: English
- Budget: $75 million
- Box office: $180.6 million

Déjà Vu is a 2006 American science fiction action film directed by Tony Scott, written by Bill Marsilii and Terry Rossio, and produced by Jerry Bruckheimer. The film stars Denzel Washington, Paula Patton, Jim Caviezel, Val Kilmer, Adam Goldberg and Bruce Greenwood. It involves an ATF agent who travels back in time in an attempt to prevent a domestic terrorist attack that takes place in New Orleans and to save a woman with whom he falls in love.

Filming took place in New Orleans after Hurricane Katrina. The film premiered in New York City on November 20, 2006, and was released in the United States and Canada on November 22, 2006. It received mixed reviews from critics and grossed $180.6 million worldwide against its $75 million production budget. It was the 23rd most successful film worldwide for 2006.

== Plot ==
In New Orleans, a ferry carrying U.S. Navy sailors and their families across the Mississippi River for Mardi Gras explodes, killing 543 people. ATF Special Agent Doug Carlin discovers evidence of a bomb planted by a domestic terrorist, and examines the body of Claire Kuchever, seemingly killed in the explosion but found in the river shortly before the time of the blast. Informing Claire's father and searching her apartment, Doug learns that she called his ATF office the morning of the bombing, and determines that she was abducted and killed by the bomber hours before the explosion.

Impressed with Doug's deductive ability, FBI Special Agent Paul Pryzwarra invites him to join a new governmental unit investigating the bombing. Led by Dr. Alexander Denny, the team utilizes a surveillance program called Snow White, which they claim uses previous satellite footage to form a triangulated image of events about four-and-a-quarter days in the past. Convinced that Claire is a vital link, Doug observes her past footage and is able to track the soon-to-be-bomber when he calls about a truck she has for sale.

Deducing that Snow White is actually a time window, Doug persuades the team to send a note to his past self with the time and place the suspect will be. His partner Larry Minuti finds the note instead, and is shot attempting to arrest the suspect. By using a mobile Snow White unit, Doug is able to follow the suspect's past movements as he flees to his hideout with the wounded Minuti, and then witness Minuti's murder.

In the present, the bomber is taken into custody after facial recognition systems identify him as Carroll Oerstadt, an unstable patriot rejected from enlisting in the military. He confesses to killing Minuti and Claire, taking her truck to transport the bomb and staging her death as one of the ferry victims. The government closes the investigation, but Doug, convinced that Snow White can be used to alter history, persuades Denny to send him back to the morning of the bombing so he can save Claire and prevent the explosion.

Doug survives the process by being sent back to a hospital emergency room, where doctors are able to revive him. Stealing an ambulance, he arrives at the hideout in time to stop Claire's murder, but Oerstadt shoots him and flees with the bomb. Doug drives Claire to her apartment to treat his wound, but a suspicious Claire holds him at gunpoint and calls the ATF to confirm his identity – the call his office received the day of the bombing. He convinces her of the truth, and they leave together for the ferry dock.

Doug boards the ferry seeking to disarm the bomb in Claire's truck, but Oerstadt realizes he has been followed and captures Claire, tying her to her truck's steering wheel. A gunfight ensues, but Doug distracts Oerstadt with information from his future interrogation, and Claire rams him with the truck, allowing Doug to shoot him dead. Doug gets into the truck to try to free Claire, but police surround them. Out of time to disarm the bomb, they drive the vehicle into the river, saving the ferry passengers; Claire swims free, but Doug is unable to escape the damaged truck and dies in the underwater explosion. Picked up by a rescue boat, a mourning Claire is approached on the pier by the Doug Carlin from her present timeline.

== Cast ==
- Denzel Washington as ATF Special Agent Douglas "Doug" Carlin
- Paula Patton as Claire Kuchever
- Jim Caviezel as Carroll Oerstadt
- Val Kilmer as FBI Special Agent Paul Pryzwarra
- Bruce Greenwood as FBI Special Agent-in-Charge Jack McCready
- Adam Goldberg as Dr. Alexander Denny
- Matt Craven as ATF Special Agent Larry Minuti
- Elden Henson as Gunnars
- Erika Alexander as Shanti
- Rich Hutchman as Agent Stalhuth
- Brian Howe as Medical Examiner
- Elle Fanning as Abbey
- Enrique Castillo as Claire's father

== Background and production ==
=== Script ===
The idea of a time travel thriller film originated between screenwriters Bill Marsilii and Terry Rossio, who were friends. Rossio had a one-page idea for a film called Prior Conviction about a cop who uses a time window to look seven days into the past to investigate his girlfriend's murder. As they were talking about it, Marsilii says "I had this explosive kind of epiphany—" He should fall in love with her while he's watching the last few days of her life. The first time he sees her should be at her autopsy!"

Rossio later wrote, "The first concept was good, and the second concept was good, too, and together they were great. Ideas and issues and themes seemed to resonate, and in the end the screenplay felt as if it was telling a single powerful story."

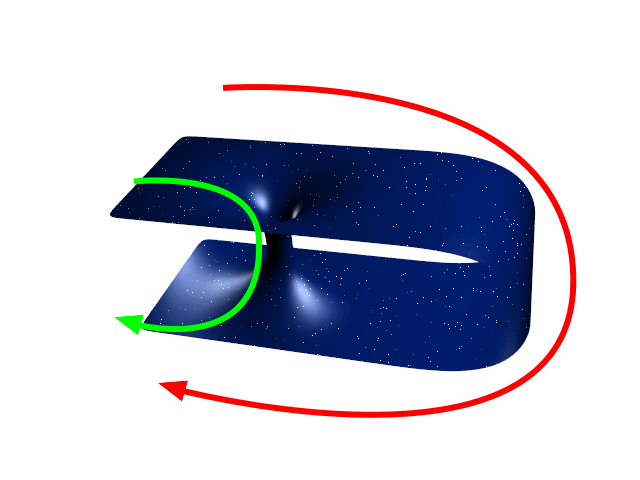
A topological representation almost identical to Greene's idea used in the film to explain a wormhole.

Marsilii and Rossio wrote the script together. They communicated via email in attempts to develop the plot due to communication difficulties.

However, the creation of Déjà Vu's progenitor was set aside by the September 11, 2001 attacks that disrupted New York-native Marsilii, and the advent of the 2003 film Pirates of the Caribbean: The Curse of the Black Pearl, which occupied Los Angeles native Rossio. However, by 2004, the two screenwriters had completed the concept. Brian Greene from Columbia University was brought in as a consultant to help create a scientifically plausible feel to the script. Greene stated "the way I try to explain wormholes in terms of bending paper and connecting the corners, that's there in the film and it was fun to see that made it in."

The timeline of the movie

The script was sold for a record $5 million.

It was bought by Jerry Bruckheimer who got Denzel Washington to star and Tony Scott to direct. Rossio later wrote that Scott was "Completely the wrong choice, in that Tony had stated he had no interest in making a science fiction film, and suggested the time travel aspect be dumped. ... My hope was that we had a screenplay that could be the next Sixth Sense. Tony wanted to make just another also-ran surveillance film."

Rossio says at one point Scott quit the project and he and Marsilii had to work on the script so that Denzel would not quit. They reworked the script over two weeks and "the revision was deemed so good that not only did Denzel re-commit, he called Tony and talked him into coming back on board. Reportedly Denzel made Tony look him in the eye and swear he wouldn't quit the movie again. Tony said yes, but on one condition—he wanted to bring on his own writers."

=== Filming ===
According to Scott, Déjà Vu was written to take place on Long Island, but after a visit to New Orleans, Louisiana, Scott felt that it would be a far better venue.

Principal photography in New Orleans, was delayed following Hurricane Katrina because of the devastation caused by the storm and the collapse of the levees. Many of the exteriors were set to be shot in New Orleans, including a key sequence involving the Canal Street Ferry across the Mississippi River. Scott left the project in October 2005 citing logistical and scheduling issues but returned the same month after learning that the city's dock was being repaired and filming would be ready to start in winter. Jerry Bruckheimer reportedly said that Denzel Washington was "adamant about returning to New Orleans to film after Hurricane Katrina devastated the region", but Washington recalled being neutral on the subject, while agreeing that it was "a good thing to spend money there and put people to work there".

After the city was reopened, the cast and crew returned to New Orleans to continue filming. Some scenes of the post-Katrina devastation were worked into the plot, including those in the Lower 9th Ward; additionally, evidence of Katrina's impact on the city was worked into the script. The filming crew spent two weeks filming a scene at the Four Mile Bayou in Morgan City, Louisiana.

To create a sense of realism, Scott and Washington interviewed numerous men and women whose real-life occupations pertained to positions in the Federal Bureau of Investigation and the Bureau of Alcohol, Tobacco, Firearms and Explosives; Washington has noted that he and Scott conducted similar research during the productions of Man on Fire and Crimson Tide.

=== Visual effects ===
Visual effects editor Marc Varisco, who had previously collaborated with director Scott on the 2005 film Domino, worked again with Scott to develop Déjà Vu into a fully-fledged work. In total, approximately 400 visual effects scenes were shot during the production of Déjà Vu. They had acquired a LIDAR device, which incorporated lasers to scatter light with the intent of mapping out a small region, during the production of Domino; Scott and Varisco decided to use the apparatus again during the production of Déjà Vu. Additionally, the two utilized the Panavision Genesis high definition camera to film the shots that would encompass the past that the Snow White team would peer at throughout the film, as well as the various night scenes. The LIDAR apparatus, which was operated by a hired Texan company devoted to the device, performed scans of Claire Kuchever's apartment, the ferry, the ATF office, and actress Paula Patton, among others. Effects editor Zachary Tucker combined the elements created by the Texan LIDAR company with computer-generated graphics to make possible the scenes of time-travel experienced in the film.

The explosion of the Stumpf was filmed using an actual New Orleans ferry in a portion of the Mississippi River sectioned off especially for the event; the occurrence took over four hours to prepare. Under the supervision of pyrotechnics expert John Frazier, the ferry was coated entirely with fire retardant and rigged with fifty gasoline bombs including black dirt and diesel, each one set to detonate within a five-second range. People and cars were added in later as elements of computer-generated graphics. Chris Lebenzon was largely responsible for moving clips from each of the sixteen cameras in place to create the sensation of an extended explosion sequence. The spectacular explosion actually caused no significant structural damage to the ferry; after a bout of sandblasting and repainting, the ferry was very similar to its previous state. The ferry was returned into service four days after the production of the film's scene concluded. During filming of the underwater car scenes, actual cars were dropped into the water; computer-generated effects were later added, simulating the entities' explosions. Compositing was done on the Autodesk Inferno special effects program.

=== Similarities between Timothy McVeigh and Carroll Oerstadt ===
Jim Caviezel's character, Carroll Oerstadt, seemed to mirror in several ways the story of Timothy McVeigh, a domestic terrorist who destroyed the Alfred P. Murrah Federal Building in Oklahoma City with a bomb in 1995. Caviezel and Scott did not deny this, and both admitted that the Oerstadt character was at least partly based on McVeigh. Ross Johnson of The New York Times also compared the ferry bombing at the film's beginning to the Oklahoma City bombing.

=== Soundtrack ===
The track listing for Déjà Vu largely borrows music not originally produced for the film; three of the songs that make an appearance in Déjà Vu uphold elements of soul and gospel. "Don't Worry Baby" by The Beach Boys simulated the actual concept of déjà vu, as detailed in the plot. Songwriters such as Harry Gregson-Williams contributed music to the film; artists like Charmaine Neville and Macy Gray performed music especially for the film. The music featured in the film's trailer was titled "Hello Zepp", the main theme for Saw. The soundtrack was released by Hollywood Records.

Title	Songwriters	Performers
"When the Saints Go Marching In"	Traditional	United States Navy Southwest Regional Band
"Amazing Grace"	Traditional (John Newton)	Charmaine Neville
"Don't Worry Baby"	Brian Wilson, Roger Christian	The Beach Boys
"Melt Away"	Alex Forbes, Jeff Franzel, Peter Laurence Gordon	Love of Life Orchestra (featuring Alex Forbes)
"Holy Spirit, Come Fill This Place"	Babbie Mason, Marty Hennis	—
"Coming Back to You"	Macy Gray, Jared Gosselin, Phillip White, Caleb Speir, Harry Gregson-Williams, Freddie Moffett	Macy Gray

== Home media ==
Déjà Vu was released on DVD and Blu-ray approximately five months after its release in American theaters, on April 24, 2007. In the two weeks succeeding the day of the video release, the film was the second most purchased DVD in the United States. It was second only to Night at the Museum during this period in time.

Special features on the disc include an audio commentary from director Tony Scott for both the film and its deleted scenes. The DVD & Blu-ray also includes a "Surveillance Window" feature, which includes featurettes on the film's production in New Orleans.

== Reception ==
=== Box office ===
Déjà Vu premiered in New York City on November 20, 2006, two days before its wide release in all of the United States and Canada. Alongside Mexico, the three countries were the sole nations to open the film in November. The United Kingdom opened the film on December 15, 2006, and was followed shortly thereafter by New Zealand on December 22. Australia was the last English-speaking country where the film premiered, on January 18, 2007.

The film opened in the #3 spot behind Happy Feet and Casino Royale with $20.5 million in 3,108 theaters, an average of $6,619 per theater. Déjà Vu ran for fourteen weeks, staying in the top ten for its first three weeks. It grossed $64 million in the United States and Canada and $116.5 million in other territories for a worldwide total of $180.6 million, against a production budget of $75 million. These earnings made Déjà Vu the 23rd most successful film of 2006 worldwide.

=== Critical response ===
On review aggregator Rotten Tomatoes, Déjà Vu has an approval rating of 55% based on 160 reviews and an average rating of 5.9/10. The site's critical consensus reads, "Tony Scott tries to combine action, science fiction, romance, and explosions into one movie, but the time travel conceit might be too preposterous and the action falls apart under scrutiny." On Metacritic, the film has a score of 59 out of 100, based on 32 reviews, indicating "mixed or average" reviews. Audiences polled by CinemaScore gave the film an average grade of "A-" on an A+ to F scale.

Joel Siegel of ABC News called the film technically "well-made," but criticized its attempt to describe a supposedly scientific basis for time travel as both silly and dull, as did Manohla Dargis of The New York Times, who additionally found the depiction of parishes decimated by Hurricane Katrina "vulgar". Peter Rainer of Christian Science Monitor explained that "this may be the first crime thriller to explicitly utilize superstring theory but, in its woozy romanticism, it's not that far removed from this year's other time-warp movie, The Lake House, about two lovers living in parallel years - or Frequency, which starred Jim Caviezel as a good guy." Desson Thomson of The Washington Post stated that "after 9/11, few of us look at terrorist acts casually. It's insulting to watch this grandiloquent pornography, using shock value and Hollywood cliche to evoke poignancy." Todd Gilchrist from IGN rated the film eight out of ten, calling it a "bravura set piece", despite an ending that "feels inappropriate given the urgency (and seeming inevitability) of the story's dénouement." Likewise, Michael Wilmington of the Orlando Sentinel rated the film three out of four stars, citing the "good cast, Tony Scott's swift direction, and unyielding professionalism" as rationale for his rating. Kenneth Turan of the Los Angeles Times described the film's exploration of the nature of time and the implications of time travel as having been a "sci-fi staple for generations".

=== Criticism ===
Both Terry Rossio and Bill Marsilii have acknowledged that the film was not shot the way they had wanted it to be, shifting the blame to director Tony Scott and his goal to focus more on the action aspect of the film than on the more meaningful plot the screenplay had called for. Marsilii, although "quite critical of the mistakes made," said he was proud of the finished product. Rossio, however, was so put off during filming that he, as of May 2008, had not seen the film. Rossio complained that Scott had ignored the inclusion of important plot details from the screenplay whenever "there was something he wanted to do" instead. In the DVD commentary, Scott admits that he thought he did a mediocre job shooting [the chase scene].

Rossio and Marsilii believe that many of the negative reviews of Déjà Vu are a direct result of Scott's direction of the film, and have stated that "Tony Scott added nothing to Déjà Vu and made several hundred small mistakes and about eight or nine deadly mistakes", which makes the film seem like it has many unforgivable plot holes, when it should not have had any. "[T]here are no plot holes at all, and scrutiny reveals the plot to be air tight." says Rossio. "We had years to think of all this and work it out." It was felt there were many misunderstandings that Scott's take on the plot introduced into the film. In his own defense, Scott cited in an interview with Iain Blair of BNET that only nineteen weeks were provided for the production of the film, which "isn't a lot for a film like Déjà Vu."

=== Awards ===
Although reviews from critics were mixed, Déjà Vu was nominated for six different awards, winning one. Déjà Vu was nominated for the Saturn Award in the category "Best Science Fiction Film", but lost to Children of Men.

Paula Patton, who played Claire Kuchever, was nominated for "Best Breakthrough Performance" for the Black Reel Awards. The award was won by Brandon T. Jackson for his performance in the film Roll Bounce.

Harry Gregson-Williams, the composer of the film's soundtrack, was nominated for the "Film Composer of the Year" division of the World Soundtrack Academy Awards (the award was won by Alexandre Desplat for his score with The Queen).

Déjà Vu received two nominations pertaining to the "Best Fire Stunt" and the "Best Work with a Vehicle", while it won the International Gold Reel Award at the Nielsen EDI Gold Reel Awards ceremonies.

== See also ==
- List of films featuring time loops
- Wormholes in fiction
- Source Code, a 2011 film with a similar plot.
- Deus ex machina
