= Pirates of the Caribbean =

Disney media franchise

- Created by: Walt Disney (attraction); Ted Elliott and Terry Rossio (films)
- Original work: Pirates of the Caribbean (ride, 1967)
- Owner: The Walt Disney Company
- Years: 1967–present

Print publications
- Novels: List of books
- Comics: List of comic books

Films and television
- Films: Film series; The Curse of the Black Pearl (2003); Dead Man's Chest (2006); At World's End (2007); On Stranger Tides (2011); Dead Men Tell No Tales (2017)

Games
- Video games: List of video games

Audio
- Soundtracks: 1966 soundtrack; The Curse of the Black Pearl; Dead Man's Chest; Swashbuckling Sea Songs; Soundtrack Treasures Collection; At World's End; At World's End Remixes; On Stranger Tides; Dead Men Tell No Tales

Miscellaneous
- Toy: Lego Pirates of the Caribbean
- Theme park attractions: Pirates of the Caribbean (since 1967); Battle for the Sunken Treasure (since 2016); The Legend of Captain Jack Sparrow (2012–14)

Pirates of the Caribbean is a Disney media franchise encompassing numerous theme park rides, a series of films, and spin-off novels, as well as a number of related video games and other media publications. The franchise originated with Walt Disney's theme park ride of the same name, which opened at Disneyland in 1967 and was one of the last Disneyland attractions overseen by Walt Disney. Disney based the ride on pirate legends, folklore and novels, such as those by Italian writer Emilio Salgari. The rides can be found at five Disney theme park resorts.

Pirates of the Caribbean became a media franchise in the 2000s with the release of The Curse of the Black Pearl in 2003; it was followed by four sequels. Produced by Jerry Bruckheimer and originally written by screenwriters Ted Elliott and Terry Rossio, the films have grossed over $4.5 billion worldwide by 2019, putting the film franchise 16th in the list of all-time highest-grossing franchises and film series. The Pirates of the Caribbean franchise is also one of the highest-grossing media franchises of all time.

== Rides and attractions ==
=== Pirates of the Caribbean ===
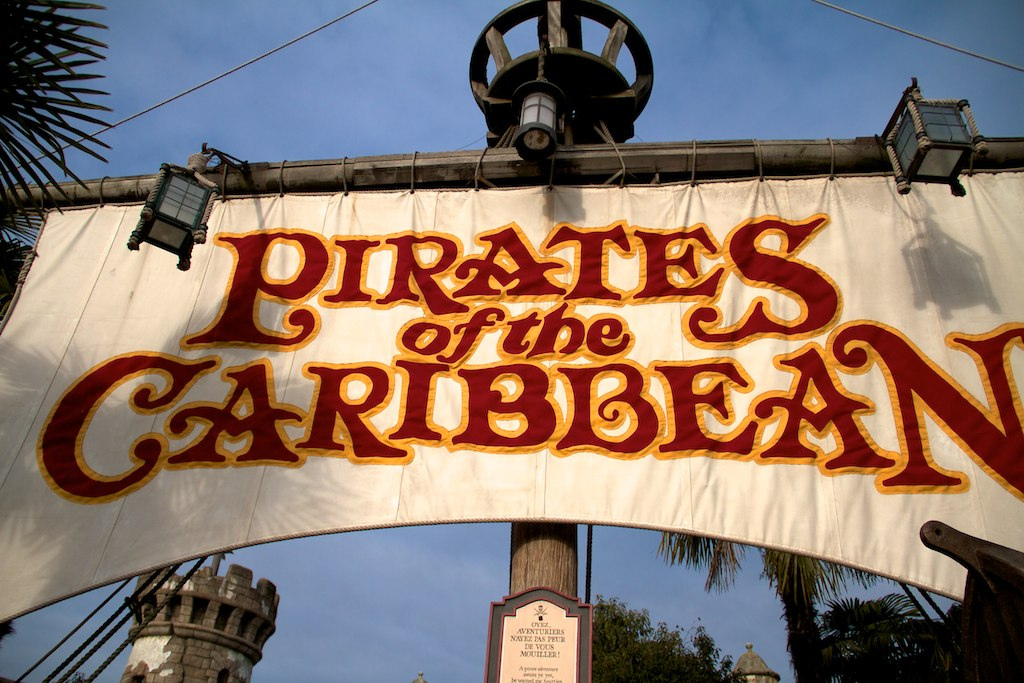
Pirates of the Caribbean at Disneyland Paris

Pirates of the Caribbean is a dark ride at Disneyland, Walt Disney World's Magic Kingdom, Tokyo Disneyland, and Disneyland Park at Disneyland Paris. Opening on March 18, 1967, the Disneyland version of Pirates of the Caribbean was the last ride that Walt Disney himself participated in designing, debuting three months after his death. The ride gave rise to the song "Yo Ho (A Pirate's Life for Me)" written by George Bruns and Xavier Atencio, and performed on the ride's recording by The Mellomen.

=== Pirate's Lair on Tom Sawyer Island ===
Pirate's Lair on Tom Sawyer Island is a rebranding of Tom Sawyer Island, an artificial island surrounded by the Rivers of America at Disneyland, Magic Kingdom and Tokyo Disneyland. It contains structures and caves with references to Mark Twain characters from the novel The Adventures of Tom Sawyer, and provides interactive, climbing, and scenic opportunities. At Disneyland in 2007, Disney added references to the Pirates of the Caribbean film series.

=== Pirates of the Caribbean: Battle for the Sunken Treasure ===
Pirates of the Caribbean: Battle for the Sunken Treasure is a magnetic powered dark ride at Shanghai Disneyland. It uses a storyline based on the Pirates of the Caribbean film series. It blends digital large-screen projection technology with traditional set pieces and audio animatronics. Walt Disney Imagineering designed the ride and Industrial Light & Magic created the computer-generated visual effects.

== Film series ==
1. Pirates of the Caribbean: The Curse of the Black Pearl (2003)
2. Pirates of the Caribbean: Dead Man's Chest (2006)
3. Pirates of the Caribbean: At World's End (2007)
4. Pirates of the Caribbean: On Stranger Tides (2011)
5. Pirates of the Caribbean: Dead Men Tell No Tales (2017)
6. Untitled sixth film (TBA)
7. Untitled spin-off film (TBA)

== Video games ==
- Pirates of the Caribbean (originally entitled Sea Dogs II) was released in 2003 by Bethesda Softworks to coincide with the release of Pirates of the Caribbean: The Curse of the Black Pearl. Although it had no relation to the characters, it features the film's storyline about cursed Aztec gold and undead pirates, and it was the first of several games to be based on the franchise.
- The Kingdom Hearts video game series includes Port Royal as a world in Kingdom Hearts II, adapting the story of The Curse of the Black Pearl. The world returns as The Caribbean in Kingdom Hearts III, this time adapting the story of At World's End. In both games Jack Sparrow appears as a party member of the protagonist, Sora.
- Pirates of the Caribbean Multiplayer Mobile for mobile phones.
- Pirates of the Caribbean Online a massively multiplayer online role-playing game which was released in October 2007.
- Pirates of the Caribbean: The Curse of the Black Pearl for Game Boy Advance (Nintendo) and a few others. This game is based on Captain Jack Sparrow's misadventures in the pursuit of saving Ria Anasagasti with his shipmate Will Turner.
- Pirates of the Caribbean: The Legend of Jack Sparrow was released for the PlayStation 2 console and for PC.
- Pirates of the Caribbean: Dead Man's Chest, was released for the Nintendo DS, PlayStation Portable, Game Boy Advance and others.
- Pirates of the Caribbean: At World's End was released on May 22, 2007, and was based on the film of the same name which was released on May 25. It was the first game in the series to be released for a seventh generation console.
- Pirates of the Caribbean: Armada of the Damned, an action and role playing video game, was being developed by Propaganda Games but was cancelled in October 2010.
- Lego Pirates of the Caribbean: The Video Game, released in May 2011, covers the first four films, featuring over 70 characters and over 21 levels.
- Pirates of the Caribbean: Master of the Seas, a gaming app available on Android and iOS.
- Jack Sparrow, Barbossa, and Davy Jones are playable characters in Disney Infinity and other entries in its series. A playset themed after the franchise was included with the starter pack.
- Jack Sparrow, Will Turner, Elizabeth Swann, Captain Barbossa, Davy Jones and Tia Dalma appear as playable characters in the world builder game Disney Magic Kingdoms. In the game the characters and other elements are focused on the first three films.
- A mash-up pack based on Pirates of the Caribbean was released on August 27, 2018 for Minecraft's Bedrock, Xbox 360, and PlayStation 3 versions of the game.
- As part of a crossover collaboration with the pirate setting video game Sea of Thieves, a free expansion titled A Pirate's Life was released on June 22, 2021, featuring a new original story along with characters such as Jack Sparrow, Joshamee Gibbs, and Davy Jones.
- A Fortnite collaboration started on July 17, 2024, with skins depicting Elizabeth Swann, Captain Barbosa, Davy Jones and Jack Sparrow. In the Battle Royale game mode, there are locations relating to the series and some NPCs of characters the same skins that you can interact with. From July 17, 2024 to August 8, 2024, there are quests you can complete in game to unlock accessories portraying iconic objects in the film series.

== Books ==
Two series of young reader books have been released as prequels to the first film:

- Pirates of the Caribbean: Jack Sparrow written under the shared pseudonym of Rob Kidd (13 books, 2006 - 2009)
- Pirates of the Caribbean: Legends of the Brethren Court written by Tui T. Sutherland writing under the pseudonym of Rob Kidd (5 books, 2008–2010)

In addition there is a novel taking place between the two series:

- Pirates of the Caribbean: The Price of Freedom by Ann C. Crispin

Novelizations

- Pirates of the Caribbean: The Curse of the Black Pearl (2003 junior novelization) by Irene Trimble
- Pirates of the Caribbean: The Curse of the Black Pearl (2006 junior novelization)
- Pirates of the Caribbean: Dead Man's Chest: Swann Song
- Pirates of the Caribbean: Dead Man's Chest: The Chase is On
- Pirates of the Caribbean: Dead Man's Chest: The Curse of Davy Jones
- Pirates of the Caribbean: Dead Man's Chest (junior novelization, 2006) by Irene Trimble
- Pirates of the Caribbean: At World's End (junior novelization, 2007) by Tui T. Sutherland
- Pirates of the Caribbean: At World's End: Singapore!
- Pirates of the Caribbean: At World's End: The Mystic's Journey
- Pirates of the Caribbean: On Stranger Tides (junior novelization, 2011) by James Ponti
- Pirates of the Caribbean: Dead Men Tell No Tales (novelization, 2017) by Elizabeth Rudnick

Further fictional books

- Pirates of the Caribbean: A Storm at Sea
- Pirates of the Caribbean: Escape from Davy Jones
- Pirates of the Caribbean: Ghost Ship
- Pirates of the Caribbean: The Missing Pirate
- The Pirates' ~~Code~~ Guidelines: A Booke for Those Who Desire to Keep to the Code and Live a Pirate's Life written under the pseudonym of Joshamee Gibbs (2007)
- The Secret Files of the East India Trading Company (2007)
- Pirates of the Caribbean: Dead Men Tell No Tales: The Brightest Star in the North: The Adventures of Carina Smyth by Meredith Rusu (2017)

Reference books

- Walt Disney's Pirates of the Caribbean: The Story of the Robust Adventure in New Orleans Square (1968)
- Walt Disney's Pirates of the Caribbean: The Story of the Robust Adventure in Disneyland and Walt Disney World (1974)
- Pirates of the Caribbean: From the Magic Kingdom to the Movies (2005 original; 2006 revised edition)
- Pirates of the Caribbean: The Visual Guide (2006)
- Pirates of the Caribbean: The Legend of Jack Sparrow: Official Strategy Guide (2006)
- Pirates of the Caribbean: The Complete Visual Guide (2007)
- Pirates of the Caribbean: At World's End: Official Strategy Guide (2007)
- Bring Me That Horizon: The Making of Pirates of the Caribbean (2007)
- Pirates of the Caribbean: On Stranger Tides: The Visual Guide (2011)
- The Captain Jack Sparrow Handbook (2011)
- Disney Pirates: The Definitive Collector's Anthology (2017)

German novelizations

- Fluch der Karibik (2006) by Rebecca Hohlbein and Wolfgang Hohlbein
- Pirates of the Caribbean - Fluch der Karibik 2 (2006) by Rebecca Hohlbein and Wolfgang Hohlbein
- Pirates of the Caribbean - Am Ende der Welt (2007) by Rebecca Hohlbein and Wolfgang Hohlbein

== Comic books ==
The Pirates of the Caribbean comic series by Joe Books Ltd:

- The Guardians of Windward Cove
- Smoke on the Water
- Banshee's Boon
- Mother of Water
- Beyond Port Royal

Comic book adaptions:

- Pirates of the Caribbean: At World's End (comic)
- Pirates of the Caribbean: Dead Man's Chest (comic)
- Pirates of the Caribbean: Dead Men Tell No Tales: Movie Graphic Novel
- Pirates of the Caribbean: The Curse of the Black Pearl (comic)

Comics have also been published in the Disney Adventures and Pirati dei Caraibi magazines.

== Adaptations ==
Several additional works have been derived from the franchise:

- In 2000, Pirates of the Caribbean: Battle for Buccaneer Gold, opened at DisneyQuest at Florida's Walt Disney World Resort. The ride allows up to five players to board a virtual pirate ship and attempt to sink other ships with water cannons.
- A Pirates of the Caribbean board game Monopoly is manufactured by USAopoly.
- A Pirates of the Caribbean version of the board game The Game of Life was developed.
- A Pirates of the Caribbean version of the board game Battleship is produced by Hasbro under the title of Battleship Command.
- Pirates of the Caribbean was the name of a team participating in the 2005–2006 Volvo Ocean Race. Their boat was named the Black Pearl.
- Two Pirates of the Caribbean pinball machines have been produced: one in 2006 by Stern and one in 2018 by Jersey Jack.

== See also ==
- List of locations in Pirates of the Caribbean
