= Pirates of the Caribbean (film series) =

Film series

- Directed by: Gore Verbinski (1–3); Rob Marshall (4); Joachim Rønning (5); Espen Sandberg (5)
- Screenplay by: Ted Elliott (1–4); Terry Rossio (1–4); Jeff Nathanson (5)
- Story by: Ted Elliott (1–4); Terry Rossio (1–5); Stuart Beattie (1); Jay Wolpert (1); Jeff Nathanson (5)
- Based on: Walt Disney's Pirates of the Caribbean; On Stranger Tides by Tim Powers (4)
- Produced by: Jerry Bruckheimer
- Starring: Johnny Depp (1–5); Geoffrey Rush (1-5); Kevin McNally (1–5); Orlando Bloom (1–3, 5); Keira Knightley (1–3, 5) (See below)
- Music by: Klaus Badelt (1); Hans Zimmer (2–4); Geoff Zanelli (5)
- Production companies: Walt Disney Pictures; Jerry Bruckheimer Films
- Distributed by: Walt Disney Studios Motion Pictures
- Running time: 726 minutes (1–5)
- Country: United States
- Language: English
- Budget: Total (5 films): $1.274–1.364 billion
- Box office: Total (5 films): $4.524 billion

Pirates of the Caribbean is an American film series produced by Jerry Bruckheimer and based on Disney's theme park attraction. The film series serves as a major component of the Pirates of the Caribbean media franchise. The films are set primarily in the Caribbean, based on a fictionalized version of the Golden Age of Piracy (c. 1650–1726) while also leading to the range of a mid-1700s setting.

Directors of the series include Gore Verbinski (films 1–3), Rob Marshall (4), Joachim Rønning (5), and Espen Sandberg (5). The series is primarily written by Ted Elliott (1–4) and Terry Rossio (1–5); other writers include Stuart Beattie (1), Jay Wolpert (1) and Jeff Nathanson (5).

The stories follow the adventures of Captain Jack Sparrow (Johnny Depp) with various other characters, including Jack's former first mate Hector Barbossa (Geoffrey Rush) and first mate Joshamee Gibbs (Kevin McNally), over the course of the films.

The film series started in 2003 with Pirates of the Caribbean: The Curse of the Black Pearl, which had a positive reception from audiences and film critics. It grossed $654 million worldwide. After the first film's success, Walt Disney Pictures announced that a film series was in the works. The franchise's second film, subtitled Dead Man's Chest, was released in 2006 and broke financial records worldwide the day of its premiere. Dead Man's Chest became the top-grossing movie of 2006 with almost $1.1 billion at the worldwide box office. The third film in the series, subtitled At World's End, followed in 2007 earning $962 million. Disney released a fourth film, subtitled On Stranger Tides, in 2011 in conventional 2D, Digital 3-D and IMAX 3D. On Stranger Tides succeeded in also grossing more than $1 billion, becoming the second film in the franchise and only the eighth film in history to do this, at the time of release. A fifth film, subtitled Dead Men Tell No Tales, was released in 2017 earning $796 million.

The franchise has grossed over $4.5 billion worldwide. It is the 17th-highest-grossing film series of all time, and is the first film franchise to produce two or more films that grossed over $1 billion.

== Films ==
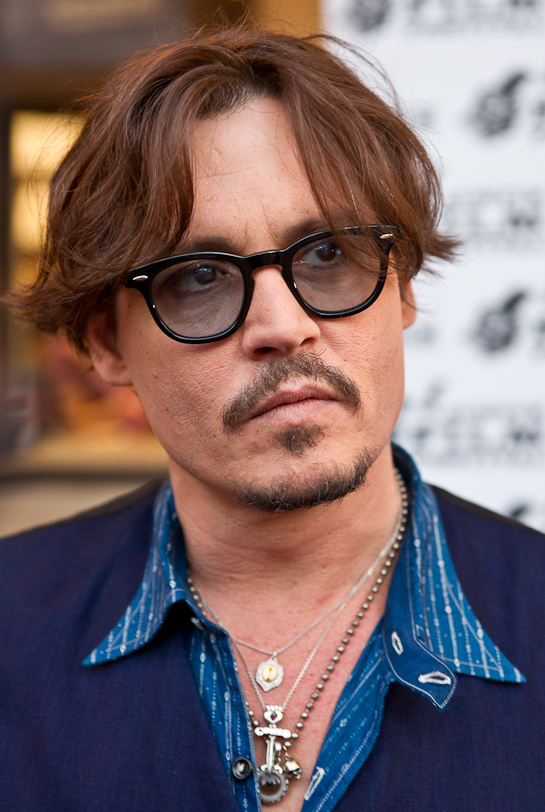
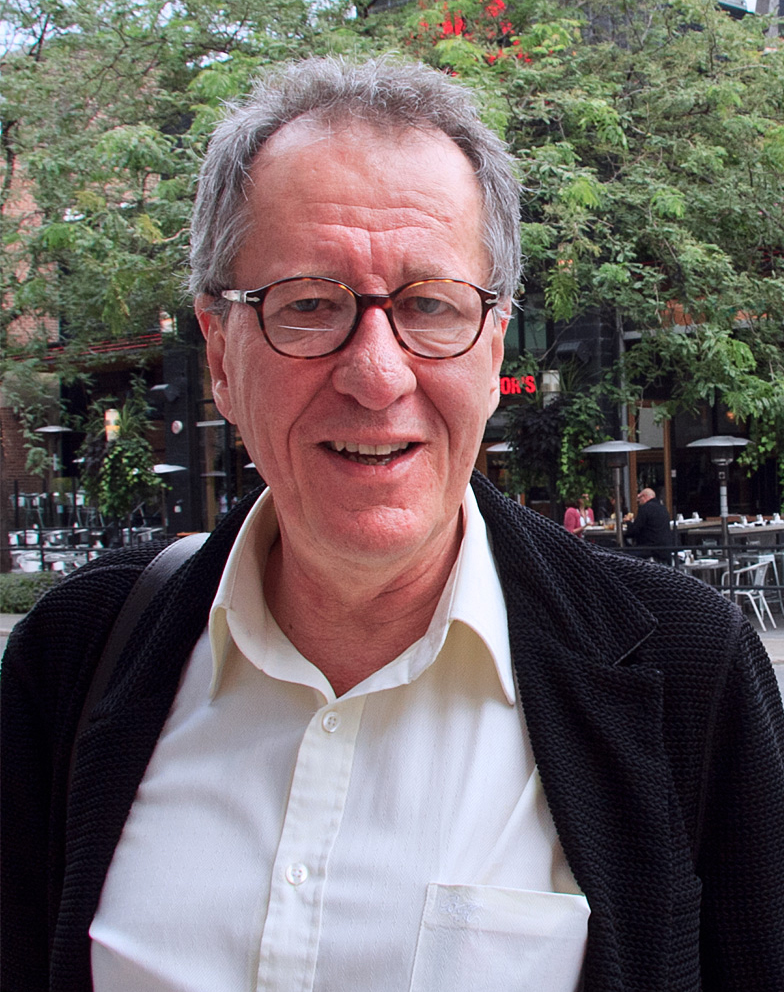
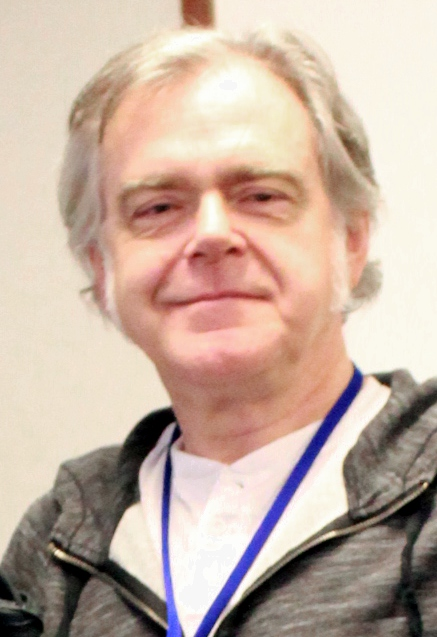
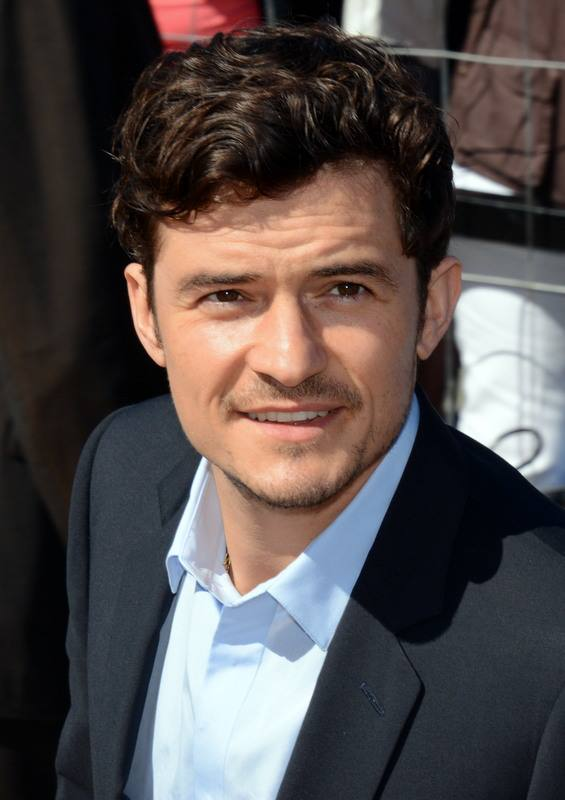
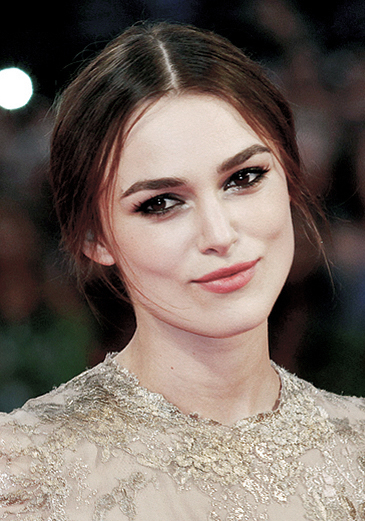
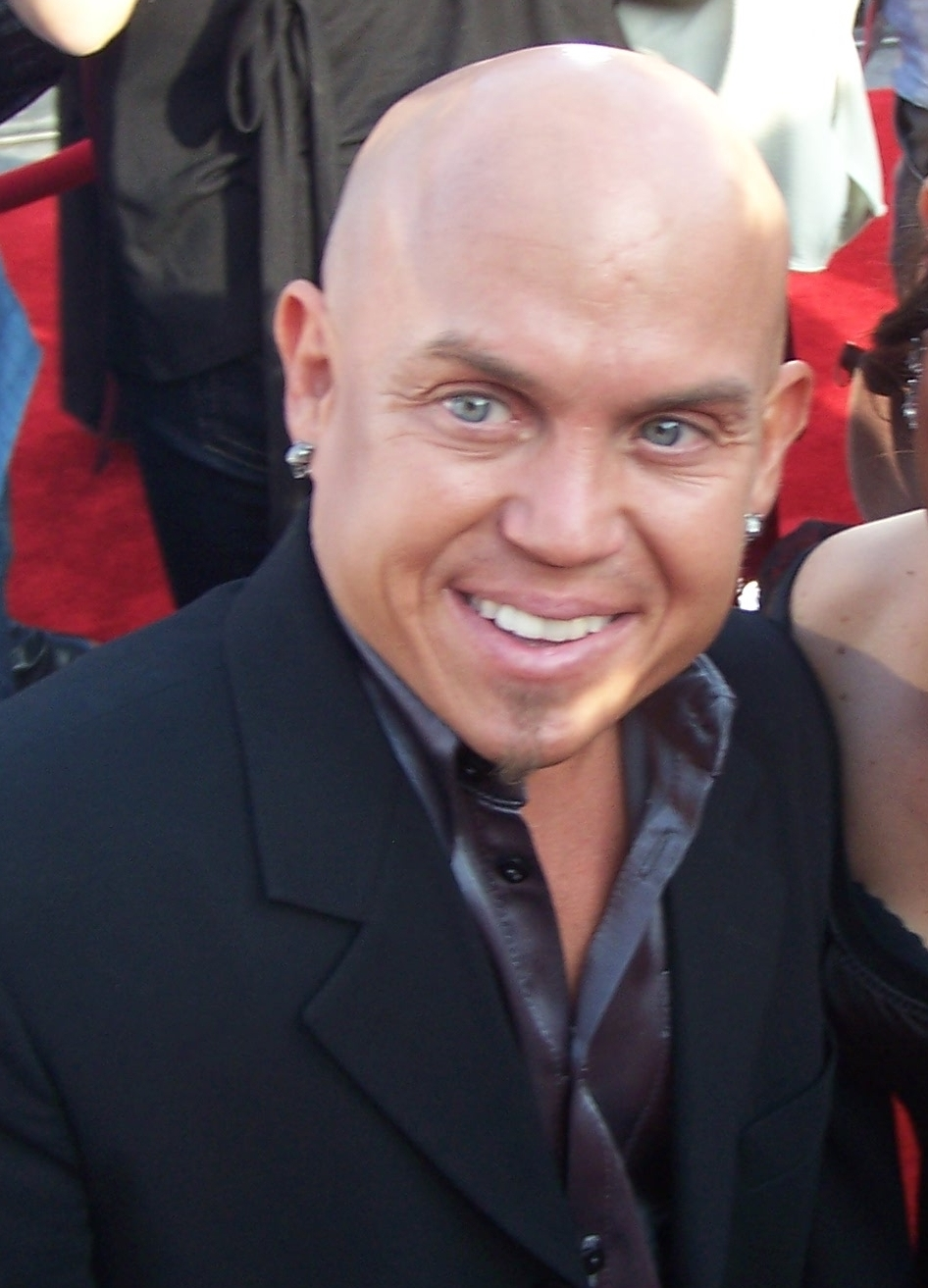
Johnny Depp, Geoffrey Rush, Kevin McNally, Orlando Bloom, Keira Knightley, and Martin Klebba appeared in four films. Only Depp, Rush, and McNally reprised their roles in all five films.

Pirates of the Caribbean films
| Film | U.S. release date | Directed by | Screenplay by | Story by | Produced by |
|---|---|---|---|---|---|
| Pirates of the Caribbean: The Curse of the Black Pearl | July 9, 2003 | Gore Verbinski | Ted Elliott & Terry Rossio | Ted Elliott, Terry Rossio, Jay Wolpert & Stuart Beattie | Jerry Bruckheimer |
| Pirates of the Caribbean: Dead Man's Chest | July 7, 2006 | Gore Verbinski | Ted Elliott & Terry Rossio | Ted Elliott & Terry Rossio | Jerry Bruckheimer |
| Pirates of the Caribbean: At World's End | May 25, 2007 | Gore Verbinski | Ted Elliott & Terry Rossio | Ted Elliott & Terry Rossio | Jerry Bruckheimer |
| Pirates of the Caribbean: On Stranger Tides | May 20, 2011 | Rob Marshall | Ted Elliott & Terry Rossio | Ted Elliott & Terry Rossio | Jerry Bruckheimer |
| Pirates of the Caribbean: Dead Men Tell No Tales | May 26, 2017 | Espen Sandberg & Joachim Rønning | Jeff Nathanson | Jeff Nathanson & Terry Rossio | Jerry Bruckheimer |

=== Pirates of the Caribbean: The Curse of the Black Pearl (2003) ===
Blacksmith Will Turner teams up with eccentric pirate Captain Jack Sparrow to save Turner's love, Elizabeth Swann, from cursed pirates led by Jack's mutinous former first mate, Hector Barbossa. Jack wants revenge against Barbossa, who left him stranded on an island before stealing his ship, the Black Pearl, along with 882 pieces of cursed Aztec Gold.

=== Pirates of the Caribbean: Dead Man's Chest (2006) ===
Lord Cutler Beckett of the East India Trading Company arrests Will and Elizabeth for aiding Captain Jack Sparrow in the previous film. Beckett offers clemency if Will agrees to search for Jack's compass in a bid to find the Dead Man's Chest—and inside, the heart of villainous Davy Jones—which would give Beckett control of the seas. However, Jack wants the Chest to escape from an unpaid debt with Jones, who made Jack captain of the Black Pearl for 13 years in exchange for 100 years of service aboard Jones' ship, the Flying Dutchman. Jack's debt is complicated by both Will Turner and Elizabeth Swann, who follow him out to sea.

=== Pirates of the Caribbean: At World's End (2007) ===
Lord Beckett gains power over Davy Jones and, with the help of the Flying Dutchman, he is now executing his plans to extinguish piracy forever. To stand against the East India Trading Co., Will, Elizabeth, Barbossa, and the crew of the Black Pearl set out to rescue Captain Jack Sparrow from Davy Jones' Locker. As one of the Nine Pirate Lords, Jack is needed in order to release an ancient goddess with the power to defeat Beckett's forces.

=== Pirates of the Caribbean: On Stranger Tides (2011) ===
Captain Jack Sparrow is on a quest to find the fabled Fountain of Youth and crosses paths with a former lover, Angelica. She forces Jack aboard the Queen Anne's Revenge, a ship captained by the infamous pirate Blackbeard, Angelica's father. Both are also in search of the Fountain: Angelica to save her father's soul, Blackbeard to escape a prophecy of his demise at the hands of a one-legged man. Joining the hunt is former pirate captain Barbossa, now a privateer in King George II's Navy, who is in a race against the Spanish for the Fountain of Youth.

The film is based on the 1987 novel On Stranger Tides by Tim Powers.

=== Pirates of the Caribbean: Dead Men Tell No Tales (2017) ===
A group of ghostly Spanish Navy soldiers led by Jack Sparrow's old nemesis, Captain Armando Salazar, escape from the Devil's Triangle, with the goal of killing every pirate at sea, including Sparrow. To survive, Sparrow seeks out the legendary Trident of Poseidon, a powerful artifact whose owner can control the seas and break curses. The film was released in many countries as Pirates of the Caribbean: Salazar's Revenge.

=== Future ===
==== Untitled sixth film (TBA) ====
Shortly before the release of On Stranger Tides, it was reported that Disney was planning to shoot the fifth and the sixth films back-to-back, although ultimately only the fifth installment was developed. By March 2017, director Joachim Rønning stated that Dead Men Tell No Tales was only the beginning of the final adventure, confirming that it would not be the last film of the series. That September, producer Jerry Bruckheimer indicated that another Pirates of the Caribbean was still in development. In October of the same year, Kaya Scodelario stated that she was contractually signed to return for a second film. Rønning was reportedly set to direct the film.

In 2018, a sixth film was still in the works at Disney. That same year, Keira Knightley said she did not see herself returning for another installment because she is a mother now and that the films take too long to shoot. In October 2019, Disney announced that Craig Mazin and Ted Elliott would write Pirates of the Caribbean 6. In May 2020, Bruckheimer commented that the first draft of the screenplay for the sixth film would soon be finished. On April 20, 2022, during his defamation trial against ex-wife Amber Heard, Depp stated he had no intention of returning to the franchise, citing his strained relationship with Disney after they had removed him from the franchise before a verdict was reached in the case.

In February 2023, Orlando Bloom had expressed interest in returning to the franchise. In March, Keira Knightley explained to Entertainment Tonight why she would not make a return to the Disney franchise. "What about Elizabeth Swann?", Knightley joked when asked if she would re-join the crew, also commenting that her character sailed away "in brilliant style". Bruckheimer was also still interested in potentially bringing back Depp to the saga. In June, Depp was reportedly open to returning to the series if the project proves worthwhile.

In August 2023, Craig Mazin stated that he had pitched a Pirates script to Disney, but that he would only commit to it if he was able to work with Ted Elliot; Mazin confirmed that his and Elliot's script was bought by Disney, also commenting that it was "too weird", but the 2023 Writers Guild of America strike had slowed development of the sixth installment.

In March 2024, Bruckheimer stated that the sixth film would be a reboot. Despite this, two months later, Bruckheimer hoped to see Depp return.

On May 20, 2024, in an interview with Entertainment Weekly, Bruckheimer provided further clarification on the series's status. Bruckheimer confirmed that, in addition to Elliott now writing National Treasure 3, there were two different Pirates movies in development. The first is a reboot that he intends to produce with scriptwriter Jeff Nathanson, and the second is the Margot Robbie film that will be penned by Christina Hodson. He stated that he hoped both films would be made, and noted that he thought Disney was receptive to the Robbie-led film. In regards to the reboot, he confirmed that it would not follow characters from the previous films, but stated that he hoped Depp would make an appearance.

On December 4, 2024, a Variety article mentioned that Bruckheimer was developing two separate scripts, one of which featured Depp.

In June 2025, Bruckheimer said the sixth film would feature returning cast members and new faces. When asked if he would return for another film, Bloom said, "I think they're trying to work out what it would all look like, I personally think it'd be great to get the band back together. That would be great, but there are always different ideas, and so we'll see where it lands." In August of that year, when asked if Depp would return for the sixth film, Bruckheimer said, "If he likes the way the part's written, I think he would do it. It's all about what's on the page, as we all know."

In September 2025, during TheWrap's The Grill conference, producer Jerry Bruckheimer provided updates on the planned sixth installment in the Pirates of the Caribbean franchise. "We're working on a script," Bruckheimer said, before noting that the project would not move forward until he and his collaborators were happy with what has been written. "If we don't have it on the page, it's not gonna get on the screen. We had two scripts at one point, and then one kind of dropped out and we kind of went with the other one." When asked about the past iterations of the still-developing sequel, Bruckheimer revealed that Margot Robbie was still involved and attached in some capacity to the franchise. The producer added that Pirates franchise veteran Ted Elliott contributed to the current script. "He worked on it, and we've brought someone else in to fill in the blanks." While he shared updates about National Treasure 3, reflecting on the franchises that have been the most difficult for him to keep going, Bruckheimer confessed and observed, "The hardest one has been 'Pirates' so far. That world is so cool and specific you just gotta find the right way in."

In February 2026, it was reported that a sixth Pirates of the Caribbean film was a priority for the new Disney leadership, Josh D'Amaro as the CEO and Dana Walden as president and chief creative officer. According to Jeff Sneider, Krysty Wilson-Cairns is in talks to write the script, which would focus on Jack Sparrow's son, and likely Margot Robbie, though it is unknown if Johnny Depp will return. A few days later, in an interview with Nischelle Turner of Entertainment Tonight, Jerry Bruckheimer responded to the internet scoop, saying "They're close on part of it." As the matter was pressed further, Bruckheimer confirmed having had conversations with Margot Robbie, but debunked the rumor of Jack Sparrow's son.

At the 2026 Producers Guild Awards, Bruckheimer addressed reports that they would move on from Johnny Depp and introduce a new lead character. He dismissed the claims as inaccurate, stating that, "that's not true," and adding, "if it's up to me, he'll be in it," in reference to Depp's potential return to the franchise. In August 2026, Bruckheimer confirmed that Disney was in talks with Depp to return for a sixth film. The following month, Bloom was asked about a potential sixth film at the Toronto International Film Festival. He said, "I don’t know. I think nostalgia is such a big thing in the world today. So we keep harking back to these things, because of the nostalgia and what the feeling you had watching whatever your favorite thing was. There’s that kind of thing that I think we’re seeing in movies as well. So we'll see."

==== Spin-off films ====
In October 2018, it was reported that Disney had been looking for ways to make a sixth film in the franchise, bringing on Deadpool (2016) writers Rhett Reese and Paul Wernick though producer Jerry Bruckheimer was expected to return. However, in February 2019, Reese and Wernick departed the project and the project was cancelled.

A female-led spin-off was announced in June 2020, starring Margot Robbie with Christina Hodson writing the screenplay. The film is separate from the sixth film also being developed. Bruckheimer was attached as producer. In November 2022, Robbie said the project was not going forward. Bruckheimer then shared the following month that the project wasn't officially dead and that a sequel merely took priority. He then later reiterated that it will still be made and has a "very strong story" but also needs "a little more work".

In an interview with The Hollywood Reporter, Jerry Bruckheimer stated that another spin-off "with a younger cast" is in the works alongside the Margot Robbie spin-off.

In February 2024, it was rumored that Disney was considering Ayo Edebiri to "follow in Depp's footsteps" for the leading role, a character named "Anne" likely inspired by the real-life pirate Anne Bonny, in a tentatively titled Pirates 6, a female-fronted movie that centers on a younger cast of pirates searching for hidden treasure. In response to the debunked rumors that Ayo Edebiri would replace Johnny Depp as the new lead, Daniel Richtman commented, "It's not true, there's no 'Replacing Depp' or anything like that. She's only the 'Type' they're looking at for the lead in one of the planned spinoffs (not the Margot Robbie one)." However, none of that has been officially confirmed by Disney.

== Short film ==
=== Pirates of the Caribbean: Tales of the Code: Wedlocked (2011) ===
Pirates of the Caribbean: Tales of the Code: Wedlocked is a live-action short directed by James Ward Byrkit. There were many proposed titles, including Wedding Belles and Pirate Belles. Although it was only included as a special feature in the US 15-disc 3D Blu-ray/2D Blu-ray/DVD + Digital Copy box set that includes the first four films released on October 18, 2011, it was also released in the similar UK five-disc set. Jim Byrkit conceived the idea for a short film while on the Shipwreck Cove set Rick Heinrichs designed for Pirates of the Caribbean: At World's End (2007), a project which interested Brigham Taylor at Disney. Screenwriters Ted Elliott and Terry Rossio collaborated with Byrkit on the script, having envisioned something based on the Pirate Code Book as a device that could tie into other stories later. The short film was shot by cinematographer Nic Sadler. As the pirate cove sets from At World's End—where the short film takes place—were set to be demolished, the short project was prepped in a matter of days and shot over three days in late 2006. In 2023, Rossio wrote on Wordplay that Tales of the Code was designed to be a series of a few fun shorts to fill in the Pirates universe and add to the DVD extras section. He also said that, in addition to Wedlocked, there are a few scripts around that were a part of that process.

The short film Wedlocked serves as a prequel to Pirates of the Caribbean: The Curse of the Black Pearl, inspired by the auction scene in the Disneyland attraction. Two wenches believe they are both betrothed to Jack Sparrow, but he has secretly traded them to the auctioneer for a fancy hat. They think the auctioneer is raising money for them, when in actuality they are being sold as brides to the highest bidder. Wedlocked had several Pirates veterans reprise their roles, like Vanessa Branch as Giselle, Lauren Maher as Scarlett, and David Bailie reprising his role as Cotton. The 10 minute short also featured John Vickery as the auctioneer and Dale Dickey as Oona the wench, as well as three pirates—Marquis D'avis, Atencio, and Slurry Gibson—who are named after Marc Davis, Xavier Atencio, and Blaine Gibson, the Imagineers who worked on the original attraction.

== Cast and crew ==
=== Additional crew ===
| Occupation | Films | | | | |
| Occupation | The Curse of the Black Pearl | Dead Man's Chest | At World's End | On Stranger Tides | Dead Men Tell No Tales |
|---|---|---|---|---|---|
| Composer | Klaus Badelt | Hans Zimmer | Hans Zimmer | Hans Zimmer | Geoff Zanelli |
| Editor(s) | Craig Wood, Arthur Schmidt & Stephen Rivkin | Craig Wood & Stephen Rivkin | Craig Wood & Stephen Rivkin | Wyatt Smith & David Brenner | Roger Barton & Leigh Folsom Boyd |
| Cinematographer | Dariusz Wolski | Dariusz Wolski | Dariusz Wolski | Dariusz Wolski | Paul Cameron |
| Production companies | Walt Disney Pictures & Jerry Bruckheimer Films | Walt Disney Pictures & Jerry Bruckheimer Films | Walt Disney Pictures & Jerry Bruckheimer Films | Walt Disney Pictures & Jerry Bruckheimer Films | Walt Disney Pictures & Jerry Bruckheimer Films |
| Distributor | Buena Vista Pictures Distribution | Buena Vista Pictures Distribution | Buena Vista Pictures Distribution | Walt Disney Studios Motion Pictures | Walt Disney Studios Motion Pictures |

== Production ==
=== Development ===
==== First film ====
Back in the early 1990s, Michael Frost Beckner and James Gorman pitched the script that would become Cutthroat Island to Michael Eisner as a potential Pirates of the Caribbean film, buoyed by support from development staff at Disney. Eisner turned it down, due to not wanting to mix the company's film and theme park divisions. Almost a decade later, Walt Disney Pictures had Jay Wolpert write a script based on the Pirates of the Caribbean ride in 2001, which was based on a story created by Disney executives Brigham Taylor, Michael Haynes, and Josh Harmon. Stuart Beattie stated that he talked about making a pirate movie based on the ride while tossing a frisbee with a friend, and wrote a first draft titled "Quest for the Caribbean" while on exchange to Oregon State University in 1991.

Screenwriters Ted Elliott and Terry Rossio notably thought about the pirate genre based on the ride during the early 1990s, having pitched the idea after completing work on the 1992 film Aladdin as a premise to studio executives, but there was no interest from any studio. Undeterred, the writing team refused to give up the dream, waiting for a studio to pick up their take on a pirate tale. Producer Jerry Bruckheimer rejected Wolpert's script, feeling it was "a straight pirate movie". In March 2002, Disney brought Beattie in to rewrite the script, due to his knowledge of piracy. Later that month Elliott and Rossio were brought in, having worked with Disney in Aladdin and the 2002 film Treasure Planet, among other successful films. Elliott and Rossio, inspired by the opening narration of the Pirates of the Caribbean ride, decided to give the film a supernatural edge.

In June 2002, Gore Verbinski signed on to direct Pirates of the Caribbean, and Johnny Depp and Geoffrey Rush signed on the following month to star. Verbinski was attracted to the idea of using modern technology to resurrect a genre, one that had disappeared after the Golden Age of Hollywood, and recalled his childhood memories of the ride, feeling the film was an opportunity to pay tribute to the "scary and funny" tone of it. Depp was attracted to the story as he found it quirky: rather than trying to find treasure, the crew of the Black Pearl were trying to return it in order to lift their curse, with the traditional mutiny having already taken place. Depp based Captain Jack Sparrow on a combination of The Rolling Stones guitarist Keith Richards and Looney Tunes cartoons, specifically the characters Bugs Bunny and Pepé Le Pew. Verbinski approached Rush for the role of Captain Barbossa, whom Depp named "Hector" behind the scenes, as he knew he would not play it with attempts at complexity, but with a simple villainy that would suit the story's tone.

Orlando Bloom read the script after Rush, with whom he was working on Ned Kelly, suggested it to him, and was cast as Will Turner. Keira Knightley came as a surprise to Verbinski: he had not seen her performance in Bend It Like Beckham and was impressed by her audition for Elizabeth Swann. Tom Wilkinson was one of several actors negotiated with to play Governor Swann, but the role went to Jonathan Pryce, whom Depp idolized. Further additions include Jack Davenport as James Norrington, Kevin R. McNally as Joshamee Gibbs, Zoe Saldaña as Anamaria, Lee Arenberg and Mackenzie Crook as Pintel and Ragetti, David Bailie as Cotton, Martin Klebba as Marty, Giles New and Angus Barnett as Murtogg and Mullroy, Damian O'Hare as Lieutenant Gillette, and Greg Ellis as then-unnamed Theodore Groves.

While Dick Cook had been a strong proponent of adapting Disney's rides into films, the box-office failure of The Country Bears (2002) made Michael Eisner and Robert Iger attempt to shut down production of Pirates of the Caribbean. Although Bruckheimer was Disney's most reliable and successful producer, Eisner second-guessed the early footage, complaining about Depp's character, and as the budget rose, threatened to cancel the film. However, Verbinski told his concept artists to keep working, and Bruckheimer changed the executives' minds when he showed them concept art and animatics. As recalled in the book DisneyWar, Eisner asked "Why does it have to cost so much?". Bruckheimer replied, "Your competition is spending $150 million," referring to franchises like The Lord of the Rings and The Matrix. Eisner concurred, but with the stigma attached to theme-park adaptations, Eisner requested that Verbinski and Bruckheimer remove some of the more overt references to the ride in the script, such as a scene where Sparrow and Turner enter the cave via a waterfall. Another change made was adding The Curse of the Black Pearl as a subtitle, should the film be a hit and lend itself to sequels like Raiders of the Lost Ark, which brought protest due to the Black Pearl being the name of the ship and nothing to do with the pirates' curse. Although Verbinski thought the subtitle was nonsense, Eisner refused to back down, and The Curse of the Black Pearl remained the subtitle, though on most posters and trailers the words were so small as to be barely visible.

Shooting for The Curse of the Black Pearl began on October 9, 2002, and wrapped by March 7, 2003. Before its release, many executives and journalists had expected the film to flop, as the pirate genre had not been successful for years, the film was based on a theme-park ride, and Depp rarely made a big film. However, The Curse of the Black Pearl became both a critical and commercial success.

==== Second and third films ====
After seeing how well the first film was made, the cast and crew signed for two sequels to be shot back-to-back, a practical decision on Disney's part to allow more time with the same cast and crew. Writers Ted Elliott and Terry Rossio knew that with an ensemble cast, they weren't free to invent totally different situations and characters, as with the Indiana Jones and James Bond series, and so had to retroactively turn The Curse of the Black Pearl into the first of a trilogy. They wanted to explore the reality of what would happen after Will Turner and Elizabeth Swann's embrace at the end of the first film, and initially considered the Fountain of Youth as the plot device. They settled on introducing the Flying Dutchman, the Kraken, and Davy Jones's locker, a mythology mentioned twice in the first film. Also only mentioned in the first film, a fictionalized East India Trading Company was introduced as the primary antagonists, which for them represented a counterpoint to the personal freedom represented by pirates, which was represented by a fictionalized Brethren of the Coast. Each of the cast of characters reprise their roles in the Pirates sequels, respectively, and saw the additions of Tom Hollander as Lord Cutler Beckett, Stellan Skarsgård as Bootstrap Bill Turner, Naomie Harris as Tia Dalma, and Bill Nighy as Davy Jones. Further additions include Chow Yun-Fat as Sao Feng and Keith Richards as Jack Sparrow's father, Captain Teague.

In November 2006, near the end of filming the Pirates trilogy, it was reported that Keira Knightley didn't want to participate in any further sequels. Both Knightley and Orlando Bloom had repeatedly been quoted in saying they were done with Pirates, noting that there was closure for Will Turner and Elizabeth Swann in At World's End, was quoted in saying they wanted to move on from the franchise. Whereas Johnny Depp was more interested in returning as Captain Jack Sparrow, having been quoted that it was a "break, or a hiatus" as he wrapped his last day on set.

Filming for the sequels began on February 28, 2005, with Dead Man's Chest finishing on March 1, 2006, and At World's End on January 10, 2007. The second film was the first Disney theatrical feature film with the computer-generated Walt Disney Pictures logo.

==== Fourth film ====
With the stories of both Will Turner (Orlando Bloom) and Elizabeth Swann (Keira Knightley) resolved in At World's End, as well as both actors having declined involvement, this forced a new approach while retaining some of the franchise favorites, particularly Pirates veterans Captain Jack Sparrow (Johnny Depp), Captain Hector Barbossa (Geoffrey Rush), and Joshamee Gibbs (Kevin R. McNally) from the original trilogy. Ted Elliott and Terry Rossio discovered the novel On Stranger Tides by Tim Powers during production of Dead Man's Chest and At World's End, and decided to use it as the basis for a fourth film. As Gore Verbinski was unavailable, Bruckheimer and Depp invited Rob Marshall to direct the film. Elliott and Rossio decided to do a stand-alone sequel, with a story that would support new characters, and incorporate elements from the novel, such as Edward "Blackbeard" Teach, the Fountain of Youth and mermaids—the latter two having been already alluded to in the previous films.

Depp, Rush, McNally, Keith Richards, Greg Ellis, and Damian O'Hare returned to their roles from previous films in Pirates of the Caribbean: On Stranger Tides, and the cast saw the additions of Ian McShane as Blackbeard and Penélope Cruz as Angelica, Jack Sparrow's love interest and Blackbeard's daughter. Further additions include Sam Claflin as the missionary Philip Swift, Àstrid Bergès-Frisbey as the mermaid Syrena, Stephen Graham as Scrum, Richard Griffiths as King George II, and Óscar Jaenada as The Spaniard. After the costly production of two simultaneous films, Disney tried to scale down the fourth installment, giving a lower budget, which led to cheaper locations and fewer scenes with special effects. However, with a budget of $378.5 million, On Stranger Tides is one of the most expensive films ever made.

Filming for On Stranger Tides began on June 14, and ended on November 19, 2010. It was also filmed in 3D, with cameras similar to the ones used in Avatar. It was released in the United States on May 20, 2011.

==== Fifth film ====
In January 2011, Terry Rossio was confirmed to write the screenplay for the fifth installment, but without his co-writer Ted Elliott. Rossio's script was ultimately discarded, and the writer stated that a major reason was its use of a female villain, which made actor Johnny Depp "worried that would be redundant to Dark Shadows, which also featured a female villain." Following the film's theatrical release in 2017, Rossio released his unproduced screenplay on his website Wordplay, which includes the proposed story and additional information in extensive footnotes.

In January 2013, Disney hired Jeff Nathanson to write the script for the film. Nathanson's script featured the Trident of Poseidon, loosely based on the Trident of Neptune from Rossio's script. Norwegian directors Joachim Rønning and Espen Sandberg were reportedly selected to direct in May 2013. By August 2013, Rønning and Sandberg confirmed their involvement, and praised Nathanson's "funny and touching" script, also being inspired by the first film of the franchise. The directing duo also confirmed that the title of the fifth film would be Dead Men Tell No Tales, alluding to the line well known from the theme-park attraction, and that it would be both a stand-alone adventure and tie into the overall mythology of the series. Disney pushed back the originally announced 2015 release date to a Summer 2016 release. Script issues were reportedly behind the delay, as both the studio and filmmakers were reportedly not happy with Nathanson's initial draft, but Bruckheimer revealed Nathanson was at work on a second attempt based on the well-received outline.

Depp, Rush, McNally, Stephen Graham, Martin Klebba, Giles New and Angus Barnett returned to their roles from previous films, and the cast saw the additions of Javier Bardem as the Spanish Navy Captain Armando Salazar, Brenton Thwaites as Henry Turner, and Kaya Scodelario as Carina Smyth. Further additions include Golshifteh Farahani as the sea witch Shansa, David Wenham as Royal Navy Lieutenant John Scarfield, and a cameo role by The Beatles musician Paul McCartney as Jack Sparrow's namesake, Uncle Jack. Despite the studio and producer guideline that Keira Knightley and Orlando Bloom would not return, as well as the actors' initial comments about returning to their roles after At World's End, Elizabeth Swann and Will Turner returned in cameo appearances in Dead Men Tell No Tales.

The film was shot in Australia after the government agreed to repurpose $20 million of tax incentives originally intended for the remake of 20,000 Leagues Under the Sea. Village Roadshow Studios and Port Douglas were used as filming locations. Production began in Australia on February 17, 2015, and wrapped on July 9. Although the scheduled theatrical release was on July 7, 2017, among other previously announced and subsequently delayed released dates, Dead Men Tell No Tales was released on May 26, 2017. The film was also given an alternative title, Salazar's Revenge, for marketing purposes in selected European, South American, and Asian countries.

== Reception ==
=== Box office performance ===
| Film | U.S. release date | Box office gross | | | All-time Ranking | | Budget | Ref. |
| Film | U.S. release date | North America | Other territories | Worldwide | North America | Worldwide | Budget | Ref. |
|---|---|---|---|---|---|---|---|---|
| The Curse of the Black Pearl | July 9, 2003 | $305,413,918 | $348,850,097 | $654,264,015 | 99 | 161 | $140 million | |
| Dead Man's Chest | July 7, 2006 | $423,315,812 | $642,863,935 | $1,066,179,747 | 33 | 41 | $225 million | |
| At World's End | May 25, 2007 | $309,420,425 | $652,270,784 | $961,691,209 | 97 | 60 | $300 million | |
| On Stranger Tides | May 20, 2011 | $241,071,802 | $805,649,464 | $1,046,721,266 | 157 | 44 | $378.5 million | |
| Dead Men Tell No Tales | May 26, 2017 | $172,558,876 | $623,363,422 | $795,922,298 | 319 | 103 | $230–320 million | |
| Total | | $1,451,780,833 | $3,072,997,702 | $4,524,778,535 | 15 | 15 | $1.274–1.364 billion | |

The Pirates of the Caribbean film series was successful at the box office, with each film grossing over $650 million, and all but Dead Men Tell No Tales at some point ranking among the fifty highest-grossing films of all time. It became the first ever series to have multiple films passing the billion dollar mark in box office revenues with Dead Man's Chest and On Stranger Tides, since followed by other film franchises.

The Curse of the Black Pearl was the third-highest-grossing 2003 film in North America, behind The Lord of the Rings: The Return of the King and Finding Nemo, and fourth worldwide, behind The Return of the King, Finding Nemo and The Matrix Reloaded. Dead Man's Chest was the most successful film of 2006 worldwide. At World's End led the worldwide grosses in 2007, though being only fourth in North America, behind Spider-Man 3, Shrek the Third and Transformers.

On Stranger Tides was the third-highest-grossing film of 2011 worldwide, behind Harry Potter and the Deathly Hallows – Part 2 and Transformers: Dark of the Moon, and the fifth in North America. The first three sequels broke box office records upon release, of which the most notable are the opening-weekend record in North America (Dead Man's Chest), the Memorial-Day weekend record in North America (At World's End) and the opening-weekend record outside North America (On Stranger Tides).

=== Critical and public response ===
| Film | Rotten Tomatoes | Metacritic | CinemaScore |
|---|---|---|---|
| The Curse of the Black Pearl | 79% (216 reviews) | 63 (40 reviews) | A |
| Dead Man's Chest | 53% (228 reviews) | 53 (37 reviews) | A– |
| At World's End | 43% (224 reviews) | 50 (36 reviews) | A– |
| On Stranger Tides | 32% (271 reviews) | 45 (39 reviews) | B+ |
| Dead Men Tell No Tales | 30% (291 reviews) | 39 (45 reviews) | A– |

The series is noted for its high quality of acting talent. The visual and practical effects are considered some of the best ever done on film, so much so that audiences believed certain CGI elements of the films were real and done practically. However, the plots of the four sequels have received mixed reviews, with the general consensus that they are too bloated and convoluted to follow. Pirates of the Caribbean is noted for reinvigorating the pirate film genre after decades of either no pirate films or failed pirate films. The success of the series saw Disney and Jerry Bruckheimer try to replicate the franchise's success by releasing other big budget adventure films such as Prince of Persia: The Sands of Time and The Lone Ranger, the latter of which was directed by Gore Verbinski. Both of them have failed to achieve critical or financial success.

=== Accolades ===
==== Academy Awards ====
Together, the first three films were nominated for a total of 11 Academy Awards, of which a single award was won.

| Award | Film | | | | |
| Award | The Curse of the Black Pearl | Dead Man's Chest | At World's End | On Stranger Tides | Dead Men Tell No Tales |
|---|---|---|---|---|---|
| Best Actor | Nominated (Johnny Depp) | | | | |
| Best Art Direction | | Nominated | | | |
| Best Makeup | Nominated | | Nominated | | |
| Best Sound Editing | Nominated | Nominated | | | |
| Best Sound Mixing | Nominated | Nominated | | | |
| Best Visual Effects | Nominated | Won | Nominated | | |

==== Golden Globe Awards ====
Together, all the five films were nominated for a total of 2 Golden Globe Awards, of which neither were won.

| Award | Film | | | | |
| Award | The Curse of the Black Pearl | Dead Man's Chest | At World's End | On Stranger Tides | Dead Men Tell No Tales |
|---|---|---|---|---|---|
| Best Actor in a Motion Picture – Comedy or Musical | Nominated (Johnny Depp) | Nominated (Johnny Depp) | | | |

==== Golden Raspberry Awards ====
| Award | Film | | | | |
| Award | The Curse of the Black Pearl | Dead Man's Chest | At World's End | On Stranger Tides | Dead Men Tell No Tales |
|---|---|---|---|---|---|
| Worst Actor | | | | | Nominated (Johnny Depp) (Note: Referred to as Pirates of the Caribbean XIII: Dead Careers Tell No Tales on the official nomination list.) |
| Worst Supporting Actor | | | Nominated (Orlando Bloom) | | Nominated (Javier Bardem) |
| Worst Screen Combo | | | | | Nominated (Johnny Depp) |

==== MTV Movie Awards ====
Together, all the first three films were nominated for a total of 13 MTV Movie Awards, of which 4 were won.

| Award | Film | | | | |
| Award | The Curse of the Black Pearl | Dead Man's Chest | At World's End | On Stranger Tides | Dead Men Tell No Tales |
|---|---|---|---|---|---|
| Best Movie | Nominated | Won | Nominated | | |
| Best Male Performance | Won (Johnny Depp) | Won (Johnny Depp) | | | |
| Best Female Performance | | Nominated (Keira Knightley) | Nominated (Keira Knightley) | | |
| Best Breakthrough Female Performance | Nominated (Keira Knightley) | | | | |
| Best On-Screen Team | Nominated (Johnny Depp & Orlando Bloom) | | | | |
| Best Villain | Nominated (Geoffrey Rush) | Nominated (Bill Nighy) | | | |
| Best Comedic Performance | Nominated (Johnny Depp) | | Won (Johnny Depp) | | |

==== Teen Choice Awards ====
Together, the first four films were nominated for a total of 32 Teen Choice Awards, of which 17 were won.

| Award | Film | | | | |
| Award | The Curse of the Black Pearl | Dead Man's Chest | At World's End | On Stranger Tides | Dead Men Tell No Tales |
|---|---|---|---|---|---|
| Choice Movie: Chemistry | Won (Orlando Bloom & Keira Knightley) | | | | |
| Choice Movie: Fight/Action Sequence | Won (Johnny Depp vs Geoffrey Rush) | | | | |
| Choice Movie: Liar | Won (Johnny Depp) | | | | |
| Choice Movie: Liplock | Won (Orlando Bloom & Keira Knightley) | Won (Orlando Bloom & Keira Knightley) | | | Nominated (Orlando Bloom & Keira Knightley) |
| Choice Movie: Female Breakout Star | Nominated (Keira Knightley) | | | | |
| Choice Movie Actor | | Won (Johnny Depp) | Won (Johnny Depp) | Nominated (Johnny Depp) | Nominated (Johnny Depp) |
| Choice Movie Actor | | Nominated (Orlando Bloom) | Nominated (Orlando Bloom) | Nominated (Johnny Depp) | Nominated (Brenton Thwaites) |
| Choice Summer Movie | | Won | | | Nominated |
| Choice Movie: Scream | | Won (Keira Knightley) | | | |
| Choice Movie | | Won | Won | Nominated | Nominated |
| Choice Movie: Rumble | | Won (Orlando Bloom & Jack Davenport) | Won (Orlando Bloom) | | |
| Choice Movie: Hissy Fit | | Won (Keira Knightley) | | | |
| Choice Male Hottie | | Nominated (Orlando Bloom) | | | |
| Choice Movie Actress | | Nominated (Keira Knightley) | Won (Keira Knightley) | Nominated (Penélope Cruz) | Nominated (Kaya Scodelario) |
| Choice Movie: Villain | | Won (Bill Nighy) | Won (Bill Nighy) | Nominated (Ian McShane) | Nominated (Javier Bardem) |

== Music ==
=== Soundtracks ===
| Title | U.S. release date | Length | Label |
|---|---|---|---|
| Pirates of the Caribbean: The Curse of the Black Pearl (Original Soundtrack) | July 22, 2003 | 43:50 | Walt Disney Records |
| Pirates of the Caribbean: Dead Man's Chest (Soundtrack from the Motion Picture) | July 4, 2006 | 58:32 | Walt Disney Records |
| Pirates of the Caribbean: At World's End (Soundtrack from the Motion Picture) | May 22, 2007 | 55:50 | Walt Disney Records |
| Pirates of the Caribbean: On Stranger Tides (Soundtrack from the Motion Picture) | May 17, 2011 | 77:11 | Walt Disney Records |
| Pirates of the Caribbean: Dead Men Tell No Tales (Soundtrack from the Motion Picture) | May 25, 2017 | 75:20 | Walt Disney Records |

== See also ==
- List of Pirates of the Caribbean cast members
