= Pirates of the Caribbean: Soundtrack Treasures Collection =

Pirates of The Caribbean: Soundtrack Treasures Collection

Compilation album by Klaus Badelt / Hans Zimmer
- Released: December 4, 2007
- Recorded: 2003–2007
- Genre: Soundtrack
- Label: Walt Disney
- Producer: Various

Pirates of the Caribbean chronology
At World's End Remixes (2007)	Pirates of The Caribbean: Soundtrack Treasures Collection (2007)	On Stranger Tides (2011)

Pirates of the Caribbean: Soundtrack Treasures Collection is a collection of soundtrack albums from Walt Disney's Pirates of the Caribbean trilogy along with some exclusive extra features including several suites of never-before-released music and a bonus DVD containing videos from behind the scenes, making of the music and interviews with composer Hans Zimmer. The set was released on December 4, 2007.

== Track listing ==
Disc One: The Curse of the Black Pearl (Klaus Badelt)

1. Fog Bound (2:17)
2. The Medallion Calls (1:53)
3. The Black Pearl (2:17)
4. Will and Elizabeth (2:08)
5. Swords Crossed (3:16)
6. Walk the Plank (1:59)
7. Barbossa is Hungry (4:06)
8. Blood Ritual (3:33)
9. Moonlight Serenade (2:09)
10. To the Pirates' Cave! (3:31)
11. Skull and Crossbones (3:24)
12. Bootstrap's Bootstraps (2:39)
13. Underwater March (4:13)
14. One Last Shot (4:46)
15. He's a Pirate (1:31)

Disc Two: Dead Man's Chest (Hans Zimmer)

1. Jack Sparrow (6:06)
2. The Kraken (6:55)
3. Davy Jones (3:15)
4. I've Got My Eye On You (2:25)
5. Dinner Is Served (1:30)
6. Tia Dalma (3:57)
7. Two Hornpipes (Tortuga) (1:14)
8. A Family Affair (3:34)
9. Wheel of Fortune (6:45)
10. You Look Good Jack (5:34)
11. Hello Beastie (10:15)
12. He's A Pirate (Tiësto Remix) (7:02)

Disc Three: At World's End (Hans Zimmer)

1. Hoist the Colours (1:31)
2. Singapore (3:40)
3. At Wit's End (8:05)
4. Multiple Jacks (3:51)
5. Up Is Down (2:42)
6. I See Dead People in Boats (7:09)
7. The Brethren Court (2:21)
8. Parlay (2:10)
9. Calypso (3:02)
10. What Shall We Die For (2:02)
11. I Don't Think Now Is the Best Time (10:45)
12. One Day (4:01)
13. Drink Up Me Hearties (4:31)

Disc Four:

1. Pirates, Day One, 4:56am (3:46)
2. Marry Me (11:37)
3. The Heart Of Davy Jones (3:14)
4. Lord Cutler Beckett (8:47)
5. Jack's Theme Bare Bones Demo (4:05)
6. Hoist The Colours Suite (5:43)
7. The Pirate Lord Of Singapore (5:58)
8. Just Good Business (5:56)
9. He's A Pirate (Pete n' Red's Jolly Roger Mix) (3:12)
10. He's A Pirate (Friscia & Lamboy Tribal Treasure Mix) (4:38)
11. He's A Pirate (Pelo Verde Mix) (4:39)
12. He's A Pirate (Chris Joss Ship Ahoy Tribal Mix) (4:03)
13. Jack's Suite (Paul OakenfoId Mix) (3:34)
14. Jack's Suite (The Crystal Method Mix) (3:48)
15. Pirates Live Forever (Ryeland Allison Mix) (3:50)

Bonus DVD:

1. Chapter 1: Hans Zimmer: The Man Behind The Pirate's Music
2. Chapter 2: Making of A Score
3. Chapter 3: Premiere

== Description of Disc Four ==
The contents of the first three discs are identical to the previously released soundtrack albums. As hinted by Hans Zimmer in a podcast interview with SoundtrackNet, the fourth disc comes with several suites of music that contain Zimmer's original ideas for the second sequel's new themes:

- "Pirates, Day One 4:56am" is a shortened and edited version of the first demo Hans Zimmer wrote for The Curse of the Black Pearl.
- "Marry Me" is a combination of the "Love Theme" and its variations that was heard on the already released soundtrack to At World's End. A notable addition here is the inclusion of the music that's played during Jack and Elizabeth's parachute escape near the end of the film when Will dies but later comes back, as well as a slightly extended version of "Up Is Down". The last third was later used for On Stranger Tides (2011) scene where Jack leaves Angelica on an island in the middle of the ocean.
- "The Heart Of Davy Jones" contains string variations on the theme heard on Dead Man's Chest soundtrack. No Organs were used in this cue and the Music Box only makes a cameo appearance towards the end of the cue.
- "Lord Cutler Beckett" contains many different variations on Beckett's theme as heard in Dead Man's Chest and At World's End. Although some thematic ideas were used later on for the climactic battle scene of the second sequel, most of the ideas in this cue remained unused.
- "Jack's Theme Bare Bones Demo" is a solo Piano demo of what would become Jack Sparrow's theme suite in Dead Man's Chest.
- "Hoist The Colours Suite" is a slightly altered version of a same theme that appears in the end credits to At World's End.
- "The Pirate Lord of Singapore" is an extended version of "Singapore" that was released on At World's End. The lengthy cue builds the ideas of "Singapore" even further, however some of these ideas too were not used in the score for the final film. A very full track, utilizing traditional Asian instruments like the Gamelan and Er-Hu at the end of the track. Halfway through, a cello, bass and gamelan are heard in a traditional gritty Zimmer style motif. The cello and gamelan continue throughout the track doubling each other.
- "Just Good Business" A darker and more action oriented version of Beckett's theme music. This track is actually a shortened and edited version of a Suite by Lorne Balfe

The remix music were all previously released on Pirates Remixed and Pirates of the Caribbean: At World's End Remixes. These tracks are shortened edits of the original remixes contained on aforementioned releases.
