= Pirates of the Caribbean: On Stranger Tides (soundtrack) =

Pirates of the Caribbean: On Stranger Tides—Original Motion Picture Soundtrack

Soundtrack album by Hans Zimmer featuring Rodrigo y Gabriela
- Released: May 17, 2011
- Recorded: 2009–2011
- Studio: Sony Pictures Studios Scoring Stage; Air Lyndhurst Studios; Abbey Road Studios
- Genre: Film score
- Length: 77:11
- Label: Walt Disney
- Producer: Rob Marshall; Jerry Bruckheimer

Pirates of the Caribbean chronology
Soundtrack Treasures Collection (2007)	Pirates of the Caribbean: On Stranger Tides—Original Motion Picture Soundtrack (2011)	Dead Men Tell No Tales (2017)

Professional ratings
Review scores
Source	Rating
AllMusic	3.5/5 stars
Empire	4/5 stars
Filmtracks	1/5 stars
Movie Music UK	3/5 stars
Movie Wave	2/5 stars
Tracksounds	5/10 stars

Pirates of the Caribbean: On Stranger Tides—Original Motion Picture Soundtrack is the soundtrack album to the 2011 eponymous film. Hans Zimmer, who produced Klaus Badelt's score for The Curse of the Black Pearl and composed the music for Dead Man's Chest and At World's End, returned to score the fourth installment of the Pirates franchise. Collaborators included Rodrigo y Gabriela, which are listed as featured artists, and composers Eric Whitacre, Eduardo Cruz and Geoff Zanelli.

== Composition ==
Zimmer said that his music for the series is "making orchestras play rock 'n' roll" as he felt that "pirates were the rock 'n' rollers of many many years ago", and that he decided to add a "Spanish element" to On Stranger Tides.

Many musicians worked with Zimmer in the score. The biggest collaborators were Mexican duo Rodrigo y Gabriela, whose music Zimmer met after being given their album by a friend. Zimmer said they were picked for the soundtrack because the duo "play rock n' roll with flamenco guitars". American composer Eric Whitacre helped with choir-based songs, most notably the mermaid theme, and brought along his soprano wife, Hila Plitmann. Penélope Cruz's brother Eduardo Cruz wrote a tango song, and Geoff Zanelli contributed to many tracks. Trumpetist Arturo Sandoval is featured throughout the score. The music was recorded at the Sony Scoring Stage in Culver City, California, conducted by Nick Glennie-Smith, with Whitacre's choir being done at Abbey Road Studios.

To make the soundtrack album stand out, Zimmer tried to focus on the Rodrigo y Gabriela tracks, as well as providing remixes that "fit the themes". Seven remixes overall are featured. The soundtrack was released on May 17, 2011, three days before the US release of the film.

== Track listing ==
#	Title	Description	Length
1.	Guilty Of Being Innocent Of Being Jack Sparrow	This track consists mainly of variations of Jack's various themes, first heard in Fog Bound in The Curse of the Black Pearl and Jack Sparrow in Dead Man's Chest. It is heard during the first scene in London, during Joshamee Gibbs' trial in the Old Bailey. This track also plays during Jack Sparrow's first appearance in On Stranger Tides.	1:43
2.	Angelica	A suite of themes for the character of the same name in a Latin American style. At its simplest it is a very basic tango, featuring Rodrigo y Gabriela accompanied by a light string ensemble to connect it to the rest of the score. A variation of this track is played during the dance scene between Jack Sparrow & Angelica.	4:18
3.	Mutiny	Featuring Rodrigo y Gabriela. The track actually plays music from two separate scenes. The opening is a heavier and more sinister take on Angelica's theme music; this section of the track highlights the scene where Jack Sparrow realizes that Angelica is the first mate of the Queen Ann's Revenge. Around 21 seconds in and onward takes place exclusively during the Mutiny scene. The Mutiny sequence is a heavy action cue containing a mixture of new themes such as Angelica and a hint of Blackbeard's theme, and old action themes from curse of the black pearl such as He's a Pirate, Swords Crossed, and Bootstrap's Bootstraps. It's also interesting to note that the action portion of this track bears a close resemblance to an unreleased track from Curse of The Black Pearl, during the ship battle between the Black Pearl & the Interceptor.	2:49
4.	The Pirate That Should Not Be	A guitar arrangement featuring Rodrigo y Gabriela, containing statements of He's a Pirate. This track is album exclusive and doesn't appear in the film.	3:56
5.	Mermaids	The piece begins with a statement of a theme from 2:01 to 2:31 of "At Wit's End" from the third film. The main tune is sung by the mermaid choir in 3/4 time, and is supported by an arpeggio pattern on the harp. After a restatement of this theme the track moves into the new On Stranger Tides theme, again sung by the mermaid choir. The bass instruments play a deep pedal note to accompany this melody. There is then a third statement of the "At Wit's End" mermaid theme, followed by two more renditions of the On Stranger Tides theme (the latter version replacing the mermaid choir with strings, while the brass section takes over the pedal note). The track then becomes an action cue; a powerful and driving ostinato replaces the gentle scales and arpeggios, and the mermaid choir change from their lyrical melody to "shouting" chord notes. All of the action material is new. There is a brief action statement of Blackbeard's theme, followed by an abridged version of Beckett's death theme from "I Don't Think Now Is The Best Time", with Blackbeard's six-note figure overlaying it. There is then a powerful statement of the Queen Anne's Revenge theme, followed by Blackbeard's theme again (with a slightly altered rhythm on the last two chords) which rounds off the piece. This track takes place during the scene where the Mermaids are first introduced and when they attack Blackbeard's crew. The bit at 4:11 - 5:04 actually doesn't appear during the Mermaid fight sequence, it appears during the ending credits and some variations on it appear elsewhere in the film.	8:05
6.	South of Heaven's Chanting Mermaids	Featuring Rodrigo Y Gabriela. The track mainly consists of guitar arrangements, along with the main theme of "Mermaids" from the soundtrack. Towards the end, a violin can be heard accompanying the guitars. This track is album exclusive and no guitar arrangements of the Mermaid theme appear in the film.	5:49
7.	Palm Tree Escape	Featuring Rodrigo y Gabriela. This track plays during escape from the Palm Tree Grove. This track borrows heavily from earlier films, most notably Jack Sparrow's music from Dead Man's Chest as well as "Will & Elizabeth" and "He's a Pirate" from Curse of The Black Pearl.	3:06
8.	Blackbeard	This track consists of almost entirely new music, split into three parts. The first is an exposition of his new themes, marking Blackbeard's first appearance in On Stranger Tides. The powerful statement of the Queen Anne's Revenge theme can be heard when Blackbeard hangs the mutineers. The second is a jolly skipping arpeggio on the bass instruments with hints of the opening of "On Stranger Tides" suite, followed by a tragic re-orchestration of Blackbeard's theme, this plays during Blackbeard's death, where he realizes he has been tricked into sacrificing himself before being consumed by the Fountain.. The final section is another variation of the Queen Anne's Revenge theme before restating the three note descending figure heard throughout the franchise, this particular variation sounds very much like the end of "A Family Affair" from Dead Man's Chest. The final section accompanies the Cook's punishment by the Greek fire cannons. An interesting thing to note, the skipping arpeggio that plays just before Blackbeard's death is actually an unreleased track that plays in Dead Man's Chest, during the scene where Elizabeth was pulling the dress on a string to make the sailors think it was haunted.	5:06
9.	Angry and Dead Again	Featuring Rodrigo y Gabriela. This track is mostly unused within the film, with only a few themes making an appearance. The theme at 2:14 - 2:40 is played during the scene where Barbossa threatens Gibbs for the map and again when Barbossa plans an escape route through the Spanish camp. This theme sort of acts as a minor theme for Barbossa. The track closes off by reprising Jack Sparrow's heroic cue and he's a Pirate which are heard multiple times throughout the film. The ending section is also a guitar arrangement of the ending of Palm Tree Escape.	5:34
10.	On Stranger Tides	The track opens with the On Stranger Tides theme playing on strings, with an eerie ambiance in the background. After a brief section of filler music, the "Spanish theme" is stated for the first and only time on the album. The track is finished with a shorter version of the On Stranger Tides theme, accompanied by a wavering two note figure previously heard in "Mermaids" (which also uses the On Stranger Tides theme). The track plays during the film's opening sequence.	2:44
11.	End Credits	The track begins with He's a Pirate, which is identical to what's heard in the previous Pirates films, but with the addition of Rodrigo y Gabriela. The track then moves into Jack's action theme from "Jack Sparrow", with the Spanish guitars taking over the pedal note at the top, The track ends with another reprisal of He's a Pirate". This track is basically a mixture of Curse of The Black Pearls rendition of He's a Pirate and Dead Man's Chest unreleased variation.	2:00
12.	Guilty of Being Innocent of Being Jack Sparrow Remixed	A techno remix of the first track on the album. Remix by DJ Earworm.	2:46
13.	Angelica (Grant Us Peace Remix)	A techno remix of the Angelica Suite by Ki:Theory	3:09
14.	The Pirate That Should Not Be Remixed	A techno remix of "The Pirate That Should Not Be" by Photek (Rodrigo Sanchez, Gabriela Quintero and Hans Zimmer)	6:26
15.	Blackbeard Remixed	A techno remix of Blackbeard's theme by Super Mash Bros & Thieves	5:27
16.	South of Heaven's Chanting Mermaids Remixed	A techno remix of "South of Heaven's Chanting Mermaids" by Paper Diamond	3:33
17.	Palm Tree Escape Remixed	A techno remix of "Palm Tree Escape" by Adam Freeland (Hans Zimmer)	5:28
18.	Angry and Dead Again Remixed	A techno remix of "Angry and Dead Again" by Static Avenger (Rodrigo Sanchez, Gabriela Quintero and Hans Zimmer)	5:50

== Soundtrack charts ==
Chart (2011)	Peak position
Austrian Albums Chart	14
Belgian Albums Chart (Vl)	43
Belgian Albums Chart (Wa)	62
Dutch Albums Chart	76
French Albums Chart	70
German Albums Chart	31
Poland (OLiS)	26
Spanish Albums Chart	55
Swiss Albums Chart	20
US Billboard 200	45
US Digital Albums	18
US Top Soundtracks	3
