= Pirates of the Caribbean: At World's End Remixes =

EP by Hans Zimmer / Oakenfold / The Crystal Method
- Released: May 22, 2007
- Recorded: 2007
- Genre: Soundtrack
- Length: 26:05
- Label: Walt Disney
- Producer: Paul Oakenfold

Pirates of the Caribbean chronology
At World's End (2007)	Pirates of the Caribbean: At World's End Remixes (2007)	Soundtrack Treasures Collection (2007)

Pirates of the Caribbean: At World's End Remixes is an EP released in 2007 which features remixes by Paul Oakenfold and other DJs of the track "Jack Sparrow" composed by Hans Zimmer for the Disney film Pirates of the Caribbean: At World's End.

== Track listing ==
1. "Jack's Suite" (Paul Oakenfold Mix) – 6:51
2. "Jack's Suite" (Paul Oakenfold Mix Radio Edit) – 3:38
3. "Jack's Suite" (The Crystal Method Mix) – 6:04
4. "Jack's Suite" (The Crystal Method Mix Radio Edit) – 3:47
5. "Pirates Live Forever" (Ryeland Allison Remix) – 5:43
