= Pirates of the Caribbean Multiplayer Mobile =

2006 video game

- Developer: Floodgate Entertainment
- Publisher: Disney
- Platform: Mobile
- Release: July 2006 (United States)
- Genre: Massively multiplayer online game

Pirates of the Caribbean Multiplayer Mobile was a massively multiplayer mobile game based on the series of films and the Disney theme park attraction of the same name.

== Gameplay ==
The game featured several game modes in which players must achieve a variety of objectives, such as defeating the enemy team in battle, stealing the enemy fleet's flag and bringing it back to their own harbor, or being tasked with defending a port from an attacking enemy team who is tasked with plundering it.

== Reception ==
The game received a positive review from IGN who rated it 7.8 from 10.
