= Disney's Pirates of the Caribbean: Swashbuckling Sea Songs =

Compilation album by Various artists
- Released: February 13, 2007
- Label: Walt Disney
- Producer: Marco Marinangeli

Pirates of the Caribbean chronology
Dead Man's Chest (2006)	Disney's Pirates of the Caribbean: Swashbuckling Sea Songs (2007)	At World's End (2007)

Disney's Pirates of the Caribbean: Swashbuckling Sea Songs was released on CD in 2007, as part of a CD/DVD combo pack, packaged with Pirates of the Caribbean: Dead Man's Chest, and offered at Wal-Mart stores. The CD contained the following 14 tracks, by Various Artists.

1. Away, Away, Away (2:45)
2. Treasure (2:06)
3. The First Mate Is a Monkey (2:28)
4. Welcome to the Caribbean (2:57)
5. Stowaway Listen Listen (2:41)
6. The Legend of Davy Jones (Forty Fathoms Deep) (3:41)
7. Shiver My Timbers (2:18)
8. Yo, Ho, Ho (And a Bottle of Rum) (2:01)
9. Sailing for Adventure (2:33)
10. Blow the Man Down (2:51)
11. The Pirate King (2:22)
12. Pirates of the Black Tide (3:10)
13. Davy Jones' Locker (2:33)
14. Yo Ho (A Pirate's Life for Me) (5:43)
