= Pirates of the Caribbean: Dead Men Tell No Tales (soundtrack) =

Pirates of the Caribbean: Dead Men Tell No Tales—Original Motion Picture Soundtrack

Film score by Geoff Zanelli
- Released: May 26, 2017
- Genre: Film score
- Length: 1:11:32
- Label: Walt Disney
- Producer: Geoff Zanelli

Pirates of the Caribbean chronology
On Stranger Tides (2011)	Pirates of the Caribbean: Dead Men Tell No Tales—Original Motion Picture Soundtrack (2017)

Professional ratings
Review scores
Source	Rating
Filmtracks	3/5 stars

Pirates of the Caribbean: Dead Men Tell No Tales—Original Motion Picture Soundtrack is the film score album for the 2017 film of the same name. The music is arranged, composed and written by Geoff Zanelli. The album was released on May 26, 2017 by Walt Disney Records.

== Background ==
For the first time in the series since Pirates of the Caribbean: The Curse of the Black Pearl in 2003, which he co-wrote with Klaus Badelt, Hans Zimmer did not return to compose the music for the film. Instead, Geoff Zanelli, who worked on all previous four installments in the franchise, is the main composer for the film.

Zanelli said of taking over from Zimmer as composer for the series, "What Hans did for the Pirates movies redefined the sound of the entire genre, it has been very fulfilling to work alongside him and [producer] Jerry [Bruckheimer] on the past four films. Dead Men Tell No Tales enlarges the Pirates universe with many new, unique elements, and I'm building a distinctive sound for this film that springboards off of many years of collaborating in the Pirates world."

== Recording ==
The recording locations were Air Studios (London, UK), Henson Recording Studios (Los Angeles, CA), and Sony Scoring Stage (Culver City, CA).

== Track listing ==
All tracks are written by Geoff Zanelli.

No.	Title	Length
1.	"Dead Men Tell No Tales"	1:50
2.	"Salazar"	4:33
3.	"No Woman Has Ever Handled My Herschel"	3:58
4.	"You Speak of the Trident"	1:58
5.	"The Devil's Triangle"	2:45
6.	"Shansa"	3:12
7.	"Kill the Filthy Pirate, I'll Wait"	4:50
8.	"The Dying Gull"	1:00
9.	"El Matador del Mar"	8:05
10.	"Kill the Sparrow"	6:15
11.	"She Needs the Sea"	2:32
12.	"The Brightest Star in the North"	6:00
13.	"I've Come with the Butcher's Bill"	6:40
14.	"The Power of the Sea"	4:07
15.	"Treasure"	5:43
16.	"My Name Is Barbossa"	5:34
17.	"Beyond My Beloved Horizon"	2:40
18.	"He's a Pirate (Hans Zimmer vs. Dimitri Vegas & Like Mike) [Bonus Track]"	3:30
Total length:		01:11:32

== Charts ==
Chart (2017)	Peak position
Belgian Albums (Ultratop Flanders)	53
Belgian Albums (Ultratop Wallonia)	181
Spanish Albums (PROMUSICAE)	68
Swiss Albums (Schweizer Hitparade)	54

== Reception ==
The soundtrack for Dead Men Tell No Tales has received critical acclaim, with many critics noting it as a significant improvement over On Stranger Tides while also praising Zanelli's new themes and incorporation of classic music. Soundtrack Dreams states "With a spectacular, emotional sound to match the on-screen thrills, the score for Dead Men Tell No Tales is the perfect companion to the movie; it's like having all that excitement in your pocket. Geoff Zanelli takes the ingredients from previous scores and mixes it up with his own special recipe - the result is a score that has a unique identity and can introduce a whole new horde of fans to this sound and universe." Giving 3 of 5 stars, Christian Clemmensen from Filmtracks rated this score as the best of the franchise.
