= Pirates of the Caribbean: At World's End (soundtrack) =

2007 soundtrack album by Hans Zimmer

Soundtrack album by Hans Zimmer
- Released: May 22, 2007
- Studio: Todd-AO Scoring Stage in Studio City, California; Twentieth Century Fox Newman Scoring Stage in Los Angeles, California; Sony Pictures Studios Scoring Stage in Culver City, California; Abbey Road Studios in London, England; Air Lyndhurst Studios in London, England
- Genre: Film score
- Length: 55:50
- Label: Walt Disney
- Producer: Hans Zimmer

Pirates of the Caribbean chronology
Swashbuckling Sea Songs (2007)	Pirates of the Caribbean: At World's End (2007)	At World's End Remixes (2007)

Pirates of the Caribbean: At World's End is the soundtrack for the Disney movie of the same title, Pirates of the Caribbean: At World's End. It is composed and arranged by Hans Zimmer, and features additional music by Lorne Balfe, Tom Gire, Nick Glennie-Smith, Henry Jackman, Atli Örvarsson, John Sponsler, Damon M. Marvin and Geoff Zanelli.

Circuit City's initial retail shipments of the album included a free movie poster at checkout, with a minimum of ten per store. Best Buy had an exclusive ringtone code, rather than extra tracks like the previous soundtrack.

The soundtrack debuted at #14 on the US Billboard 200, selling about 35,000 copies in its first week. As of July 11, 2007, the album has sold 118,919 copies in the United States.

Professional ratings
Review scores
Source	Rating
Allmusic	2.5/5 stars
Empire	2/5 stars
Filmtracks	2/5 stars
iTunes	5/5 stars
Movie Music UK	4/5 stars
Movie Wave	4/5 stars
ScoreNotes	9/10 stars
SoundtrackNet	4.5/5 stars

== Track listing ==
#	Title	Description	Length
1.	Hoist the Colours	Hoist the Colours, "main theme" of At World's End, in addition to representing the pirates and their ideology for freedom, tells the story of how Calypso was imprisoned in a human body by the Pirate King. In its opening rendition, it is sung by a young boy and eventually by a larger chorus. A lengthy suite arrangement of the theme also makes up the end credits in the film, which is not featured on the soundtrack, but an altered version was released on the Soundtrack Treasures Collection CD on a track called Hoist the Colours Suite.	1:31
2.	Singapore	Singapore is a suite starting with Sao Feng's theme, played by varying Asian instruments, notably the erhu. The middle portion of this track is the first variation of the new Cutler Beckett and the East India Trading Company theme, used for the opening battle sequence in the Singapore bathhouse, followed by a plucked variation of Sao Feng's theme. The final minute of the cue is Jack Sparrow's easily recognizable arrival theme, actually used much later in the film when he reappears in Davy Jones' locker aboard the Black Pearl. It is presented almost identically to its appearances in the other two films.	3:40
3.	At Wit's End	At Wit's End, a lengthy suite, begins with the first appearance of the second main theme of the movie, commonly referred to as the "love theme." (Zimmer himself stated that, even though this is popularly considered a "love theme," it is in fact "a theme for the whole movie," as inspired by traditional swashbuckling scores.) Only the A and B sections of the theme are stated here, the A section on horn and the B section in a grand orchestral statement at 3:10. This is followed by a statement of Davy Jones' theme, first on music box (with Love Theme A playing over the top), then explosively on organ. The last few minutes of the cue are action material for when the ship falls off the edge of the world, again featuring the A and B sections, and ending with a new theme for the concept of "world's end".	8:05
4.	Multiple Jacks	Multiple Jacks is a synthesized and electronic piece played during Jack Sparrow's imprisonment in Davy Jones' Locker. It features an off-kilter version of Jack's theme from Dead Man's Chest, and several unique instruments such as a mouth harp.	3:51
5.	Up Is Down	Up Is Down is a fast-paced, uplifting track featuring a Celtic-inspired fiddle theme in 12/8 that accompanies statements of the A and B sections of the love theme, and ends with the world's end theme. It accompanies the scene where the Black Pearl is tipped upside-down to escape Davy Jones' Locker (though chronologically it comes after the following track, I See Dead People in Boats.)	2:42
6.	I See Dead People in Boats	I See Dead People in Boats is a suite of cues from various points in the movie. Beginning with the A love theme on solo oboe, it is most prominently featured when the Black Pearl observes the souls of the dead who are journeying to the other side and Elizabeth discovers that her father is among the travellers. The last third of this track is devoted to the action sequence later in the film when Norrington is helping Elizabeth and her Singapore crew escape from the Flying Dutchman back to The Empress, and features a short statement of the C section of the love theme.	7:09
7.	The Brethren Court	The Brethren Court starts off with another off-kilter use of the Dead Man's Chest Jack Sparrow theme (purported to represent the character of Captain Teague (Keeper Of The Code)), which is then followed by variations of the Hoist the Colours theme for the meeting of the pirate lords.	2:21
8.	Parlay	Parlay, a tribute to Ennio Morricone's Man with a Harmonica theme (from Sergio Leone's 1968 Western Once Upon a Time in the West), is used during the parlay scene. Jack, Elizabeth and Barbossa go to meet Beckett, Jones and Will, who attempts final negotiations before war. The A love theme is played by director Gore Verbinski on a distorted electric guitar, while the strings accompany with the ostinato of Cutler Beckett's theme.	2:10
9.	Calypso	Calypso heavily uses Tia Dalma's theme from Dead Man's Chest, as it accompanies the scene where she is transformed into Calypso with choral chanting.	3:02
10.	What Shall We Die For	What Shall We Die For is a powerful choral and orchestral variation of Hoist the Colours, where Elizabeth gives her war-rally speech before the final battle begins.	2:02
11.	I Don't Think Now Is the Best Time	I Don't Think Now Is the Best Time is the film's major action piece, devoted entirely to the climatic final battle between the pirates and the EITC. As Zimmer himself had confirmed, the first half of this track is actually the final part of the massive battle, during the destruction of the Endeavour — Cutler Beckett's theme is given a massive statement here as cannons tear his ship to bits. The second half serves as the middle portion of the battle, with the duel between Jack and Davy Jones for the Dead Man's Chest and the rather impromptu wedding ceremony. Many themes from all three films are interwoven here, all interconnected by a moving eight note line, including Jack Sparrow's theme, the love themes and He's a Pirate. Towards the end, the track moves to a full statement of the powerful C love theme, ending with action material from Curse of the Black Pearl.	10:45
12.	One Day	One Day is the aftermath of the battle, where the pirates have won over the East India Trading Company, and are celebrating their hard-earned victory. Jack's arrival theme is played powerfully, with an underlying eighth note rhythm, before segueing into a full statement of all three love themes, A, B and C as Elizabeth and Will share their farewell.	4:01
13.	Drink Up Me Hearties	Drink Up Me Hearties — Starting with Jack's arrival cue played on accordion, this cue details the final minutes of the film, ending with Jack's arrival cue one last time as he sails over the horizon. He's a Pirate is then played, as in the other two films, as the end credits begin to roll, before moving into another lengthy statement of all three love themes, using the Up is Down fiddle theme as an accompaniment.	4:31

== Production ==
Composer Hans Zimmer estimated that he composed "over five hours of music", because he thought that it might be "a nice idea to throw out everything and start from scratch".

== Critical reception ==
Critical response to the soundtrack differed greatly, though the album was generally well received by fans. On Amazon.com, it holds a 4.7/5 stars, the highest of any Pirates of the Caribbean score. A review by Mike Brennan on soundtrack.net, for example, praised the score as having "a level of thematic complexity that rivals most other franchises", praising its move from heavily synthetic in the Curse of the Black Pearl score to mostly orchestral, as well as its swashbuckling flavor that was missing from the first two entries. His overall rating for the score was 4.5 stars out of 5. Not all critics were impressed, however. Christian Clemmensen, on Filmtracks, though he grudgingly admitted the score was "an intelligent merging of thematic ideas from all three films" and employed a "far wider orchestral and choral palette", feels that the score still did not live up to its swashbuckling cohorts, comparing it unfavorably to John Debney's effort for Cutthroat Island. He also complained about the anthem-like statements of the love theme in One Day and Drink Up Me Hearties, saying, "... there is no style to that music. Only power". In the end, his score was two stars out of five, a rating that several visitors to the site were incensed by on the review's comments page.

== Personnel ==
- Music composed and arranged by Hans Zimmer
- Score produced by: Hans Zimmer, Bob Badami & Melissa Muik
- Executive Soundtrack Album Producers: Jerry Bruckheimer & Gore Verbinski
- Executive in Charge of Music and Soundtracks for Walt Disney Pictures and the Buena Vista Music Group: Mitchell Leib
- Music Supervisor: Bob Badami
- Executive in Charge of Music Production for the Buena Vista Motion Pictures Group: Monica Zierhut
- Music Creative/Marketing for the Buena Vista Motion Pictures Group: Glen Lajeski
- Music Business and Legal Affairs: Scott Holtzman and Sylvia Krask
- Director of Soundtracks for the Buena Vista Music Group: Desiree Craig-Ramos
- Supervising Technical Music Coordinator: Thomas Broderick
- Additional Music by: Lorne Balfe, Tom Gire, Nick Glennie-Smith, Henry Jackman, Atli Orvarsson, John Sponsler, Geoff Zanelli
- Supervising Music Editor: Melissa Muik
- Music Editors: Katie Greathouse, Barbara McDermott
- Supervising Orchestrator: Bruce Fowler
- Orchestrators: Walt Fowler, Elizabeth Finch, Ken Kugler, Suzette Moriary, Steve Bartek
- Music Preparation: Booker White
- Score Recorded by: Alan Meyerson, Slamm Andres
- Album Mixed by: Alan Meyerson, Big Al Clay
- Additional Recording by: Jeff Biggers, Big Al Clay, Greg Vines, Matt Ward
- Featured Musicians:
  - Phil Ayling — Oboe
  - Chris Bleth — Duduk
  - Pedro Eustache — Ethnic Woods
  - Karen Han — Erhu
  - Lili Haydn — Fiddle
  - Frank Marocco — Accordion
  - Heitor Pereira — Banjo
  - Simon Phillips — Drums
  - Tom Raney — Cimbalom
  - Martin Tillman — Cello
  - Gore Verbinski — Guitar
- Featured Vocalist: Delores Clay
- Principal Musicians:
  - Endre Granat — Concertmaster
  - Julie Gigante — Principal 2nd Violin
  - Brian Dembow — Viola
  - Steve Erdody — Cello
  - Nico Abondolo — Bass
  - Jim Walker, Geri Rotella — Flutes
  - Phil Ayling — Oboe
  - Jim Kanter — Clarinet
  - Michael O'Donnovan — Bassoon
  - Jim Thatcher — Horn
  - Malcolm McNab — Trumpet
  - Charlie Loper — Trombone
  - Doug Tornquist — Tuba
- Orchestra conducted by: Blake Neely, Nick Glennie-Smith
- Featured Musician Soloists co-produced by: Jimmy Levine, Nick Glennie-Smith
- Orchestra contractors: Sandy DeCrescent, Peter Rotter
- Technical Music Assistants: Pete Oso Snell, Kevin Globerman, Jacob Shea, Bobby Tahouri, Dan Zimmerman
- Digital Instrument Design by: Mark Wherry
- Production Coordinator for Hans Zimmer: Andrew Zack
- Sample Development: Claudius Bruese
- Sample Development Assistants: Zain Effendi, Mark McCormick
- Score recorded at:
  - Todd AO Scoring Stage, Studio City, California
  - Fox Scoring Stage, Century City, California
  - Sony Scoring Stage, Culver City, California
- Choir Recorded by: Geoff Foster
- Choir Contractor: Isobel Griffiths
- Choir Master: Jenny O'Grady
- Choir: Metro Voices
- Soprano: Hila Plitmann
- Choir conducted by: Matthew Dunkel
- UK Music preparation: Jill Streater
- UK Music Coordinator: Nyree Pinder
- Choir recorded at: Air Lyndhurst Studios, London and Abbey Road Studios, London
- Score mixed at: Remote Control Productions, Santa Monica, California
- Music Production Services: Steven Kofsky
- Studio Coordinator: Czarina Russell
- Music Production Intern: Seth Glennie-Smith
- Scoring stage crew: Chris Barrett, Alison Burton, Bryan Clementes, Andrew Dudman, Mark Eshelman, Dominic Gonzales, Tom Hardisty, Sam Jones, Tim Lauber, Adam Michalak, Francesco Perlangelli, Denis St. Amand, Jay Selvester, Tom Steel, Chelley Sydow
- Mastered by: Patricia Sullivan at Bernie Grundman Manstering, Hollywood CA
- Creative Direction: Steve Gerdes
- Album Design: Sean Tejaratchi
- "Hoist the Colours"
  - Cabin Boy Vocals by Brendyn Bell
  - Singing Gallows Pirates: Chris Allport, Lawrence Cummings, Jim Raycroft, Robert Hovencamp, Geoffrey Alch, Ned Werimer, Samuela Beasom, Jessica-Elisabeth
  - Lyrics by Ted Elliot and Terry Rossio
  - Music by Hans Zimmer and Gore Verbinski
