= Pirates of the Caribbean: Dead Man's Chest (soundtrack) =

Soundtrack album by Hans Zimmer
- Released: July 4, 2006
- Genre: Film score
- Length: 58:32
- Label: Walt Disney
- Producer: Hans Zimmer

Pirates of the Caribbean chronology
Pirates of the Caribbean: Tiësto Remixes (2006)	Pirates of the Caribbean: Dead Man's Chest (2006)	Swashbuckling Sea Songs (2007)

Professional ratings
Review scores
Source	Rating
AllMusic	3/5 stars
Empire	5/5 stars
Filmtracks	1/5 stars
Movie Music UK	4/5 stars
Movie Wave	2.5/5 stars
ScoreNotes	B+
Tracksounds	7/10 stars

Pirates of the Caribbean: Dead Man's Chest is the soundtrack for the Disney film of the same title, Pirates of the Caribbean: Dead Man's Chest. The score was composed and arranged by Hans Zimmer in 2006. Zimmer has noted that no electric guitars were used in the score:

Actually, it's not an electric guitar. You know what it is? It's the orchestra put through a guitar amp and piped back into the room. As soon as they finished playing, we plugged them into a guitar amp!

— Hans Zimmer at SoundtrackNet

== Response ==
The soundtrack was generally praised and contrasted with the one for the previous installment of the franchise.

== Track listing ==
No.	Title	Length
1.	"Jack Sparrow"	6:06
2.	"The Kraken"	6:55
3.	"Davy Jones"	3:15
4.	"I've Got My Eye on You"	2:25
5.	"Dinner Is Served"	1:30
6.	"Tia Dalma"	3:57
7.	"Two Hornpipes (Tortuga)"	1:14
8.	"A Family Affair"	3:34
9.	"Wheel of Fortune"	6:45
10.	"You Look Good Jack"	5:34
11.	"Hello Beastie"	10:15
12.	"He's a Pirate (Tiësto Remix)"	7:02
13.	"He's a Pirate (Pete n Red's Jolly Roger Radio Edit)*"	3:14
14.	"He's a Pirate (Chris Joss Ship Ahoy Tribal Mix)*"	4:46
15.	"He's a Pirate (Tiësto Radio Edit)**"	4:10
16.	"He's a Pirate (Tiësto Orchestral Mix)**"	7:04

* Only on the Best Buy Exclusive (Walt Disney Records 61593-7)
** Only on the second disc of the Japanese Exclusive (Avex Group AVCW 12505-6/B)

== Personnel ==
- Music Composed and Arranged by Hans Zimmer
- Score Overproduced by Hans Zimmer and Bob "Cut 'Em Up" Badami
- Executive Soundtrack Album Producers: Jerry Bruckheimer and Gore Verbinski
- Executive in Charge of Music and Soundtrack for Walt Disney Pictures and the Buena Vista Music Group: Mitchell "Swabby" Leib
- Music Supervisor: Bob "Cut 'Em Up" Badami
- Music Creative/Marketing for the Buena Vista Motion Pictures Group: Glen Lajeski
- Executive in Charge of Music Production for the Buena Vista Motion Pictures Group: Monica "Blackheart" Zierhut
- Director of Soundtracks for the Buena Vista Music Group: Desirée "Pillage" Craig-Ramos
- Additional Music by
  - Lorne "Shiver Me Timbers" Balfe
  - Tom "Chum Bucket" Gire
  - Nick "The Admiral" Glennie-Smith
  - Henry "Jolly Swordfish" Jackman
  - Trevor "Scurvy Dog" Morris
  - John "Red Beard" Sponsler
  - Geoff "Broadside" Zanelli
