= Music of the Pirates of the Caribbean film series =

The following list shows the music tracks that were featured in the Pirates of the Caribbean franchise (The Curse of the Black Pearl, Dead Man's Chest, At World's End, On Stranger Tides, Dead Men Tell No Tales) and other media created by the same team. The music was composed by George Bruns (attraction soundtrack), Klaus Badelt (film 1), Hans Zimmer (films 1-4) and Geoff Zanelli (film 5).

== Pirates of the Caribbean: Theme Park Attraction ==
=== Walt Disney's Pirates of the Caribbean ===
Walt Disney's Pirates Of The Caribbean

Soundtrack album by George Bruns
- Released: 1966
- Label: Disneyland Records

1. "A Pirate's Journey"
2. "Down with the Ship"
3. "Cursed Treasure and Hearts"
4. "Davy Jones' Locker"
5. "Asleep in the Dirt"
6. "The Captain's Deck"
7. "Yo Ho (A Pirate's Life for Me)"

== Pirates of the Caribbean: The Curse of the Black Pearl ==
Pirates of the Caribbean: The Curse of the Black Pearl soundtrack, score, recording sessions, remixes are official release soundtrack albums from the film with the same title. The album was released in 2003, by Walt Disney Records and contains selections of music from the movie's score and some albums even never featured music. The music of the film and this album are both credited to composers and producers Klaus Badelt and Hans Zimmer.

=== Motion Picture Soundtrack ===
The Curse of the Black Pearl (Soundtrack)

Soundtrack album by Klaus Badelt and Hans Zimmer
- Released: July 22, 2003
- Recorded: 2003
- Genre: Orchestral
- Length: 43:38
- Label: Walt Disney
- Producer: Klaus Badelt; Hans Zimmer

All tracks are written by Klaus Badelt and Hans Zimmer

No.	Title	Length
1.	"Fog Bound"	2:16
2.	"The Medallion Calls"	1:52
3.	"The Black Pearl"	2:16
4.	"Will And Elizabeth"	2:08
5.	"Swords Crossed"	3:15
6.	"Walk The Plank"	1:58
7.	"Barbossa Is Hungry"	4:06
8.	"Blood Ritual"	3:32
9.	"Moonlight Serenade"	2:08
10.	"To The Pirates' Cave!"	3:30
11.	"Skull And Crossbones"	3:24
12.	"Bootstrap's Bootstraps"	2:38
13.	"Underwater March"	4:12
14.	"One Last Shot"	4:46
15.	"He's a Pirate"	1:30
Total length:		43:38

=== Remix Album ===
Pirates Remixed

Soundtrack album by Tiësto
- Released: June 20, 2006
- Recorded: 2006
- Genre: Remix EP
- Length: 47:50
- Label: Walt Disney
- Producer: Tiësto; Klaus Badelt; Hans Zimmer

All tracks are written by Tiësto, Klaus Badelt, Hans Zimmer and various DJs

No.	Title	Length
1.	"He's A Pirate - Tiësto Radio Edit"	4:05
2.	"He's A Pirate - Pete N' Red's Jolly Roger Radio Edit"	3:11
3.	"Swords Crossed - Original Score"	3:17
4.	"He's A Pirate - Friscia & Lamboy Tribal Treasure Mix"	8:17
5.	"He's A Pirate - Pelo Verde Mix"	5:14
6.	"He's A Pirate - Tiësto Remix"	7:03
7.	"He's A Pirate - Pete N' Red's Jolly Roger Trance Mix"	5:43
8.	"He's A Pirate - Chris Joss Ship Ahoy Tribal Mix"	4:43
9.	"Jack Theme Suite - New Score Cue From Pirates Of The Caribbean: Dead Man's Chest"	6:11
Total length:		47:50

== Pirates of the Caribbean: Dead Man's Chest ==
Pirates of the Caribbean: Dead Man's Chest soundtrack, score, recording sessions, remixes are official release soundtrack albums from the film with the same title. The album was released in 2006, by Walt Disney Records and contains selections of music from the movie's score and some albums even never featured music. The music of the film and this album are both credited to composer and producer Hans Zimmer.

=== Motion Picture Soundtrack ===
Dead Man's Chest (Soundtrack)

Soundtrack album by Hans Zimmer
- Released: July 4, 2006
- Recorded: 2006
- Genre: Orchestral
- Length: 1:06:32
- Label: Walt Disney
- Producer: Hans Zimmer; Tiësto

All tracks are written by Hans Zimmer, Tiësto and various DJs

No.	Title	Length
1.	"Jack Sparrow"	6:05
2.	"The Kraken"	6:54
3.	"Davy Jones"	3:15
4.	"I've Got My Eye On You"	2:25
5.	"Dinner Is Served"	1:30
6.	"Tia Dalma"	3:57
7.	"Two Hornpipes (Tortuga)"	1:14
8.	"A Family Affair"	3:34
9.	"Wheel Of Fortune"	6:45
10.	"You Look Good Jack"	5:34
11.	"Hello Beastie"	10:13
12.	"He's A Pirate - Tiësto Remix"	7:02
13.	"He's A Pirate - Pete N' Red's Jolly Roger Radio Edit"	3:13
14.	"He's A Pirate - Chris Joss Ship Ahoy Tribal Mix"	4:46
Total length:		1:06:32

=== Remix Album ===
Dead Man's Chest Remixes

Soundtrack album by Tiësto
- Released: June 23, 2006
- Recorded: 2006
- Genre: Remix EP
- Length: 24:25
- Label: Walt Disney
- Producer: Tiësto; Hans Zimmer; Klaus Badelt

All tracks are written by Tiësto, Hans Zimmer, Klaus Badelt and various DJs

No.	Title	Length
1.	"He's A Pirate - Tiësto Radio Edit"	4:05
2.	"He's A Pirate - Tiësto Remix"	7:03
3.	"He's A Pirate - Tiësto Orchestral Remix"	7:03
4.	"Jack Theme Suite - New Score Cue From Pirates Of The Caribbean: Dead Man's Chest"	6:11
Total length:		24:25

== Pirates of the Caribbean: At World's End ==
Pirates of the Caribbean: At World's End soundtrack, score, recording sessions, remixes are official release soundtrack albums from the film with the same title. The album was released in 2007, by Walt Disney Records and contains selections of music from the movie's score and some albums even never featured music. The music of the film and this album are both credited to composer and producer Hans Zimmer.

=== Motion Picture Soundtrack ===
At World's End (Soundtrack)

Soundtrack album by Hans Zimmer
- Released: May 22, 2007
- Recorded: 2007
- Genre: Orchestral
- Length: 55:58
- Label: Walt Disney
- Producer: Hans Zimmer

All tracks are written by Hans Zimmer

No.	Title	Length
1.	"Hoist The Colours"	1:31
2.	"Singapore"	3:40
3.	"At Wit's End"	8:05
4.	"Multiple Jacks"	3:51
5.	"Up Is Down"	2:42
6.	"I See Dead People In Boats"	7:09
7.	"The Brethren Court"	2:21
8.	"Parlay"	2:10
9.	"Calypso"	3:02
10.	"What Shall We Die For"	2:02
11.	"I Don't Think Now Is The Best Time"	10:45
12.	"One Day"	4:01
13.	"Drink Up Me Hearties"	4:31
Total length:		55:58

=== Remix Album ===
At World's End Remixes

Soundtrack album by Paul Oakenfold
- Released: May 22, 2007
- Recorded: 2007
- Genre: Remix EP
- Length: 25:57
- Label: Walt Disney
- Producer: Paul Oakenfold; Hans Zimmer

All tracks are written by Paul Oakenfold, Hans Zimmer and various DJs

No.	Title	Length
1.	"Jack's Suite - Paul Oakenfold Mix"	6:49
2.	"Jack's Suite - Paul Oakenfold Mix Radio Edit"	3:36
3.	"Jack's Suite - The Crystal Method Mix"	6:01
4.	"Jack's Suite - The Crystal Method Mix Radio Edit"	3:45
5.	"Pirates Live Forever - Ryeland Allison Remix"	5:43
Total length:		25:57

=== Unreleased Album ===
Remixed and Unreleased

Soundtrack album by Hans Zimmer
- Released: December 4, 2007
- Recorded: 2007
- Genre: Orchestral
- Length: 1:18:12
- Label: Walt Disney
- Producer: Hans Zimmer

All tracks are written by Hans Zimmer and various DJs

No.	Title	Length
1.	"Pirates, Day One, 4:56AM - Original Hans Zimmer Theme, The Curse Of The Black Pearl"	3:46
2.	"Marry Me - Score Suite From At World's End"	11:37
3.	"The Heart Of Davy Jones - Score Suite From Dead Man's Chest"	3:14
4.	"Lord Cutler Beckett - Theme From Dead Man's Chest, Score Suite From At World's End"	8:47
5.	"Jack's Theme Bare Bones Demo - Hans Zimmer Piano Demo From Dead Man's Chest"	4:05
6.	"Hoist The Colours Suite - Score Suite From At World's End"	5:43
7.	"The Pirate Lord Of Singapore - Score Suite From At World's End"	5:58
8.	"Just Good Business - Score Suite From At World's End"	5:56
9.	"He's A Pirate - Pete N' Red's Jolly Roger Radio Edit"	3:13
10.	"He's A Pirate - Friscia & Lamboy Tribal Treasure Mix"	4:38
11.	"He's A Pirate - Pelo Verde Mix"	4:40
12.	"He's A Pirate - Chris Joss Ship Ahoy Tribal Mix"	4:05
13.	"He's A Pirate - Remo-Con Remix"	6:55
14.	"Singapore - Remo-Con Far East Island Remix"	5:28
Total length:		1:18:12

== Pirates of the Caribbean: On Stranger Tides ==
Pirates of the Caribbean: On Stranger Tides soundtrack, score, recording sessions, remixes are official release soundtrack albums from the film with the same title. The album was released in 2011, by Walt Disney Records and contains selections of music from the movie's score and some albums even never featured music. The music of the film and this album are both credited to composer Hans Zimmer and Rodrigo y Gabriela and producer Hans Zimmer.

=== Motion Picture Soundtrack ===
On Stranger Tides (Soundtrack)

Soundtrack album by Hans Zimmer
- Released: May 17, 2011
- Recorded: 2011
- Genre: Orchestral
- Length: 1:17:47
- Label: Walt Disney
- Producer: Hans Zimmer

All tracks are written by Hans Zimmer, Rodrigo y Gabriela and various DJs

No.	Title	Length
1.	"Guilty Of Being Innocent Of Being Jack Sparrow"	1:42
2.	"Angelica"	4:17
3.	"Mutiny"	2:48
4.	"The Pirate That Should Not Be"	3:55
5.	"Mermaids"	8:05
6.	"South Of Heaven's Chanting Mermaids"	5:48
7.	"Palm Tree Escape"	3:06
8.	"Blackbeard"	5:05
9.	"Angry And Dead Again"	5:33
10.	"On Stranger Tides"	2:44
11.	"End Credits"	2:00
12.	"Guilty Of Being Innocent Of Being Jack Sparrow - Remixed By DJ Earthworm"	2:45
13.	"Angelica (Grant Us Peace Remix) - Remixed By Ki:Theory"	3:08
14.	"The Pirate That Should Not Be - Remixed By Photek"	6:26
15.	"Blackbeard - Remixed By Super Mash Bros & Thieves"	5:27
16.	"South Of Heaven's Chanting Mermaids - Remixed By Paper Diamond"	3:32
17.	"Palm Tree Escape - Remixed By Adam Freeland"	5:28
18.	"Angry And Dead Again - Remixed By Static Revenger"	5:49
Total length:		1:17:47

== Pirates of the Caribbean: Dead Men Tell No Tales ==
=== Motion Picture Soundtrack ===
Dead Men Tell No Tales (Soundtrack)

Soundtrack album by Geoff Zanelli
- Released: May 26, 2017
- Recorded: 2017
- Genre: Orchestral
- Length: 1:11:32
- Label: Walt Disney
- Producer: Geoff Zanelli

All tracks are written by Geoff Zanelli, plus a bonus song by Dimitri Vegas & Like Mike. Zanelli draws heavily from the past work by Klaus Badelt and Hans Zimmer to connect the franchise, while also incorporating many of his own new themes and leitmotifs for the new characters.

No.	Title	Length
1.	"Dead Men Tell No Tales"	1:51
2.	"Salazar"	4:27
3.	"No Woman Has Ever Handled My Herschel"	3:59
4.	"You Speak of the Trident"	1:57
5.	"The Devil's Triangle"	2:45
6.	"Shansa"	3:12
7.	"Kill the Filthy Pirate, I'll Wait"	4:50
8.	"The Dying Gull"	1:01
9.	"El Matador Del Mar"	8:05
10.	"Kill the Sparrow"	6:16
11.	"She Needs the Sea"	2:32
12.	"The Brightest Star in the North"	6:00
13.	"I've Come With the Butcher's Bill"	6:41
14.	"The Power of the Sea"	4:07
15.	"Treasure"	5:43
16.	"My Name is Barbossa"	5:34
17.	"Beyond My Beloved Horizon"	2:41
18.	"He's a Pirate (Hans Zimmer vs Dimitri Vegas & Like Mike) [Bonus Track]"	3:31
Total length:		1:11:32
