= The Legends of Treasure Island =

- US DVD cover
- Genre: Animated series
- Based on: Treasure Island by Robert Louis Stevenson
- Directed by: Dino Athanassiou; Simon Ward-Horner
- Starring: Dawn French; John Hasler; Juliet Stevenson; Corinna Powlesland; Richard E. Grant; Rob Brydon; Robert Powell; Hugh Laurie; Chris Barrie; Rob Rackstraw; Gary Martin; Carla Mendonça; Issy Van Randwyck; William Maxwell; David Holt; Leslie Randall; Shona Morris; Jimmy Hibbert
- Country of origin: United Kingdom
- Original language: English
- No. of seasons: 2
- No. of episodes: 26

Production
- Producer: Peter Lewis
- Editor: Andi Sloss
- Running time: 22–25 minutes
- Production companies: FilmFair; Central Independent Television; Carlton UK Productions

Original release
- Network: ITV (CITV)
- Release: 10 September 1993 – 27 June 1995

The Legends of Treasure Island is a British animated television series. It had two series of 13 episodes each and each episode runs for 22–25 minutes.

The series was loosely based on Robert Louis Stevenson's original 1883 novel Treasure Island. Featuring a mysterious and dark storyline, it incorporates magic and many new characters. Billy Bones is not depicted in this series, as he is replaced by Jim's father, Mr. Hawkins.

The series was broadcast in the United Kingdom and in other countries throughout Europe, Iberian Peninsula and Asia and was also aired in Australia on ABC TV Network. The programme was a FilmFair production for Central Independent Television. As of 2021, The Legends of Treasure Island is owned by ITV plc.

== Characters ==
This cartoon, unlike most other Treasure Island cartoons and films, featured the main characters as anthropomorphic animals:

- Jim Hawkins: The main protagonist, he is cunning for his age, and determined to reach the treasure as his father asked him.
- Ben Gunn: A hermit found living on the Island, he knows more about the dangers of the Island and is able to provide warnings. He frequently describes things as being "like a leech" and often speaks in very vague terms that can be hard to understand.
- Long John Silver: Unlike the book and most adaptations, Long John Silver is not an anti-hero with dubious morality but rather a straight villain, although he does save Jim's life in episode 3.
- Dr. Livesey: A friend of Jim and his father, he aids the boy against the pirates.
- Captain Smollett: A brave captain who offers Jim his aid. When Jim states that he cannot pay Smollett, he states that he will accept a new pair of boots after they find the treasure as payment. He is also the one who decides to go to Squire Trelawney for funding, as the two are close friends.
- Squire Trelawney: Squire Trelawney is a friendly, yet money-obsessed character, who is only convinced to fund the expedition upon hearing the promise of treasure. He often acts as if he does not have a clue what he is doing, despite supposedly having gone on many adventures.
- Blind Pew: The mysterious blind boss of Long John Silver.
- Jane: One of the exclusive characters for this incarnation, Jane was kidnapped by Silver to be held for ransom, but since her parents did not want her, he got stuck with her. In the first episode, she switches sides and teams up with Jim, for whom she showed growing feelings as the series progressed.

Subsidiary recurring characters included the pirates Morgan (a hog), Nebbich (a hyena), and Rat (who was, appropriately enough, a rat). These characters featured mainly in the first season and only made minor appearances at the beginning of the second before disappearing altogether. Other minor pirates except Israel Hands seen during series 1 included a weasel and a rabbit among others.

== Cast ==
=== Series 1 ===
- Dawn French as Jim Hawkins
- Juliet Stevenson as Jane
- Richard E. Grant as Long John Silver
- Robert Powell as Dr. Livesey
- Hugh Laurie as Squire Trelawney
- Chris Barrie as Captain Smollett / Ben Gunn
- Rob Rackstraw as Pew [uncredited]
- Jimmy Hibbert as Nebbich / Rat / Weasel [uncredited]
- Gary Martin as Merman Prince in ep 12, Additional Voices
- Carla Mendonça as Additional Voices

=== Series 2 ===
- John Hasler as Jim Hawkins
- Hugh Laurie as Squire Trelawney
- Chris Barrie as Captain Smollett / Ben Gunn
- Rob Brydon as Long John Silver
- Corinna Powlesland as Jane
- Rob Rackstraw as Pew [uncredited]
- Carla Mendonça as Sea Witch / Small Mole [uncredited]
- William Maxwell as Dave
- David Holt as Boil
- Leslie Randall
- Shona Morris as Mad Meg
- Issy Van Randwyck as Mother of small mole
- Jimmy Hibbert as Nebbich / Rat / Weasel [uncredited]

== Episodes ==
=== Series overview ===
Series	Episodes	Originally released	
Series	Episodes	First released	Last released
1	13	10 September 1993	3 December 1993
2	13	4 April 1995	27 June 1995

=== Season 1 (1993) ===
No. overall	No. in season	Title	Original release date
1	1	"The Quest Begins"	10 September 1993
Jim leaves the Admiral Benbow with Captain Flint's treasure map and begins a treasure voyage aboard Captain Smollett's ship. Along the way Silver and his gang board and take over the ship, but Jim and his friends escape and enter a portal to Treasure Island.
2	2	"Memories Are Made of This"	17 September 1993
Setting up camp on the island, the explorers venture into a purple mist which temporarily gives them amnesia, resulting in them handing the map over to the pirates. Captain Smollett and shipwrecked dog Ben Gunn go to rescue them.
3	3	"The Watch Tower"	24 September 1993
Jim and Jane explore a watchtower on Skeleton Island but end up leaving the map there and must go back to retrieve it. The pirates learn of this and plan to get the map before they do.
4	4	"Now You See Me"	1 October 1993
Jim and Jane discover a cemetery with Flint's grave where the treasure may be buried. Meanwhile, Jane puts on a ring that makes her invisible and cannot take it off.
5	5	"Return to Sender"	8 October 1993
Ben Gunn wants to borrow Long John Silver's longboat to reach his friend on Yonder Island, but the pirate will only lend it to him in exchange for the map.
6	6	"Flint's Return"	15 October 1993
Once every year, the ghost of Captain Flint rises from his grave to visit the spot where he buried his treasure. While the pirates plan to use this to find the treasure, the explorers plan to use it to trap the pirates.
7	7	"The Labyrinth"	22 October 1993
Pew plans to use the Labyrinth, a mountain cave, to get rid of Jim and his friends once and for all. Silver also plans to not only do this, but also get rid of Pew, tired of his command.
8	8	"The Pool of Prophecy"	29 October 1993
Jim falls into the Pool of Prophecy, which shows him a vision of the future where he will become a pirate.
9	9	"The Fountain of Truth"	5 November 1993
Long John Silver drinks from the Fountain of Truth, believing it to be the Fountain of Youth. As a result, he begins to speak to the truth and plans to change his ways.
10	10	"Tails We Win"	12 November 1993
Jane wonders off and discovers a lagoon where she befriends a mermaid. While she is gone, Silver attacks the campsite, taking Jim and his friends prisoner. Jane and her mermaid friend have save them from Silver.
11	11	"The Cave of Babel"	19 November 1993
While exploring the island one day, Jim comes across a mysterious cave and is hypnotized into entering a giant crystal. Transported inside, Jim is disfigured by the crystal's magic, coming out as a flat picasso-like figurine. Meanwhile, John and his assistant Rat also enter the cave where their heads are swapped by the magic. They soon clash with Jim and his friends over the map and soon face off in the cave where their fighting causes the cave's destruction, reverting them to normal.
12	12	"The Merman Prince"	26 November 1993
Long John Silver makes a deal with a merman prince to give Jane over as a bride to the merman in exchange for a magic compass.
13	13	"The Beginning of the End"	3 December 1993
Long John Silver accidentally destroys a statue of a fire god resulting in the island about to self-destruct, unable to cope with any more evil. While the explorers make a deal with the pirates, Jim and Silver have a fiery showdown atop the island volcano.

=== Season 2 (1995) ===
No. overall	No. in season	Title	Original release date
14	1	"Consequence"	4 April 1995
Jim and Ben Gunn (along with Squire Trelawney) return to the island planning to save it from self-destructing but the place has other ideas. Meanwhile, Pew is about to rise from his watery grave, endangering Jim and his friends.
15	2	"Reunion"	11 April 1995
Jane leaves Captain Smollett and Dr. Livesey on the Hispaniola to join Jim and the others on the island. She stumbles across a shipwreck containing Flint's logbook that could lead them to the treasure, but she is menaced by a ghost.
16	3	"Silver in the Island's Underworld"	18 April 1995
Following his fall into the volcano at the end of Series 1, Long John Silver finds himself in Hell where he meets some horrific creatures including the Devil himself.
17	4	"Silver's Bond"	25 April 1995
Back in the land of living, as part of a pact to send Jim to the underworld in his place, Long John Silver attempts to convince the boy that he has changed but Jim is not so sure.
18	5	"Emily"	2 May 1995
Jim and Jane stumble across a shipwreck graveyard where they meet a ghost girl called Emily who is looking for her father.
19	6	"Forest of Darkness"	9 May 1995
The squire gets taken by a tribe who believes he is a god called the Great Kaloombah, but as he and his friends learn, the tribe plan to sacrifice him to the volcano.
20	7	"Antidote"	16 May 1995
Jane is bitten by a snake and has only 24 hours to live. Jim and Ben Gunn must venture across a dangerous swamp to find the antidote.
21	8	"City in the Sky"	23 May 1995
Believing himself to have died, Squire Trelawney is taken to the mysterious city in the sky for the good deed of rescuing the treasure they had by a group of humanoids with wings. As he stays up there, he falls in love with the caretaker, but Silver and his minions invade the land to plan to take the egg-shaped treasures.
22	9	"Dragon"	30 May 1995
Jim and Long John must put aside their differences when they are both swallowed by a dragon and must find their way out of the beast.
23	10	"Allegiance"	6 June 1995
A group of sailors discover what appear to be the lost treasure of Captain Flint, forcing Ben and Trelawney to disguise themselves as the sailors. While Trelawney wins over part of the crew with his alleged stories, Long John Silver takes over the ship.
24	11	"The Oracle"	13 June 1995
Lured into an underwater city by a mysterious witch who plans to feed them to the Kraken, the explorers and Silver must find a way to escape, with the former trying to save the true ruler of the underwater city.
25	12	"Double Cross"	20 June 1995
The explorers are captured by Long John Silver and Pew who make them find the treasure and try to dispose of each other in the process.
26	13	"One For All"	27 June 1995
Captain Smollett and Dr. Livesey return and rescue Jim from Pew. With the treasure, the explorers plan to head home but they are not out of the woods yet.

The order commonly listed (Flint's Return as ep. 5, The Cave of Babel as ep. 6, City in the Sky as ep. 20, Antidote as ep. 21 etc.) is taken from the Australian VHS releases and is possibly a production order.

== Broadcast ==
- (United Kingdom) U.K.
  - ITV (CITV, 1993–1995)
  - Carlton Kids (1998–1999)
- Spain
  - TVE 1
  - TVE 2
- Australia
  - ABC TV (1995–1996, 1999–2000)
  - 7two (2010)
- (Republic of Ireland) Ireland
  - RTÉ 1 (1996)
  - Network 2 (The Den, 1995–1996)
- (United Arab Emirates) U.A.E.
  - Dubai 33
- South Africa
  - SABC 2 (1998–1999)
- Namibia
  - NBC (1994–????)
- Poland
  - TVP2 (1995–1996, 1998)
- Italy
  - Rete 4 (1996–1997)
- France
  - Canal+ (1993)
  - Canaille Peluche (1993)
  - FR3 (1994–1995)
  - Les Minikeums (1994–1995)
  - The Disney Channel (1999)
- Singapore
  - Channel 5 (Take 5, 1993–1996)
- Malaysia
  - MetroVision (1995)
- Jordan
  - Channel 2
- Germany
  - BFBS (Children's SSVC)
  - SSVC Television (Children's SSVC)
- Russia
  - Channel One Russia (1995–1996)
- Pakistan
  - PTV
- Brunei
  - RTB
- Thailand
  - IBC 7
- New Zealand
  - TV2
- Kuwait
  - KTV2
- Indonesia
  - ANTV

== Trivia & home media releases ==
- The episode Reunion in series 2 was aired out of order, probably due to the episode being produced following the first episode. It was aired and released on home video in Australia as the second episode of series 2, while chronologically it is the fourth episode.
- When The Legends of Treasure Island got its solo video release in the UK from Pickwick Video, it had 3 episodes; it omits the second episode Memories Are Made of This, but it does contain the first, third and fourth episode from series 1.
- Although it was a UK show, the entire series was not made available on video there. The entire 26 episodes however were released on video in Australia by Reel Entertainment, with 12 volumes released.
- A TV movie version featuring select episodes from series 1 of the show was released on video and DVD in the US by Image Entertainment. Both releases are now out of print.
