= Dr. Livesey =

Character from Stevenson's Treasure Island

Dr. David Livesey
- Treasure Island character
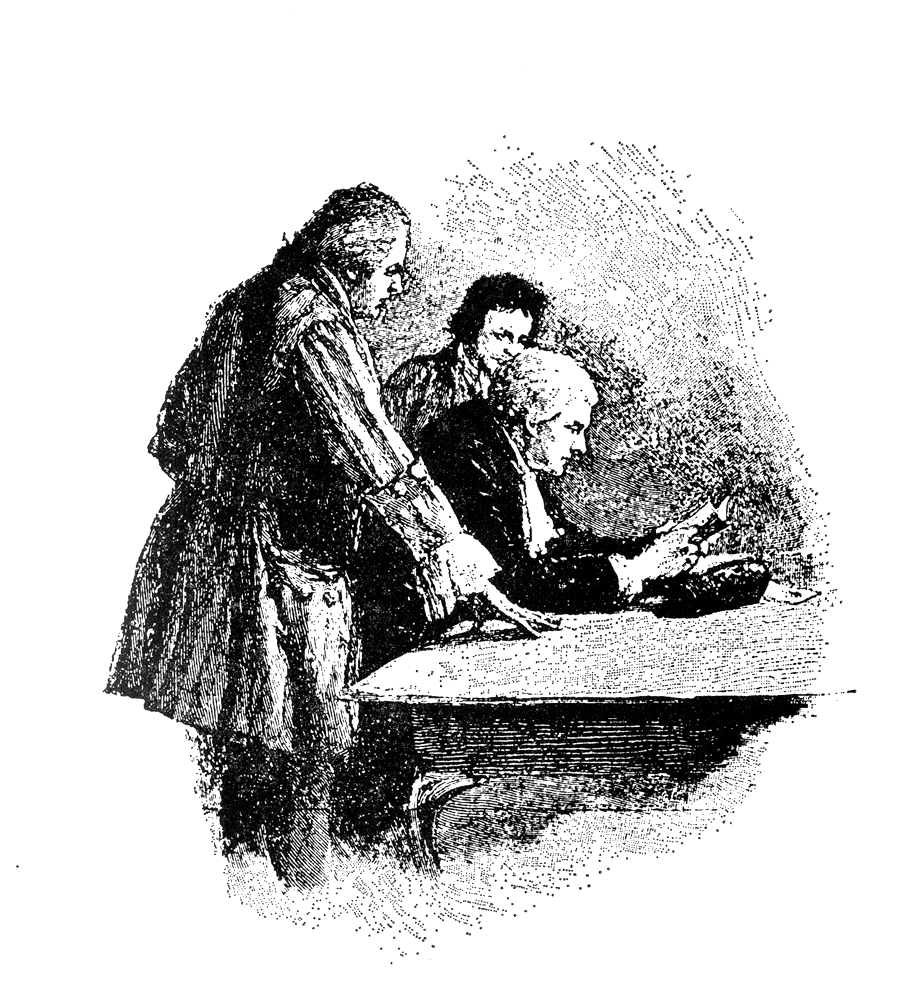
- Livesey and Squire Trelawney in a 1889 illustration by George Rowe
- Created by: Robert Louis Stevenson

In-universe information
- Species: Human
- Gender: Male
- Occupation: Doctor and magistrate
- Affiliation: British Army (prior to book)
- Nationality: English

Dr. David Livesey (/ˈlɪvsi/) is a fictional character from the 1883 novel Treasure Island by Robert Louis Stevenson. As well as doctor, he is a magistrate, an important man in the rural society of southwest England, where the story opens; his social position is marked by his wearing a white wig—even in the harsh conditions of the island on which the adventure takes place.

Some years previously, he had fought in the Battle of Fontenoy (1745), and was wounded in action during the battle.

The doctor first appears in the book when he comes to the "Admiral Benbow" to care for Jim Hawkins' ailing father, demonstrating courage and strength of character as he resists the attempts of pirate Billy Bones to bully him. On Bones' subsequent death and the discovery of the treasure map, Dr. Livesey throws in his lot with Squire Trelawney's plans to recover Captain J. Flint's famous hoard. The more sensible of the two, Dr. Livesey suggests discretion in recruiting a crew for the expedition, urging Trelawney to keep the purpose of the Hispaniola's voyage secret in case they get found out by pirate spies.

When Hawkins (now serving as cabin boy) discovers the pirates' plot, it is the doctor he seeks out to make his report. Livesey keeps his head in the crisis and lets none of the crew see that he has just been given dreadful news. Thanks to his cool temperament, he, Captain Alexander Smollett, and the squire are able to plan their escape with the few men they can trust. The doctor himself narrates their subsequent flight from the ship and the establishing of their camp in the old stockade on the island.

Later, when ship's cook Long John Silver and the crew attack, the doctor—a battle-hardened veteran—fights well and, with Captain Smollett wounded, takes responsibility for the safety of the expedition. Acting on Jim's account of his earlier adventures, he sets out to find Ben Gunn and succeeds in winning the castaway's loyalty with the offer of a small Parmesan cheese, a foodstuff for which Gunn has been pining through three years of living on goat meat. He negotiates a truce with Silver by agreeing to surrender the treasure map, which he (but not Silver) now knows to be useless. During the subsequent battle at the site of the plundered cache, he arrives opportunely to orchestrate the rescue of Jim and, as it turns out, Silver.

Dr. Livesey, though at one point earning a merited rebuke from Captain Smollett for inattention to his post, likely has the largest share of the credit for the expedition's success. He can very well be considered the hero of the story. Without him, the whole expedition would have been a disaster.

Devoted to his Hippocratic Oath, Dr. Livesey feels duty-bound to treat wounded and ill pirates, even though they are enemies who tried to kill him and might try again.

Stevenson does not describe Dr. Livesey; he lets the doctor describe himself by his actions. He is intelligent, brave, and has cool-headed qualities that win the day against the cunning and ruthlessness of his formidable adversary Silver.

== Portrayals ==
- Charles Hill Mailes in the 1920 version.
- Otto Kruger in the 1934 version.
- Denis O'Dea in the 1950 Disney live-action version.
- Laimonas Noreika in the 1971 live-action version.
- Ángel del Pozo in the 1972 version.
- Anthony Bate in the 1977 version.
- Iemasa Kayumi in the 1978 anime.
- Victor Kostetskiy in the 1982 version.
- David Warbeck in the 1987 Treasure Island in Outer Space.
- Evgeniy Papernyy in the 1988 Soviet version. This depiction of Dr. Livesey later became an internet meme in 2022.
- Julian Glover in the 1990 version.
- In Disney's 1996 Muppet Treasure Island, he is portrayed by Dr. Bunsen Honeydew, who in turn is performed by Dave Goelz.
- David Robb in the 1999 version.
- In the 2002 Disney animated film Treasure Planet, he is replaced with Dr. Delbert Doppler, a dog-like alien voiced by David Hyde Pierce. He is a composite character borrowing elements from Dr. Livesey and Squire Trelawney.
- Jeff Denton in the 2006 film Pirates of Treasure Island.
- Daniel Mays in the 2012 version.
