= Captain Alexander Smollett =

Fictional character in the 1883 novel Treasure Island

- Treasure Island character
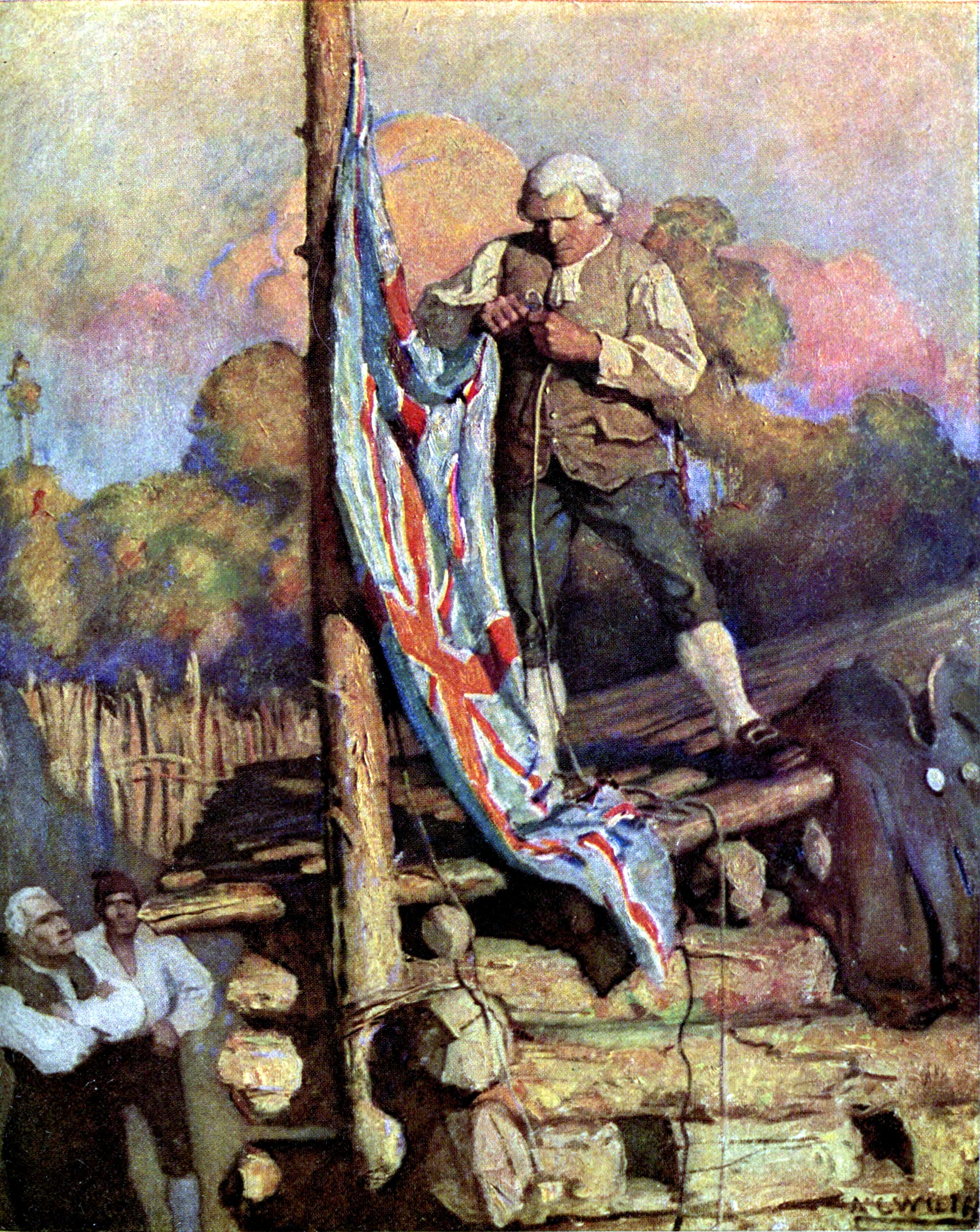
- Captain Smollet Defies the Mutineers illustration by N. C. Wyeth for 1911 edition.
- Created by: Robert Louis Stevenson

In-universe information
- Species: Human
- Gender: Male
- Title: Captain
- Occupation: Sea captain
- Nationality: English

Captain Alexander Smollett is the fictional captain of the schooner Hispaniola in Robert Louis Stevenson's 1883 novel Treasure Island. He plays an important part in disciplining the main characters on the ship as the story progresses, and helps the protagonists survive against the pirates later on.

== In the novel ==
He first appears to the reader as a strict, bitter man who finds fault with everything and is never satisfied. However, he quickly reveals that not all is well aboard the ship, and his first conversation with Jim Hawkins, Dr. Livesey, and Squire Trelawney foreshadows the eventual mutiny of many of the Hispaniola's members under the leadership of Long John Silver, a cunning and wealthy one-legged pirate. When the Hispaniola finally reaches its destination and the pirates rebel, he organizes the faithful crew's flight from the Hispaniola onto the shores of the island and helps in gaining a stockade. The next day, he attempts to negotiate with "Captain" Long John Silver, but the negotiations fail due to the arrogance of Silver and the stubbornness of Smollett. (Indeed, Smollett admits that he has goaded Silver on purpose, reasoning that battle is probably inevitable and might as well be fought sooner rather than later, while they are alert and fresh.) As a result, Silver storms off in a rage, and Smollett is left to organize the defence of the stockade. In the battle of the stockade, he is seriously wounded by two bullets, though neither incapacitates him, and he disappears from the story for the most part. In the end, he and the faithful crew sail back to Bristol laden with treasure, and he retires from seafaring.

Captain Smollett's role in the story is crucial, but he is usually remembered for his temperamental personality. He is obsessed with duty and expects all his orders to be followed to the letter. When the stockade's defences break down during his negotiations with Silver, he explodes, venting his rage on the Doctor and Squire Trelawney for abandoning their stations to watch the negotiations. Yet, he doesn't fail to reward those who perform well and praises Abraham Gray, a mutineer who defects to their side, for staying at his post dutifully.

== Film adaptations ==
- Buddy Messinger in the 1918 version.
- Harry Holden in the 1920 version.
- Lewis Stone in the 1934 version.
- Basil Sydney in the 1950 Disney live-action version.
- Rik Battaglia in the 1972 live-action version.
- Richard Beale in the 1977 version.
- Konstantin Grigoriev in the 1982 version.
- Klaus Löwitsch in the 1987 outer space version.
- Viktor Andriyenko in the 1988 Soviet version.
- Clive Wood in the 1990 version.
- In the 1996 Disney Muppets version, the character was renamed Captain Abraham Smollett (Kermit the Frog as performed by Steve Whitmire) by Brian Henson and the scriptwriters. Here, the character has a much larger role and is more benevolent, suiting his portrayer, as well as being the former fiancé of Benjamina Gunn (Miss Piggy).
- Malcolm Stoddard in the 1999 version.
- In the 2002 Disney film Treasure Planet, the character is replaced with Captain Amelia, a female cat-like alien. She is voiced by Emma Thompson.
- In the 2006 film Pirates of Treasure Island by The Asylum, the character is depicted as a Frenchman trading with the then-new United States.
- Philip Glenister in 2012 version.
