= Treasure Island (2012 TV series) =

British TV series

- UK DVD Cover
- Based on: Treasure Island by Robert Louis Stevenson
- Screenplay by: Stewart Harcourt
- Directed by: Steve Barron
- Starring: Eddie Izzard; Toby Regbo; Rupert Penry-Jones; Daniel Mays; Philip Glenister; Donald Sutherland; Elijah Wood; Shirley Henderson
- Theme music composer: Antony Genn; Martin Slattery
- Countries of origin: United Kingdom; Ireland
- Original language: English

Production
- Producers: Alan Moloney; Laurie Borg
- Cinematography: Ulf Brantås
- Editor: Alex Mackie
- Running time: 180 minutes
- Production companies: Kindle Entertainment; MNG Films; Parallel Film Productions

Original release
- Network: Sky1
- Release: 1 January – 2 January 2012

Treasure Island is a two-part British television drama adaptation of the novel Treasure Island (1883) by Robert Louis Stevenson. The screenplay was written by Stewart Harcourt, produced by Laurie Borg and directed by Steve Barron. It was made by BSkyB and first shown in the United Kingdom on Sky1 on 1 & 2 January 2012. It was re-released a year later on Pick on the 14 February 2013 and 21 February 2013.

== Plot ==
Young Jim Hawkins (Toby Regbo) discovers a map to a legendary island of treasure belonging to the infamous Captain Flint (Donald Sutherland) and embarks on a journey aboard the ship Hispaniola to find it; however, the enigmatic Long John Silver (Eddie Izzard) and crew have other plans.

== Cast ==
- Eddie Izzard as Long John Silver, formerly Captain Flint's quartermaster and latterly landlord of the Spyglass Inn, cook on the Hispaniola, and leader of the mutineers. In this adaptation he loses his leg after Flint fires a cannon at his crew to get them off the ship.
- Philip Glenister as Captain Smollett, captain of the Hispaniola
- Rupert Penry-Jones as Squire John Trelawney, the leader of the expedition, a greedy, stupid man who betrays his comrades. Rather different from his portrayal in the book, in which he is something of a buffoon but is described as "the most liberal of men".
- Toby Regbo as Jim Hawkins, son of the proprietors of the Admiral Benbow inn and the Hispaniola's cabin boy
- Daniel Mays as Dr. David Livesey, the ship's doctor, an old friend of Jim's parents. A former army surgeon who fought at Fontenoy, in the book he is always sensible and brave, but in this adaptation is initially something of a coward (though he later proves to be quite brave).
- Reda Kateb as Dujon, the second mate of the Hispaniola. Dujon was invented for this adaptation.
- Donald Sutherland as Captain Flint, a legendary pirate. Flint does not appear in the book, but is only spoken of. In this adaptation he appears in a prologue.
- Elijah Wood as Ben Gunn, a former member of Flint's crew marooned on Treasure Island three years before after he persuaded his crewmates on another ship to search for the treasure. When they could not find it, they left him there. In this adaptation, he is portrayed as a Yankee, although this is not specified in the book.
- David Harewood as Billy Bones, formerly Flint's first mate, who precipitates the whole adventure by dying in the Admiral Benbow inn. In this adaptation he is portrayed as Jamaican.
- Julian Barratt as Redruth. In the book, Tom Redruth was Trelawney's elderly gamekeeper and accompanied the expedition to Treasure Island, where he was killed. In this adaptation, he is Trelawney's ruthless agent; he remains in England, where he repossesses the Admiral Benbow from Meg Hawkins.
- Shirley Henderson as Meg Hawkins, Jim Hawkins' mother, recently widowed landlady of the Admiral Benbow inn. Her first name is not given in the book.
- Nina Sosanya as Alibe Silver, Silver's wife, who flees to the Admiral Benbow to get away from Black Dog and befriends Meg Hawkins. The character has essentially been invented for this adaptation, although the book does state that Silver has an (unseen) wife, a "woman of colour" whom he leaves in charge of his inn.
- Geoff Bell as Israel Hands, formerly Captain Flint's gunner, later a crewman on the Hispaniola and one of the leaders of the mutineers. In the book he serves as the Hispaniola's coxswain and is described as a good seaman, but in this adaptation this role has been taken over by Abraham Gray and Silver says that Hands is a poor seaman (although a good gunner).
- Shaun Parkes as George Merry, a former member of Flint's crew and boatswain (and later mate) of the Hispaniola and a mutineer. In the book he is a simple crewman (although also a former member of Flint's crew) and leads the discontent against Silver's leadership.
- Keith Allen as Blind Pew, a former member of Flint's crew, now a blind beggar
- Sean Gilder as Black Dog, a former member of Flint's crew
- Barnaby Kay as Tom Morgan, a former member of Flint's crew and later of Hispaniola's and a mutineer. He is described in the book, in which he was also a member of Flint's crew, as elderly and "mahogany-faced" (although it is not specified whether this means he is heavily tanned or black).
- Clinton Blake as Freddie Arrow, the Hispaniola's first mate. In the book he is the only mate, an appalling officer who disappears one night (presumably fallen overboard while drunk), but in this adaptation (in which he is portrayed as Jamaican) he dies after being keel-hauled by Trelawney after striking him (also while drunk). He is not given a first name in the book.
- Tom Fisher as Abraham Gray, the Hispaniola's coxswain and the only survivor among the seamen who refuse to join the mutineers. In the book, Gray (the carpenter's mate, not the coxswain, as Hands holds that position) initially joins the mutineers, but then defects after Captain Smollett appeals to his better nature.
- Madhur Mittal as Dick Johnson, a young former member of Flint's crew and later a crewman on the Hispaniola and one of the mutineers. In the book, Johnson is the youngest hand on the Hispaniola and is persuaded to join the mutiny by Silver. He is not a former member of Flint's crew.
- David Wilmot as William O'Brien, one of the mutineers. His first name is not given in the book.
- Chu Omambala as Job Anderson, one of Flint's crew who later serves on the Hispaniola. In the book he is the ship's boatswain and effectively takes over as mate after Arrow disappears, but in this adaptation this role has been taken over by George Merry. The book does not say whether or not he was a member of Flint's crew.
- Lorenzo Grozco as Allardyce, one of Flint's crew who helps him bury his treasure and whose skeleton is later used as a pointer by Flint.
- Alfredo Salgado as Jeremiah Darby, one of Flint's crew who helps him bury his treasure. He is not named in the book.
- Ruaidhri Conroy as John Hunter, one of Trelawney's servants, who accompanies the expedition and is killed on Treasure Island.
- Mal Whyte as Richard Joyce, Trelawney's valet, who accompanies the expedition and is killed on Treasure Island.
- Tom Wu as Joe Thoby, a Chinese seaman on the Hispaniola who refuses to join the mutiny, whereupon Silver kills him. In the book this is a man named Tom, an old friend of Silver's.
- Damien Hannaway as Alan Tab, a crewman of the Hispaniola killed by the mutineers after he refuses to join them. His surname is not given in the book.
- Siobhan O'Kelly as Mrs Livesey, now deceased and only appearing in flashback
- Tommy O'Neill as Salt

== Reception ==
The series was moderately well received by critics, with praise towards its production values and cast, but some criticism leveled at the direction and changes to the original story.

Sam Wollaston of The Guardian wrote, "They've changed it, not just unnecessarily but unquestionably for the worse, and that's a travesty. Robert Louis Stevenson, Captain Flint, Davy Jones, will be turning in their graves/lockers." Rachel Ward of The Telegraph, however, called it "an imaginative take", said "Izzard excels as both villain and hero, and brings his trademark humour to the role ('Let’s parle'), though it would have been nice to hear a few more squawks from his pet parrot", and praised the action.
