= Treasure Island (1950 film) =

Adventure film by Byron Haskin

- Theatrical release poster
- Directed by: Byron Haskin
- Written by: Lawrence Edward Watkin
- Based on: Treasure Island by Robert Louis Stevenson
- Produced by: Walt Disney; Perce Pearce
- Starring: Bobby Driscoll; Robert Newton; Basil Sydney; Finlay Currie
- Cinematography: Freddie Young
- Edited by: Alan Jaggs
- Music by: Clifton Parker
- Production company: RKO-Walt Disney British Productions Limited
- Distributed by: RKO Radio Pictures
- Release dates: June 22, 1950 (London); July 29, 1950 (United States); July 19, 1950
- Running time: 96 minutes
- Countries: United States; United Kingdom
- Language: English
- Budget: $1.8 million
- Box office: $4.1 million (worldwide rentals)

Treasure Island is a 1950 adventure film produced by RKO-Walt Disney British Productions, adapted from Robert Louis Stevenson's 1883 novel of the same name. Directed by Byron Haskin, it stars Bobby Driscoll as Jim Hawkins and Robert Newton as Long John Silver. Treasure Island was Disney's first completely live-action film and the first screen version of Treasure Island produced in color. It was filmed in the United Kingdom on location and at Denham Film Studios, Buckinghamshire.

Newton's portrayal of Long John Silver has been influential on the portrayal of pirates in pop culture.

== Plot ==
In the West Coast of England in 1765, young Jim Hawkins lives with his mother in a country inn that they run. Captain William Bones, a sickly lodger, gives Jim a treasure map after receiving the "black spot" from two strangers. Squire Trelawney and Dr. Livesey accompany Jim to the inn, finding Bones dead. Trelawney recognizes the map as belonging to the legendary pirate Captain Flint and hires Captain Smollett and his ship, the Hispaniola, to find it, hiring Dr. Livesey as the ship's doctor and Jim as the cabin boy.

Before departure, Long John Silver, a one-legged innkeeper, agrees to gather a crew and joins the expedition as the ship's cook. Smollett is concerned about the crew, especially because the nature of their journey is common knowledge. At sea, Silver convinces Jim to steal Livesey's medical rum. During a storm, first mate Arrow, drunk from food specially prepared by Silver, falls overboard and drowns. Later, Jim overhears Silver discussing a planned mutiny, discovering that the seamen hired by Silver are Captain Flint's old crew and that the alcohol he lent was used by Silver to cause Arrow's death, Jim reveals the treachery to Smollett, who asks Jim to maintain his friendship with Silver to learn more. Upon reaching Treasure Island, Silver offers to tow the ship to a safer anchorage, using two of the ship's rowboats. While the ship is being towed, one of Silver's men, Merry, stages the mutiny. Smollett forces the mutineers into the hold, but Silver cuts the rowboats from the Hispaniola and heads toward the shore with the rest of his men, taking Jim as a hostage. Smollett, Trelawney and Livesey go ashore after them.

On Treasure Island, Jim escapes and meets Ben Gunn, marooned by Flint five years ago. Gunn shows Jim the boat that he has built and leads him to Flint's old stockade, where he meets Smollett and the others. Merry escapes, takes the Hispaniola, and raises the Jolly Roger. Short of men, Silver attempts to parlay with Smollett, but when he is rebuffed, the mutineers stage an attack. The assault on the stockade fails, but Silver wounds Smollett. Although seemingly protected by the stockade, Smollett surmises that, with the morning tide, Silver could move the Hispaniola into cannon range and level the fort.

Jim takes Gunn's boat and cuts the Hispaniola's anchor rope. The pirate Israel Hands discovers Jim and chases him into the ship's rigging, where Jim shoots him dead despite being wounded. The Hispaniola runs aground, and Jim strikes the Jolly Roger and hoists the Union Jack. Slowed by his wound, which becomes infected by swamp water, it takes him all night to return to the unguarded stockade. Inside the stockade, Jim searches for the doctor to mend his wound, but the man asleep under Livesey's coat is Long John Silver, causing Jim to faint on the spot. Silver finds the map on Jim as his men awaken.

Merry wants Jim dead, but Silver deceives his men into believing that Smollett has the map so he can "trade" it for Jim. While attempting to signal the captain, Silver sees that the ship is aground and flying the Union Jack and mistakenly believes that Smollett's party has recaptured the ship. The other pirates give Silver the black spot, but he refuses to acknowledge it. They let him bargain with Livesey, who has come to treat Jim, for the map.

Silver secretly barters with Livesey for leniency in court, inadvertently revealing that the ship is no longer under his control. Livesey agrees only when Jim insists on staying out of loyalty to Silver. Livesey leaves and Silver returns with Jim, flaunting the map to convince his men that his bargain was successful. The pirates are overjoyed and retake the black spot, then proceed on a grueling treasure hunt. When they finally reach the spot where the £700,000 treasure is supposed to be buried, they discover instead an empty pit, save for one guinea. A fight breaks out, and only the arrival of Smollett saves Silver's life. Gunn then reveals that he buried Flint's treasure in a second, secret location.

Despite keeping his end of the bargain, Captain Smollett still wants Silver returned to England to stand trial for his mutiny. Hawkins, Trelawney and two others take Silver to the Hispaniola aboard a rowboat loaded with a few chests of treasure. Silver snatches Jim's pistol and forces Trelawney and the others from the boat but commands Jim to remain in order to steer him out of the cove. Jim instead beaches him on a sandbar, and Silver orders him to push him at gunpoint, but Jim refuses. Silver is unable to execute his threat to shoot and drops the pistol in the water, attempting to push the boat off on his own. Seeing Silver struggle, Jim helps him, waving a hesitant farewell as Silver rows away with the treasure and bids him farewell in return.

== Cast ==
- Bobby Driscoll as Jim Hawkins
- Robert Newton as Long John Silver
- Basil Sydney as Captain Smollett
- Walter Fitzgerald as Squire Trelawney
- Denis O'Dea as Dr. Livesey
- Finlay Currie as Capt. Billy Bones
- Ralph Truman as George Merry
- Geoffrey Keen as Israel Hands
- Geoffrey Wilkinson as Ben Gunn
- John Laurie as Blind Pew
- Francis de Wolff as Black Dog
- David Davies as Mr. Arrow
- John Gregson as Tom Redruth
- Andrew Blackett as Gray
- Ken Buckle as Joyce
- William Devlin as Morgan
- Howard Douglas as Williams
- Harry Locke as Haggott
- Sam Kydd as Cady
- Stephen Jack as Job
- Harold Jamieson as Scully
- Diarmuid Kelly as Bolen
- Patrick Troughton as Roach

== Production ==
Treasure Island was produced by RKO-Walt Disney British Productions, Ltd., a joint venture owned by Walt Disney Productions and RKO Radio Pictures. Walt Disney had been planning an adaptation of Treasure Island, originally intended to be animated, since the 1930s. Disney acquired the film rights to the novel from Metro-Goldwyn-Mayer, which had been planning on producing its own adaptation, in 1949. Disney decided to film the production in the United Kingdom with financial assistance from RKO so that both studios could use frozen funds from ticket sales of their films released in Britain, which were required to be spent on film productions in the country.

Filming occurred between July 4 and November 11, 1949. Exterior scenes were shot in Cornwall (River Fal, Falmouth, Carrick Roads, Gull Rock and Helford River), Devon (cliff scenes), Bristol (wharf) and Iver Heath in Buckinghamshire. Interiors were filmed at Denham Film Studios, Denham, Buckinghamshire. The ship scenes were filmed aboard the Ryelands, a real schooner from the 19th century.

The casting of Bobby Driscoll, the film's only American actor, violated British labour laws as he did not possess a Ministry of Labour permit to work in the United Kingdom and was two years younger than the minimum age to obtain one. A court in Beaconsfield fined Driscoll, his father, and Walt Disney Productions £100 each and prohibited Driscoll from further work on the film. Disney completed Driscoll's scenes and returned him to the United States while his case was under appeal. The appeals court ruled that Disney had "brazenly flouted British law".

== Reception ==
In a contemporary review for The New York Times, critic Thomas M. Pryor called the film "a grand and glorious entertainment" and wrote: "It is a tingling, suspenseful diversion which expresses in eloquent pictorial terms all of the suppressed craving for adventure that sometimes prompts little boys to wander off into the wooded pathways of life and sets the rest of us to daydreaming about excitements which are denied fulfillment by the inhibitions of advancing age. 'Treasure Island' is simply fascinating."

Variety praised the film for its "sumptuous" set pieces and "a virtual tour de force" performance by Newton. Sonia Stein of The Washington Post wrote that the film was "like a treasure chest of precious stones", with "some of the most beautiful color photography ever shot". Harrison's Reports called it a "first-rate adventure melodrama that should thrill young and old alike", while Philip Hamburger of The New Yorker called it "absolutely first-class ... mounted in Technicolor with such meticulous and imaginative care that I had the feeling throughout that I was watching a handsome illustrated edition of the book come to life." The Monthly Film Bulletin called the production values "serviceable rather than imaginative" and found Driscoll to be "unmistakably 20th century-American in this context" and "insufficiently an actor to have much of a shot at Jim".

=== Box office ===
The film earned $4,100,000, of which $2,100,000 was generated in the U.S. and Canada. It was the sixth-most popular film at the British box office in 1950.

=== Rerelease ===
Walt Disney Productions rereleased the film in the U.S. in 1975. The MPAA assigned a PG rating, but Disney had a G-only policy that would not be relaxed for another four years to allow PG-rated films. To achieve a G rating, the studio removed footage "during a sword fighting scene where several cast members are stabbed or cut with swords and shed blood."

=== Sequel ===
In 1954, Robert Newton reprised his role of Long John Silver in the sequel film Long John Silver, also directed by Byron Haskin but not a Disney production. Newton also played the role in the Australian television series The Adventures of Long John Silver.

== Home video ==
The film was released in VHS format in the U.S. in 1981, 1985, 1991, 1996 and 1997 and on laserdisc in 1983 and 1992. While the original videotape and laserdisc releases contained the edited G-rated version, by the early 1990s the studio restored the original theatrical cut that had received a PG rating. Every release since 1991, including the 2003 DVD release, has been the uncut 96-minute version. The film was released on Blu-ray through the Disney Movie Club in 2015.

The film was available to stream on Disney+ when the service launched on November 12, 2019.

== Legacy ==
Newton's portrayal of Long John Silver is often regarded as a major influence on the portrayal of a pirate in subsequent years. His exaggeration of his native West Country accent is credited with popularizing the stereotypical "pirate speech" and the annual International Talk Like a Pirate Day. The characters of Jack Sparrow and Hector Barbossa are based on Long John Silver as portrayed in Treasure Island. The film's copyright was renewed in 1977.

== Comic-book adaptation ==
- Dell Four Color #624 (April 1955)

== See also ==
- Return to Treasure Island, a 10-part 1986 Disney Channel sequel coproduced by Disney with HTV and starring Brian Blessed as Long John Silver
- 1950 in film
- List of American films of 1950
- List of Walt Disney Pictures films
- Crumb (1994)
