= Silver (Motion novel) =

Novel by Andrew Motion

- First edition hardcover
- Author: Andrew Motion
- Language: English
- Publisher: Jonathan Cape
- Publication date: 15 March 2012
- Publication place: United Kingdom
- Media type: Print (hardcover and paperback)
- Pages: 404 pp
- ISBN: 978-0-224-091190
- Followed by: The New World

Silver: Return to Treasure Island is a novel by former British Poet Laureate Andrew Motion, published by Jonathan Cape on 15 March 2012. The book follows Jim Hawkins, son of the character of the same name in Robert Louis Stevenson's 1883 novel Treasure Island, as he and Natty, daughter of Long John Silver, also a character in Treasure Island, return to the island visited by their fathers to claim abandoned bar silver.
