= Treasure Island (1990 film) =

1990 television film by Fraser Clarke Heston

- US Poster
- Based on: Treasure Island by Robert Louis Stevenson
- Written by: Fraser Clarke Heston
- Directed by: Fraser Clarke Heston
- Starring: Charlton Heston; Christian Bale; Oliver Reed; Christopher Lee; Richard Johnson; Julian Glover
- Music by: Paddy Moloney, The Chieftains
- Countries of origin: United Kingdom; United States
- Original language: English

Production
- Executive producer: Peter Snell
- Producer: Fraser Clarke Heston
- Cinematography: Robert Steadman
- Running time: 132 minutes
- Production companies: Turner Pictures; Agamemnon Films; British Lion Film Corporation

Original release
- Network: TNT
- Release: January 22, 1990

Treasure Island is a 1990 British-American made-for-television film adaptation of Robert Louis Stevenson’s 1883 novel of the same name, written, produced and directed by Fraser Clarke Heston and starring his father Charlton Heston along with several notable British actors, including Christian Bale, Oliver Reed, Christopher Lee, Richard Johnson and Julian Glover.

The film was an original production filmed and aired by the TNT network, and was also released theatrically outside the US. The title has appeared on some covers as Devils Treasure, rather than Treasure Island. This version of the story is noted for its faithfulness to the book, with much of the dialogue coming directly from it, as well as recreating several of the more violent scenes from the book.

== Plot ==
Captain Bones, an elderly pirate, arrives at the Admiral Benbow inn, owned by Jim Hawkins and his widowed mother. Bones spends his days keeping watch for a one-legged man and making a dangerous nuisance of himself.

One day, pirate Black Dog appears at the inn, sword fights Bones, and retreats. Bones begins to suffer cardiac arrest, but before Jim can help him, former pirate Blind Pew arrives, gives Bones the Black Spot and leaves. Bones gives Jim the key to his chest and dies.

Mrs. Hawkins and Jim search Bones' chest for the rent he owes them. Jim takes a packet of papers, but Pew and Black Dog return with more pirates and attack the Hawkinses for the papers. Dr. Livesey and his men arrive, scattering the pirates and killing Pew. Livesey and Jim take the papers to Squire Trelawney. One of the papers is a map by Captain Flint, who buried £700,000 on the island shown.

Trelawney procures the ship Hispaniola, and hires Captain Smollett. One-legged publican Long John Silver is hired as cook, and convinces Trelawney to hire his friends as sailors. Livesey and Jim come aboard as ship's doctor and cabin boy. Smollett starts making plans in case of mutiny, annoying Trelawney, who believes Smollett is too suspicious.

Later on, Jim climbs into an apple barrel to get one for Trelawney. He overhears three sailors - Silver, Israel Hands, and Dick Johnson- planning a mutiny. After land is sighted, Jim hurries to Livesey, Trelawney, and Smollet, who secretly plan their own offensive.

Smollett allows some of the crew to go ashore, so there are fewer mutineers on the Hispaniola to deal with. He, Trelawney, and Livesey gather Trelawney's servants (Hunter, Joyce, and Redruth) and hole up in the ship's cabin. Jim sneaks ashore to spy on Silver, witnesses the murder of two sailors who refuse to join the mutiny, and finds Ben Gunn, whom Flint marooned on the island three years prior.

Livesy and Hunter also sneak ashore, find Flint's old stockade, and arrange for their party to change their base of operations. However, Hands uses the cannon to sink the jolly boat while Smollett's party is rowing to shore in it, and in the ensuing pursuit across the island, Redruth is shot dead. Gunn guides Jim to the stockade, giving him a cryptic message to take to the Squire.

The next morning, Silver tries and fails to parley with Smollett for the map. The pirates storm the stockade, wounding Joyce and the Captain, but are driven away with heavy losses. That night, Jim steals Gunn's coracle, sails to the Hispaniola and cuts the anchor line. Hands, badly wounded after a fight on board, agrees to help Jim beach the Hispaniola, then attempts to stab him in the back after the ship runs aground. Jim flees into the shrouds; Hands throws the knife, cutting Jim's shoulder, and Jim shoots and kills Hands.

Jim returns to the stockade to find his friends gone and the mutineers there instead. Jim bravely admits he has caused most of their problems, and Silver is nearly deposed by George Merry, who wishes to kill Jim. Silver reveals he bargained with Livesey for the map - seeing the treasure map, the pirates return to Silver's side and decide to keep Jim alive as a hostage. The next day, Livesey comes to treat some of the pirates, and Jim confides to him about the Hispaniola, and that he owes his life to Silver. Livesey hurries back to tell the others.

The pirates set off with the map in search of the treasure. Along the way, they are frightened by "Captain Flint's" voice calling out, unaware it is Gunn teasing them. They discover the treasure has already been looted. Merry leads the pirates once more in rebellion against Silver; Livesey's party arrives and drives them off. Silver, Jim, and the Doctor's party return to Gunn's cave; Gunn found and moved the treasure there many months prior. They load the Hispaniola and set sail for home.

Silver, unwilling to stand trial for his crimes, threatens Gunn and steals a gig, sailing off to freedom. The rest take their treasure home, and Jim vows never to return to the cursed island.

== Cast ==
- Charlton Heston as Long John Silver
- Christian Bale as Jim Hawkins
- Oliver Reed as Billy Bones
- Christopher Lee as Blind Pew
- Richard Johnson as Squire Trelawney
- Julian Glover as Dr Livesey
- Isla Blair as Mrs Hawkins
- Clive Wood as Captain Smollet
- Nicholas Amer as Ben Gunn
- John Abbott as Joyce
- James Cosmo as Redruth
- James Coyle as Morgan
- Michael Halsey as Israel Hands
- Michael Thoma as Hunter
- Pete Postlethwaite as George Merry
- Robert Putt as Job Anderson
- John Benfield as Black Dog
- Richard Beale as Mr Arrow
- Brett Fancy as Young Tom
- Steven Mackintosh as Dick
- Bill Sloan as Scarface

== Production ==
Treasure Island was filmed in 1989 on location in North Devon, England, in Jamaica, and also at Pinewood Studios.

The fictional Hispaniola was portrayed by the sailing ship Bounty. She was originally constructed for the film Mutiny on the Bounty, and was set to be destroyed at the end of the film but Marlon Brando protested. In October 2012 she sank off the coast of the Carolinas during Hurricane Sandy.

== Critical reception ==
According to Allmovie, Charlton Heston "plays the character of Long John Silver as written: a cold, crafty, cunning rogue, by turns charming and deadly, but never to be underestimated" and, unlike other filmed versions of the story, the movie "adheres with utter fidelity to the Stevenson novel". However, Tom Shales of The Washington Post called the film "a dreary and confused new production" with an "embarrassingly poor performance of Charlton Heston as Long John Silver, a laborious mistake... one of the most humorless hulks who ever stood before a camera..."

== Home media ==
The film was released on VHS and Laserdisc. It was released on DVD on September 27, 2011.

== Box office ==
It made £306,083 at the UK box office.
