= Treasure Island (1934 film) =

1934 film

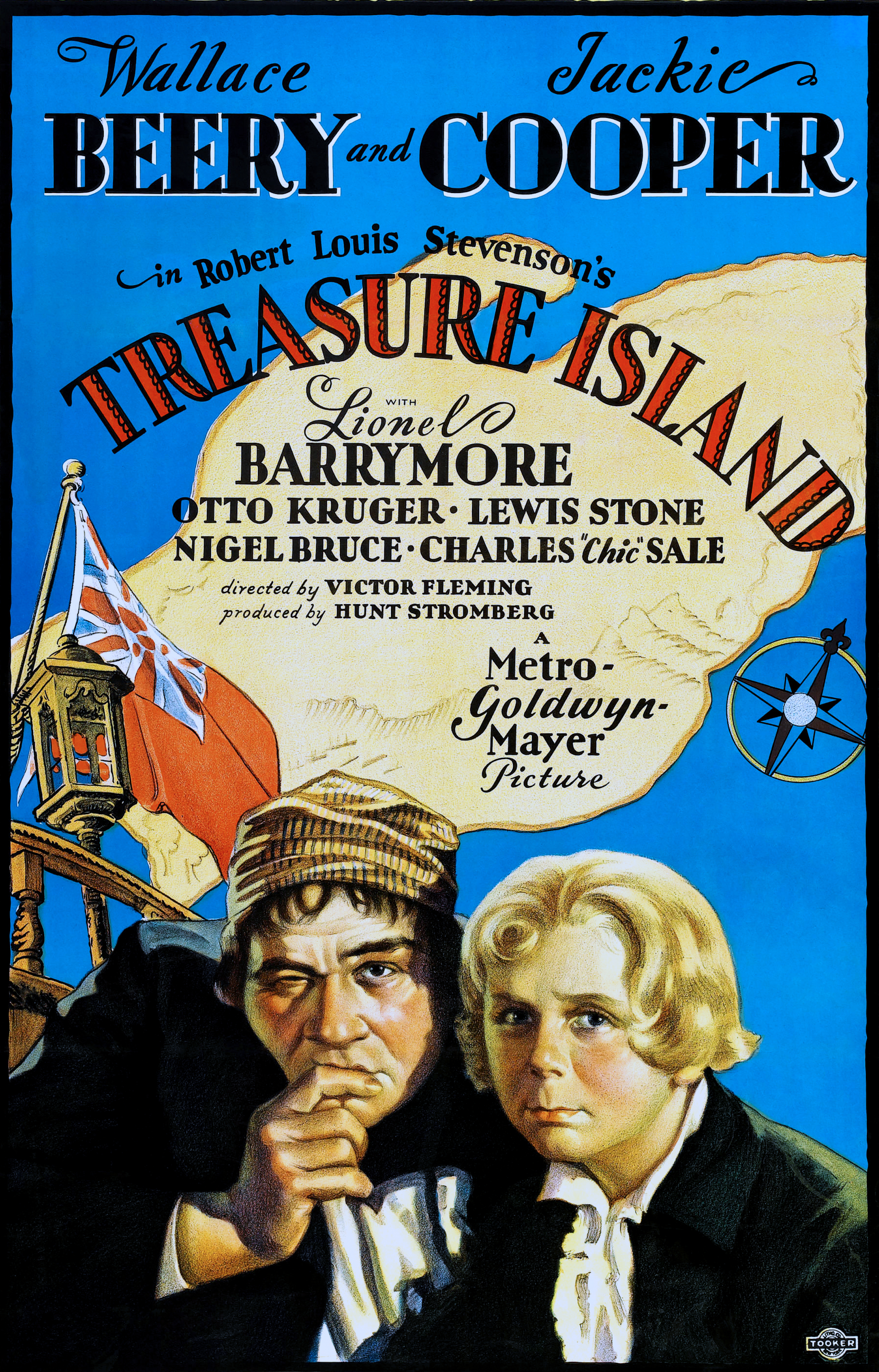
- Theatrical poster
- Directed by: Victor Fleming
- Screenplay by: John Lee Mahin; John Howard Lawson; Leonard Praskins
- Based on: Treasure Island; 1883 novel by Robert Louis Stevenson
- Produced by: Hunt Stromberg
- Starring: Wallace Beery; Jackie Cooper; Lionel Barrymore; Lewis Stone; Nigel Bruce
- Cinematography: Clyde De Vinna; Ray June; Harold Rosson
- Edited by: Blanche Sewell
- Music by: Herbert Stothart (original score); Thomas Augustine Arne ("Rule Britannia")
- Production company: Metro-Goldwyn-Mayer
- Distributed by: Loew's, Inc.
- Release date: August 17, 1934
- Running time: 105 minutes
- Country: United States
- Language: English
- Budget: $825,000
- Box office: $2.4 million (worldwide rentals)

Treasure Island is a 1934 American adventure film directed by Victor Fleming and starring Wallace Beery, Jackie Cooper, Lionel Barrymore, Lewis Stone, and Nigel Bruce.

The film is an adaptation of Robert Louis Stevenson's famous 1883 novel Treasure Island. Jim Hawkins discovers a treasure map and travels on a sailing ship to a remote island, but pirates led by Long John Silver threaten to take away the honest seafarers’ riches and lives.

== Plot ==
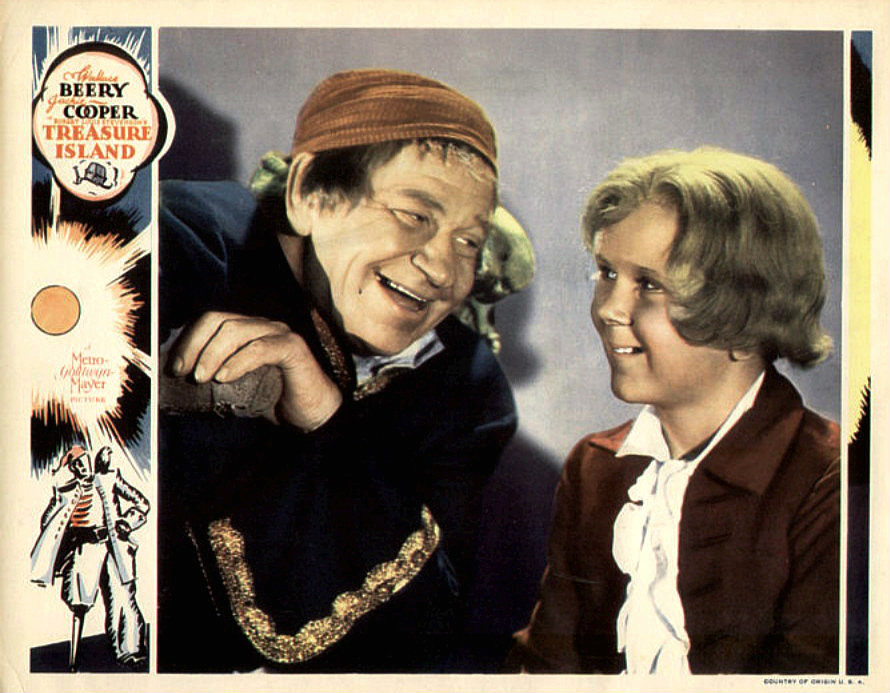
Lobby card with Wallace Beery and Jackie Cooper

Young Jim Hawkins and his mother run the Admiral Benbow, a tavern near Bristol, England. One dark and stormy night, during a birthday celebration, the mysterious Billy Bones arrives and drunkenly talks about treasure. He carries with him a chest, which he brags contains gold and jewels. Soon after, Bones is visited by Black Dog then Pew, and drops dead. When Jim opens the chest, he just finds a map. His friend Dr. Livesey realizes that the map will lead them to the famous Flint treasure.

Squire Trelawney raises money for a voyage to the treasure island and they set sail on Captain Alexander Smollett's ship Hispaniola. Also on board is the one-legged Long John Silver and his cronies. Even though Bones had previously warned Jim about a sailor with one leg, Silver and he become friends.

During the voyage, several fatal "accidents" happen to sailors who disapprove of Silver and his cohorts. Then, the night before landing on the island, Jim overhears Silver plotting to take the treasure and kill Smollett's men. Jim goes ashore with the men, and encounters an old hermit named Ben Gunn, who tells him that he has found Flint's treasure.

Meanwhile, Smollett and his loyal men flee to Flint's stockade on the island for safety. Silver's men then attack the stockade when Smollett refuses to give them the treasure map. While the situation looks hopeless, Jim secretly goes back to the Hispaniola at night, sails it to a safe location and shoots one of the pirates in self-defense. When he returns to the stockade, Silver's men are there and Silver tells them that a treaty has been signed. The pirates want to kill Jim, but Silver protects him. Dr. Livesey comes for Jim, but the boy refuses to break his word to Silver not to run away.

The next day the pirates search for the treasure hold and when they find it, it is empty. When some of the pirates mutiny against Silver, Livesey and Gunn join him in the fight. Smollett sails home with the treasure, which Gunn had hidden in his cave, and with Silver as his prisoner. Silver tells Jim a horror story of a slow death by hanging. Unable to stand by and let his friend be hanged, Jim frees Silver. As he sails away, Silver promises to hunt treasure with Jim again some day, as Honest John Silver.

== Cast ==
- Wallace Beery as Long John Silver
- Jackie Cooper as Jim Hawkins
- Lionel Barrymore as Billy Bones
- Otto Kruger as Doctor Livesey
- Lewis Stone as Captain Smollett
- Nigel Bruce as Squire Trelawney
- Charles "Chic" Sale as Ben Gunn
- William V. Mong as Pew
- Charles McNaughton as Black Dog
- Dorothy Peterson as Mrs. Hawkins
- Vernon Downing as Inn Boy
- As Pirates of the Spanish Main:
  - Douglass Dumbrille (Israel Hands)
  - Edmund Breese (Job Anderson)
  - Olin Howland (Dick)
  - Charles Irwin (Abraham Gray)
  - Edward Pawley (William O'Brien)
  - Richard Powell (Post)
  - James Burke (George Merry)
  - John Anderson (Harry Sykes)
  - Charles Bennett (Dandy Dawson)
- Harry Cording as Henry (uncredited)
- J. M. Kerrigan as Tom Morgan (uncredited)

== Production notes ==
Wallace Beery as Long John Silver

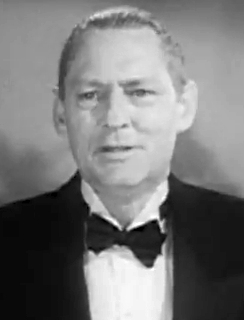
Lionel Barrymore as Billy Bones

In 1920, Paramount replaced Wallace Beery with Joseph Singleton as Israel Hands in Maurice Tourneur's silent lost film Treasure Island. Beery worked with Tourneur that same year in his silent masterpiece The Last of the Mohicans.

After the massive success of The Champ (1931), Beery and Jackie Cooper were paired again in O'Shaughnessy's Boy and The Bowery. Treasure Island was the last time they filmed together. While rehearsing with a pistol on the set, Cooper shot Beery in the foot with flash powder. Beery's yowls of pain were met with delight by the crew, who despised him.

Cooper later realized he was too young to play Jim Hawkins, especially when Louis B. Mayer insisted on wedging in a trademark crying scene for Cooper. Beery was so resentful of having to reshoot the ending that his misbehavior stretched the daylong shoot into nearly a week of work.

Cooper cited Victor Fleming, along with King Vidor, as one of the directors he respected the most,

"When I was a kid, directors were always offering me bicycles whenever they wanted me to play a difficult scene...By the time I was ten, I had eight or nine bikes in the garage. Fleming would speak to me like an adult. He would talk to me about the scene. I felt he respected me. As a result, I would break my neck to please him."

The pirate ship Hispaniola was impersonated by Nanuk, which had been converted from a schooner to a full-rigged ship. The ship was moored in Catalina's Emerald Bay for the three-month shoot. Victor Fleming wanted to film in color in the South Seas. When MGM refused, he threatened to quit.

The screenplay began with the burying of Captain Flint's treasure and showed Long John Silver losing his leg. Fleming felt the movie should begin at Benbow Inn and cut the pages. The screenplay also included the scene where Silver's men give him the Black Spot, but during a test screening, Fleming noticed the audience was restless. He knew they were more interested in Jim and his friends, and the scene was removed. Fleming designed the production to emulate N.C. Wyeth's illustrations for the 1911 edition.

== Reception ==
Treasure Island recouped its cost, quickly earning $525,000 over its $825,000 budget. It was MGM's third biggest film of the season with domestic rentals of $1,164,000 and foreign rentals of $1,100,000. Its 1937–38 reissue earned an additional $144,000. Treasure Island's success was instrumental in vaulting Fleming to the top of his profession. Producers felt safe entrusting big pictures with Fleming, and he would finish the decade with two of the industry's biggest: The Wizard of Oz and Gone with the Wind.

Hollywood was undergoing a tonal shift, partially due to the federal government's intervention via the National Recovery Administration. The NRA seal is displayed prominently at the start of the film, and faintly over the closing title card. Films got less sensational that year, in particular at MGM. The New York Times felt Treasure Island failed to strike the same balance between sophistication and simplicity that other MGM titles did, such as The Thin Man and Viva Villa!

In The New Republic, Otis Ferguson derided the sentimental ending, but raved that Treasure Island demonstrated,

"what fresh possibilities in the way of beauty and free movement lie in this new art of the screen. The frank swagger of the story was caught from the first, and somewhere near the first there was a fine sequence of the ship getting under weigh, one of the most lovely I have seen."

Writing for The Spectator in 1936, Graham Greene favorably compared the film to Midshipman Easy, describing Treasure Island as having "a deeper, a more poetic value", with characters and events providing rich symbolism and a palpable sense of good and evil.

In Maurice Tourneur's Treasure Island from 14 years earlier, Jim Hawkins is played by a 19-year old girl: Shirley Mason. Critics howled at the effeminate portrayal of a classic boy adventurer. Fleming did not revise the character much, showing Cooper blubbering so often that he comes across as a "simpering mama's boy".

== See also ==
- National Recovery Administration (NRA), the logo displayed at start and end of film.
