= Treasure Island (1972 film) =

1972 live-action film adaption of Treasure Island

- Theatrical poster
- Directed by: John Hough
- Written by: Wolf Mankowitz; Orson Welles (as "O.W. Jeeves"); Uncredited; Bautista de la Casa; Hubert Frank; Antonio Margheriti; Gérard Vergez
- Based on: Treasure Island by Robert Louis Stevenson
- Produced by: Harry Alan Towers
- Starring: Orson Welles
- Cinematography: Cecilio Paniagua
- Music by: Natale Massara
- Production companies: Massfilms Limited; Seven Film; Eguiluz Films; Les Productions FDL
- Distributed by: National General Pictures
- Release date: 1972
- Running time: 94 minutes
- Countries: United Kingdom; France; West Germany; Italy; Spain

Treasure Island is a 1972 historical adventure film, based on the 1883 novel by Robert Louis Stevenson. The film stars Orson Welles as Long John Silver (albeit later dubbed entirely by Robert Rietti uncredited), Kim Burfield as Jim Hawkins, Walter Slezak as Squire Trelawney, Rik Battaglia as Captain Smollett, and Ángel del Pozo as Doctor Livesey.

This adaptation of Treasure Island was released in several different language versions, with different directors credited.

== Plot ==
Jim Hawkins (Kim Burfield) is a young boy who at the start of the story works at his mother's (Maria Rohm) inn. A drunken old sailor named Billy Bones (Lionel Stander) moves in and proceeds todrink heavily, terrorise locals with pirate songs and stories, and keeps watch for seafaring men. He dies of a stroke after violent confrontations with old shipmates. Jim gets his hands on a map which shows the whereabouts of pirate Captain Flint's treasure. Immediately taking action, he then enlists the help of Squire Trelawney (Walter Slezak) and Dr. Livesey (Angel DelPozo) to join him as he locates the island on the map. Together, they join a ship commanded by Captain Smollett (Rik Battaglia) that will lead them to their destination.

Word of the treasure map gets around and most of the crew are recruited with the help of the ship's cook, Long John Silver (Orson Welles), an ex-pirate who had sailed with Captain Flint and intends to get the treasure by mutiny and murder.

Already on the island is a marooned pirate, Ben Gunn, who has spent his time gathering the treasure. With his help Jim, the Squire, the Doctor, the Captain and a number of loyal crewmen outwit the pirates, killing most of them in gun battles.

Silver is captured, but escapes when the ship reaches harbour in the West Indies. Much of the plot and the linking narrative – spoken by Jim Hawkins – is faithful to the original book.

== Cast ==
Character	Original	English
Long John Silver	Orson Welles	Robert Rietti

- Kim Burfield as Jim Hawkins
- Lionel Stander as Billy Bones
- Walter Slezak as Squire Trelawney
- Ángel del Pozo as Doctor Livesey
- Rik Battaglia as Captain Smollett
- Jean Lefebvre as Ben Gunn
- Maria Rohm as Mrs. Hawkins
- Paul Muller as Blind Pew
- Michel Garland as George Merry
- Aldo Sambrell as Israel Hands

== Proposed 1960s version ==
=== Development ===
The film had its origins in Orson Welles's attempts to film his Shakespearean adaptation Chimes at Midnight in the early 1960s – a project he had worked on since the late 1930s.

After Welles had failed to convince numerous producers to finance his film, he tried an alternative approach: he wrote a screenplay for the more commercially appealing Treasure Island, and promised to make both films, back to back, filmed on the same sets and with the same cast, for barely more than the cost of one film. As well as having written the script, he proposed to direct Treasure Island and play Long John Silver.

According to Welles' assistant Juan Cobos, Welles was "afraid that Chimes wouldn't be a very appealing film at the box office and he proposed a remake of Treasure Island to the (producers). It was a way to cover the money deficit of Chimes with a more popular film based on (Robert Louis) Stevenson's classical novel."

Welles was a long-time admirer of the novel, and had performed it for radio in 1938. ""He loved the story, always did," said Beatrice Welles. "It's one of the books he read to me as a child."

This approach worked; Spanish producer Emiliano Piedra agreed to finance both films.

=== Cast and crew ===
The idea was to use sets and cast for both films, such as the inn.

The proposed cast for Treasure Island was as follows:

- Keith Baxter as Doctor Livesey
- John Gielgud as Squire Trelawney
- Fraser McIntosh as Jim Hawkins
- Orson Welles as Long John Silver

In order to get a local subsidy, the film needed a Spanish director and Spanish technicians. Welles suggested Jess Franco.

He would direct from a script by Welles. "We had a good script," said Welles. "It was loyal to Stevenson; my contribution was to keep it clear about just where the people were on the island, which Stevenson didn't always bother about... You don't notice it when you are reading, just when you are making a film script."

=== Shooting ===
Filming took place for a week on the Mediterranean coast of Alicante in 1964. It used a rented ship originally built for the Spanish-shot John Paul Jones (1959) and subsequently used in a number of other films.

Several scenes were allegedly shot, some of which Welles reportedly directed. Franco went on to help Welles for three weeks on shooting Chimes at Midnight. The two men had a disagreement after funding from Piedra ran out. Franco got Harry Saltzman to finance the completion of Chimes. Welles was unhappy with the arrangements and Franco left the project.

=== Attempts to revive the project ===
In March 1966, while filming Casino Royale in England, Welles said he planned to make the film the following month in Spain.

He said the film would be in colour, the budget would be $1.5 million and that part of the finance had been secured from Seven Arts Productions, who would distribute in the United States and Canada. Fergus McIntosh would play Jim Hawkins and Hugh Griffith would play an unspecified role. By December however it was clear the film was not going to be made.

== 1972 version ==
In October 1971, American producer Oliver Unger was going to remake Treasure Island from a script by Wolf Mankowitz, with Mark Lester announced for the role of Jim Hawkins, but it was never made.

Welles remained contractually tied to the 1964 project as both actor and writer, and eight years later in 1972 he was brought in to make the film again by producer Harry Alan Towers who had worked with Welles in radio. Welles still wanted to direct but Towers said he could not get a completion guarantee if that was the case, and so John Hough was brought in to do the job.

National General Pictures agreed to provide some finance and distribute in the United States.

Towers sourced a boat in the Thames to play the Hispaniola. A floating restaurant, he arranged for it to be shipped to Spain but it sank, although John Hough managed to find another boat two weeks before filming began.

Welles starred as Long John Silver and the film was shot in Spain with a Spanish crew. Welles said, "A lot of people wanted me to do Treasure Island in Greece. But the colonels have locked up a lot of my friends so naturally I never considered going there. Besides, Spain is my home and this is the place I would rather work." Filming took place in June 1972 in Almeria.

The roles of Jim Hawkins was played by 12-year-old English actor Kim Burfield, who had previously starred in an episode of Journey to the Unknown (1968-69) and the 1971 film Bloomfield.

According to one contemporary report the director at one stage was Italian Andrea Bianchi who said, "I knew all about the 'black legend' of Orson Welles. When he is in front of the camera, no matter who is in the director's chair, it is Welles who directs." After a tense initial two day period, Welles and Bianchi established a working relationship.

Towers says the director was Hough and that he and Welles did not get along.

Welles was sufficiently dismissive of the rewrites to his original script that he asked not to be credited, taking the pseudonym "O.W. Jeeves".

Welles claimed his performance was dubbed by another actor without his permission. Welles did record a dubbing session, but it was done over one long night in Paris, and it was felt that Welles' dubbing could not be understood. Because this was only a few weeks before the American cinema release, that version used Welles' voice. However, Towers says that Nat Cohen, who was in charge of the film's release in Britain and on American TV, insisted the voice be dubbed again. They hired Robert Rietty to do the job.

== Reception ==
The Los Angeles Times said it was "not as dashing and lively as one might have wished."
