= Ryelands (schooner) =

Ship built in 1887

The Ryelands (also named The Moby Dick), was built in England in 1887 and later came into the hands of the film industry in 1948 when RKO Pictures purchased it. The Ryelands was used in the 1950 film Treasure Island, and was later sold to Elstree Studios for her part in the 1956 film Moby Dick. It also starred in the TV series The Buccaneers, before becoming a floating exhibit at Morecambe, England, where it was destroyed by fire in 1972.
