= Ben Gunn (Treasure Island) =

Fictional character

- Treasure Island character
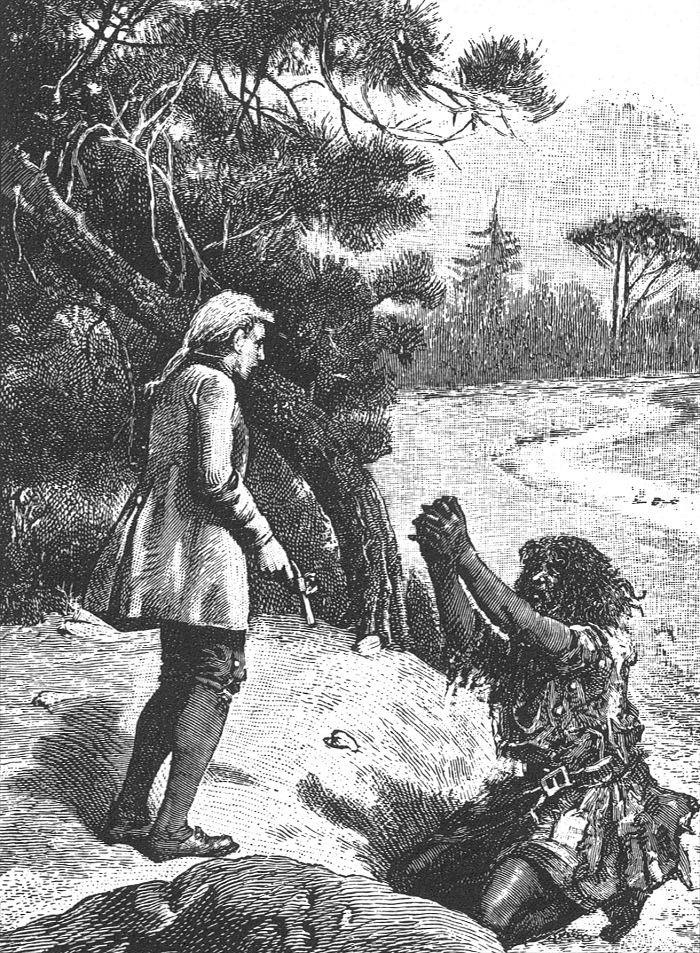
- Jim Hawkins and Ben Gunn
- Created by: Robert Louis Stevenson

In-universe information
- Full name: Benjamin Gunn
- Nickname: Ben
- Gender: Male
- Occupation: Pirate
- Religion: none
- Nationality: English

Benjamin "Ben" Gunn is a fictional character in the 1883 novel Treasure Island by Scottish author Robert Louis Stevenson.

== Appearances ==
=== Treasure Island ===
Ben Gunn is an ex-crewman of Captain Flint's who has been marooned for three years on Treasure Island by his crewmates, after his failure to find the treasure without the map. During his time alone on the island, Gunn develops an obsessional craving for cheese. He first appears in the novel when Jim Hawkins encounters him. Ben treats Jim kindly in return for a chance of getting back to civilization.

Jim leaves Ben Gunn behind but escapes to the Hispaniola on Ben's coracle. Ben appears later making ghostly sounds to delay Long John Silver's party searching for the treasure, but Silver recognizes his voice, restoring the pirates' confidence. They forge ahead and locate where Flint's treasure was buried. The pirates discover the cache has been rifled and all the treasure is gone.

The enraged pirates turn on Silver and Jim, but Ben Gunn and several others surprise-attack the pirates, killing two and dispersing the rest. Silver surrenders to Dr. Livesey, promising to return to his "dooty". They go to Ben Gunn's cave home, where Gunn has had the treasure hidden for some months. The treasure is divided amongst Squire Trelawney and his loyal men, including Jim and Ben Gunn - who gets a very small share, £1,000 (equivalent to £105,000 in 2025) of £700,000 (equivalent to £73,589,000 in 2025) total - and they return to England, leaving the surviving pirates marooned on the island.

Once in England, Gunn manages to spend his entire portion of the treasure in just a few days and becomes an estate gamekeeper for the rest of his life.

=== Porto Bello Gold ===
In the prequel story Porto Bello Gold, written by Arthur D. Howden Smith with explicit permission from Stevenson's executor and published in 1924, Ben Gunn is a servant of captain Andrew "Rip-Rap" Murray, a Jacobite privateer. The cunning Murray masterminds the capture of a Spanish treasure ship, having obtained details on its route through an elaborate ploy and his Jacobite connections. Murray considers Ben Gunn to be a "half-wit" and thus a particularly trustworthy servant, unable to understand Murray's schemes and incapable of deceit or treachery.

Captain Flint’s pirate band works with Murray in the operation and is promised just under half of the captured treasure, which is transferred from Murray’s Royal James to Flint’s Walrus at Captain Kidd’s Anchorage on Treasure Island. Mistrusting each other, Murray's and Flint's bands come to blows over the treasure, however. Flint's crew prevails, and in the aftermath Ben Gunn, although hating being a lackey and wearing a "livery-shuit", offers to serve Flint. Ben Gunn is given the exact same duties he had under Murray, being assigned as a servant to Flint's cabin boy Darby McGraw.

During in-fighting among the pirates over the treasure map following Flint's death in Savannah, Ben Gunn and Darby McGraw escape to Charleston with the protagonists and a small amount of gold. Still fearful of a life as a servant, he insists on becoming a proper sailor and the protagonists find him a berth on a Barbados packet boat.

=== The Adventures of Ben Gunn ===
Ben Gunn is the main character in The Adventures of Ben Gunn, a prequel to Treasure Island written by R. F. Delderfield. The story follows Ben Gunn from parson's son to pirate and is narrated by Jim in Gunn's words.

== Inspiration ==
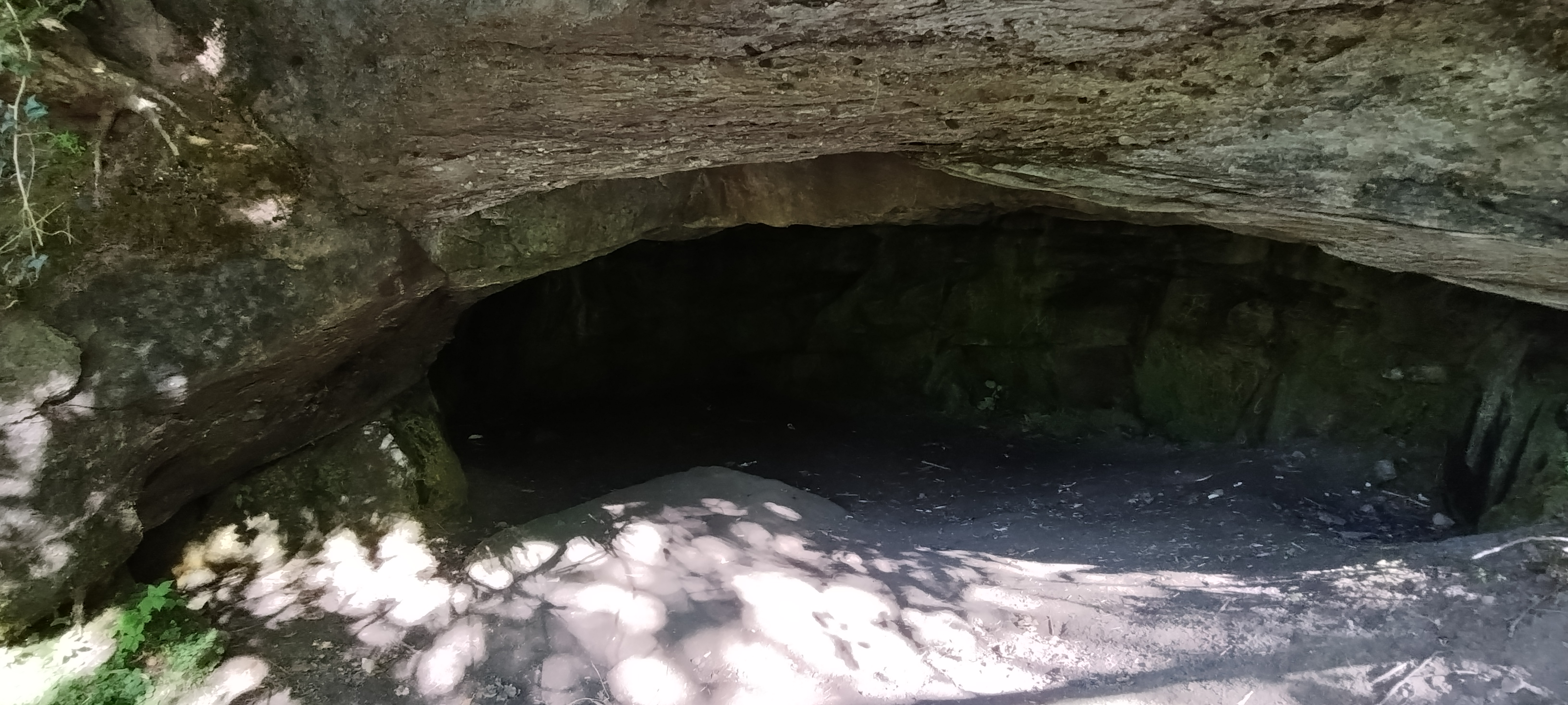
"Stevenson's Cave" in Bridge of Allan.

As a child, Stevenson repeatedly summered in the spa town of Bridge of Allan. "Stevenson's cave" in Bridge of Allan was reportedly the inspiration for Ben Gunn's dwelling.

== Other media ==
In the 1996 Disney film Muppet Treasure Island, this character was feminized as Benjamina Gunn (Miss Piggy) by Brian Henson and the scriptwriters, in which she is written as Captain Smollett's former fiancée who was jilted at the altar and later became romantically involved with Captain Flint before being marooned and made queen of the native wild boars on the island. By the end of the film, she and Smollett rekindle their relationship and she helps him against Silver's pirate crew.

In Disney's animated film Treasure Planet, Ben Gunn is portrayed as B.E.N. (voiced by Martin Short), an abandoned, whimsical robot who claims to have lost most of his memory (with B.E.N. standing for Bio-Electronic Navigator) after a component was stolen by Captain Flint. Jim and his group meet BEN while exploring the planet's forest, and the robot invites them to his house to care for the wounded Captain Amelia. When Silver's pirates corner the group here, using a back-door, Jim and BEN return to the ship in an attempt to recover the map. BEN, working to sabotage the ship's artillery, accidentally turns off the artificial gravity, whereupon Jim and Scroop, who were fighting, threaten to float off into space, which happens to Scroop. Later, Jim and BEN obtain the map. Upon their return, they are captured by Silver, who has already taken Doppler and Amelia prisoner. While searching the treasure stash, Jim discovers the skeletal remains of Flint himself, clutching a missing part of BEN’s cognitive computer. Jim re-inserts the memory circuit from Flint, which restores BEN’s memory. BEN then recalls that Flint had taken his memory to prevent him from revealing that the planet would begin collapsing if anyone tried to steal his treasure. After narrowly escaping the exploding planet, BEN joins Jim’s family and is last seen working at the rebuilt Benbow Inn.

For a time, in London there was an annual production at the Mermaid Theatre, originally under the direction of Bernard Miles, who played Long John Silver, a part he also played in a television version. Comedian Spike Milligan would often play Ben Gunn in these productions.

The Ben Gunn Society album released in 2003 presents the story centered around the character of Ben Gunn, based primarily on Chapter XV ("Man of the Island") and other relevant parts of the book.

Ben Gunn was the main inspiration for Herman Toothrot, a marooned and half-crazed hermit in the Monkey Island game series.

Ben Gunn is portrayed by Chris Fisher in the Starz television series Black Sails. He is first encountered by Captain Flint and his crew when they are captured and imprisoned after landing on an island inhabited by a large group of escaped slaves. Gunn is already a prisoner in the settlement, being the last surviving crew member of an unnamed slave trading vessel.

=== Film portrayal ===
Actors who portrayed Ben Gunn and what they appeared in
Actor	Version
Chic Sale	Treasure Island (1934 film)
Geoffrey Wilkinson	Treasure Island (1950 film)
Jean Lefebvre	Treasure Island (1972 live-action film)
Kaneta Kimotsuki	Treasure Island (1978 TV series)
Valeri Zolotukhin	Treasure Island (1982 film)
Tony Jessen	Treasure Island (1985 film)
Kenneth Colley	Return to Treasure Island (TV series)
Yury Yakovlev	Treasure Island (1988 film)
Nicholas Amer	Treasure Island (1990 film)
Chris Barrie	The Legends of Treasure Island (1993–1995)
Frank Oz (as Miss Piggy)	Muppet Treasure Island (1996)
Walter Sparrow	Treasure Island (1999 film)
Martin Short (as B.E.N.)	Treasure Planet
Leigh Scott	Pirates of Treasure Island
Elijah Wood	Treasure Island (2012 miniseries)
Chris Fisher	Black Sails (TV series)
