= Pirates of Treasure Island =

- DVD cover art
- Directed by: Leigh Scott
- Written by: Robert Louis Stevenson (novel, uncredited); Carlos De Los Rios (screenplay)
- Produced by: David Michael Latt; David Rimawi; Paul Bales
- Starring: Lance Henriksen; Tom Nagel; Jeff Denton; James Ferris; Leigh Scott; Rebekah Kochan
- Distributed by: The Asylum
- Release date: June 27, 2006
- Running time: 80 minutes
- Country: United States
- Language: English
- Budget: $ 1.5 million

Pirates of Treasure Island is a 2006 American comedy-drama film produced by The Asylum, loosely adapted from Robert Louis Stevenson's 1883 novel Treasure Island.

The film was criticized as an imitation of the Pirates of the Caribbean film series, particularly as was released just before, and shares several similarities with, Pirates of the Caribbean: Dead Man's Chest.

== Plot ==
The story opens on Skeleton Island, an uncharted island somewhere in the Falkland Islands chain, where Long John Silver and Billy Bones have staged a successful mutiny against Captain Flint. The group is attacked by gigantic insects, and retreats back to the ship. In the chaos, Long John has one of his legs torn off by a giant beetle.

In the United States in 1782, Jim Hawkins is the owner of the Admiral Benbow Inn, but has grown tired of a life of monotony and seeks adventure. One of his customers, Billy Bones, dies in his inn and leaves Jim a treasure map showing the way to a treasure buried on Skeleton Island.

After gaining the help of Dr. Livesey, Jim and Livesey recruit French mariner Captain Smollete, the captain of the schooner Hispaniola, to sail out to Skeleton Island, under the pretence of going to collect specimens of local wildlife. Jim and Livesey recruit Long John Silver, now using the alias of Barbecue, to act as ship's cook, with Long John providing the rest of the ship's crew.

As the Hispanola makes its way to the island, Hawkins unintentionally discovers Long John's true intentions: to steal the map and to hijack the Hispaniola on behalf of his own band of pirates, whom make up the ship's crew. Long John plans to stage a mutiny upon arriving at Skeleton Island, and to kill the captain, Hawkins and Dr. Livesey so that all of the treasure will belong to the pirates. However, Hawkins is discovered, along with Anne Bonny, who had followed Jim from the inn, and gives him protection from Long John.

On reaching Skeleton Island, the Hispanola is hijacked by Silver, with Smollette, Livesey and an American government official on the voyage kept prisoner on the ship whilst the others go ashore. With the help of marooned mariner Ben Gunn, Jim and Anne Bonney escape, and race to beat Long John and the pirates to the treasure. Jim engages in a sword duel with Long John, who is killed by Hawkins.

== Cast ==
- Lance Henriksen as John "Long John" Silver
- Tom Nagel as Jim Hawkins
- Rebekah Kochan as Anne Bonney
- Rhett Giles as Wilkins
- Jeff Denton as Dr. Livesey
- James Ferris as Captain Smollete
- Derek Osedach as Jack Falcon
- Justin Jones as Billy Bones
- Chriss Anglin as Captain Flint
- Dean N. Arevalo as Squire Trelawney
- Josh Sobotik as Gray
- Andrea Lui as Yeera "Yee" Wung
- Leigh Scott as Ben Gunn
- Jennifer Lee Wiggins as Polly
- Thomas Downey as Andrew Jackson

== Review ==
The Nerd Signal found Pirates of Treasure Island to be a perfect film for fans of the work of The Asylum Studio.

== See also ==
- 30,000 Leagues Under the Sea – Another seafaring film by The Asylum, released in 2007
- Pirates of the Caribbean: Dead Man's Chest – The second film in the Pirates of the Caribbean film series
