= Israel Hands =

18th-century pirate

- Born: unknown
- Died: unknown, possibly 1724 possibly London
- Piratical career
- Nickname: Basilica Hands
- Rank: Captain
- Base of operations: Atlantic; West Indies

Israel Hands, also known as Basilica Hands, was an 18th-century pirate best known for being second in command to Edward Teach (c. 1680 – 22 November 1718), better known as Blackbeard. His name serves as the basis for the name of the villainous sidekick in Robert Louis Stevenson's 1883 novel Treasure Island.

== Biography ==
Hands' first historical mention was in 1718, when Blackbeard gave him command of David Herriot's ship Adventure after Herriot was captured by Teach in March 1718. During the winter of 1717–1718, Blackbeard harassed shipping to and from the port of Veracruz, Mexico, Mexico and traversing the Bay of Honduras. On the 4th or 5th of April 1718, at Turneffe Atoll, Blackbeard captured the ten-gun log-cutting sloop Adventure and forced captain Herriot to join him. Also on board was Edward Robinson, the ship's gunner, who would later be involved in the Battle of Cape Fear River. Blackbeard made Israel Hands captain of the Adventure and began sailing for North Carolina. In June 1718, Teach ran his flagship, the Queen Anne's Revenge, aground at Beaufort Inlet, North Carolina. He requested assistance from Hands with the Adventure in an effort to kedge the Queen Anne's Revenge off the bar. However, the Adventure also grounded and was abandoned. Teach, Hands and Stede Bonnet took approximately half the pirates, marooning the rest, and set sail for Ocracoke.

Captain Charles Johnson wrote that Hands was shot in the knee when Teach fired at another of his crew, missing him but striking Hands. Hands asked Teach for his reasons, whereupon Teach remarked that, "if he did not now and then kill one of them, they would forget who he was," though this story is likely fictional.

On 22 November 1718 Teach was killed by troops dispatched from Virginia and led by Royal Navy lieutenant Robert Maynard. At the time Hands was in Bath, North Carolina, and was unable to escape the roundup of pirates in Bath that followed Blackbeard's death. Following his capture, he and fifteen others were taken to Williamsburg, Virginia, to stand trial. In exchange for a pardon, Hands testified against corrupt North Carolina officials with whom Teach had consorted.

The minutes of the North Carolina Governor's Council for 27 May 1719, state:

Hesikia Hands[,] master of Capt Thaches Sloop Adventure[,] seems to sweare possitively in his Depossition that the sd [said] Thache went from Ocacoch Inlet at his returne into this Country from his last voyage with a present to the sd [said] Tobias Knights house [,] when by the same deposition [Hands] acknowledgth that to be out of the reach of his knoledge[,] he being all the time at the sd [said] Inlet which lyes at above thirty leagues distance from [Knight's] house and further the [said] Tobias Knight doth pray your Honours to observe that the aforsd Hesikias Hands was ... for some time before the giving of the [said] Evidence kept in prison under the Terrors of Death a most severe prosecution....

What happened to Hands after this is not known for certain. However, in Captain Charles Johnson's 1724 A General History of the Pyrates, Hands is said to have died impoverished in London. It's also been suggested that Hands changed his name to "Israel Hynde" and joined Bartholomew Roberts' crew. Johnson writes that Hynde, 30, from Bristol, was hanged on April 3–20, 1722, at Cape Coast Castle.

== In popular culture ==
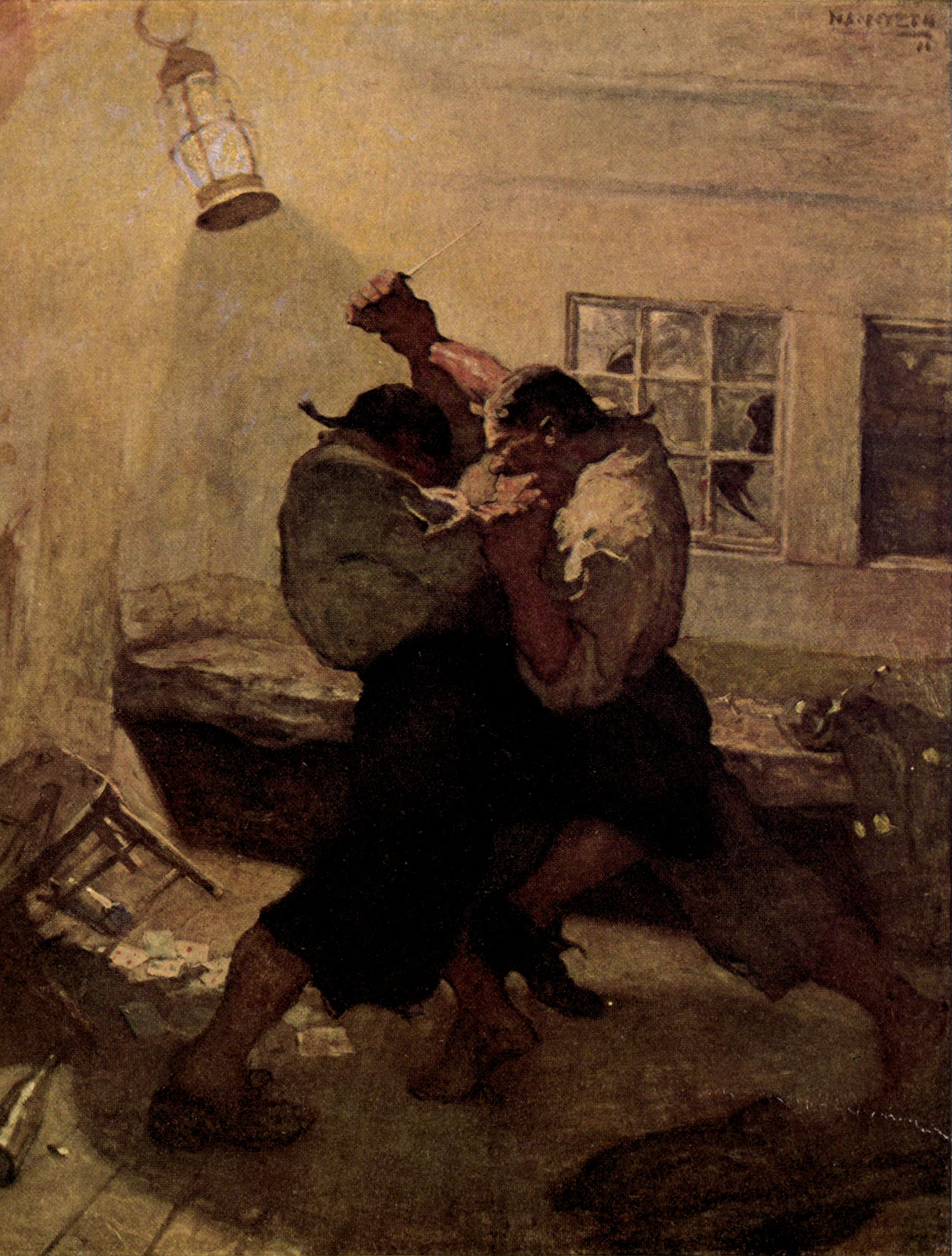
Hands' and O'Brian's drunken fight on the Hispanola

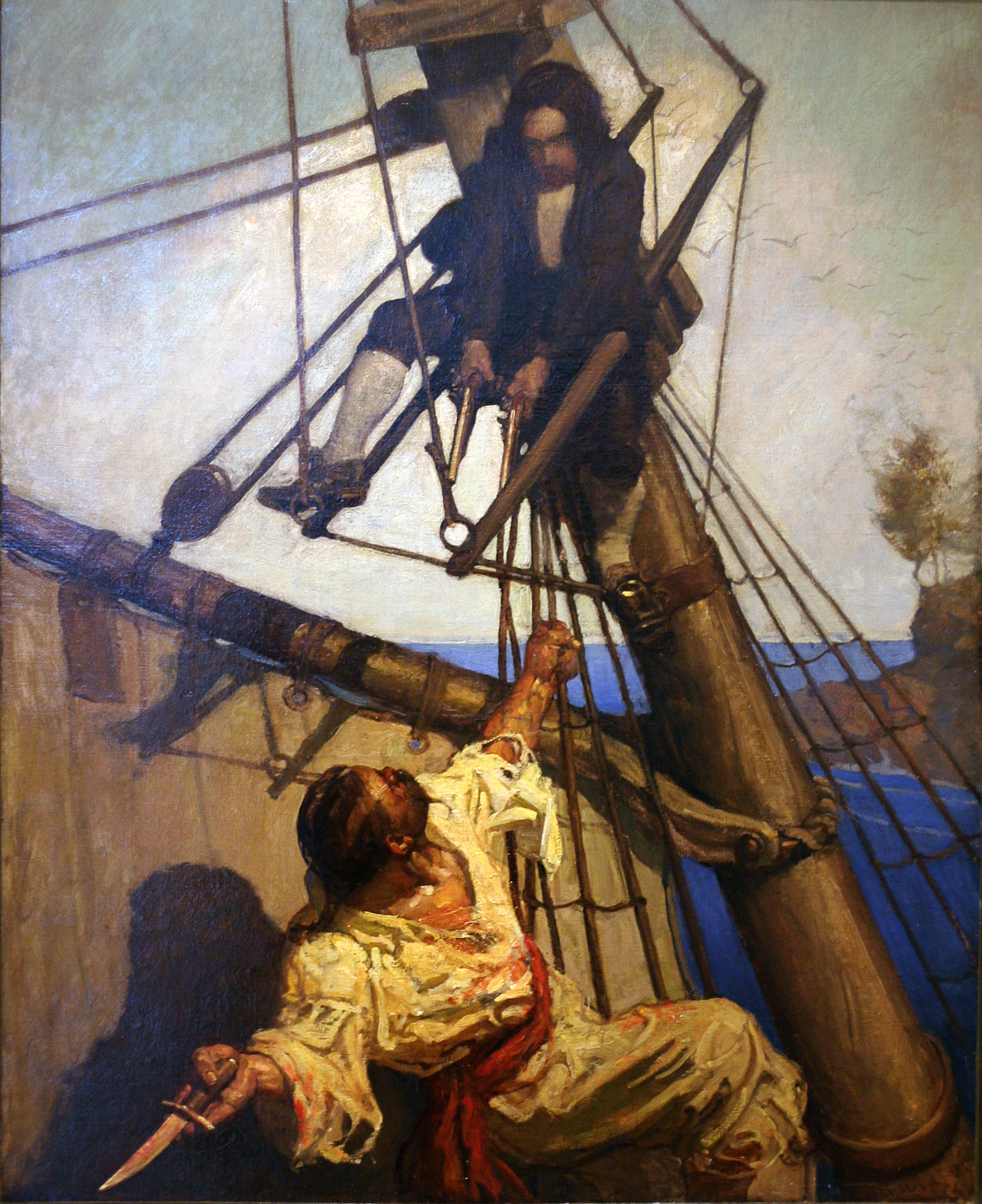
One More Step, Mr. Hands by N.C. Wyeth, 1911, for Treasure Island by Robert Louis Stevenson.

Israel Hands appears as a character in Robert Louis Stevenson's novel Treasure Island and media based on it, in which he is the Hispaniola's coxswain and one of Long John Silver's pirates. He is described as the late Captain Flint's gunner and no mention is made of Blackbeard. Hands engages in a prolonged battle with Jim Hawkins before being shot by the boy.

Hands features in the children's adventure book Kintana and the Captain's Curse by Susan Brownrigg.

Hands appears very briefly in the 2013 video game Assassin's Creed IV: Black Flag, showing a crate of medicine needed for the population of Nassau to Blackbeard, leading him to hold hostages at Charleston.

=== Portrayals in film and television ===
- Mark Noble in the 2006 documentary Blackbeard: Terror at Sea. Hands serves as the narrator.
- Anthony Green in the 2006 television movie Blackbeard. In this version, Hands dies during the battle against Lt. Robert Maynard.
- Irish actor David Wilmot portrays Hands in the fourth season of Starz's Treasure Island prequel series Black Sails.
- Con O'Neill portrays a fictionalized version of Hands in the 2022 romantic comedy series Our Flag Means Death, in which he is referred to by the moniker "Izzy".
- As an Undead Revenant in Kraken Express's Pirate Sandbox Windrose as the Second Boss.

==== Based on Treasure Island ====
- Joseph Singleton in the 1920 silent version.
- Douglass Dumbrille in the 1934 version.
- Geoffrey Keen in the 1950 version and Rod Taylor in its 1954 sequel film, Long John Silver. Though believed to have been killed in the first film, a return expedition to Treasure Island finds Israel Hands alive.
- Aldo Sambrell in the 1972 version.
- Patrick Troughton in the 1977 version.
- Gennadi Yukhtin in the 1982 film.
- Jean-François Stévenin in the 1985 version.
- Michael Halsey in the 1990 version.
- Dermot Keaney in the 1999 version.
- In Disney's 2002 animated movie Treasure Planet, Hands appears as a giant four-armed pirate voiced by Mike McShane. He is a minor character, while another pirate named Scroop (voiced by Michael Wincott) fills the role of directly threatening Jim. Hands and several others fall to their death after Dr. Doppler intentionally breaks the platform they are standing on. Scroop is later kicked into space by Jim when B.E.N. disables the ship's artificial gravity.
- Geoff Bell in the 2012 version.
- Angelo De Castro in the 2015 National Theatre production of the play by Briony Lavery
