= John Silver (cigarette) =

Swedish cigarette brand

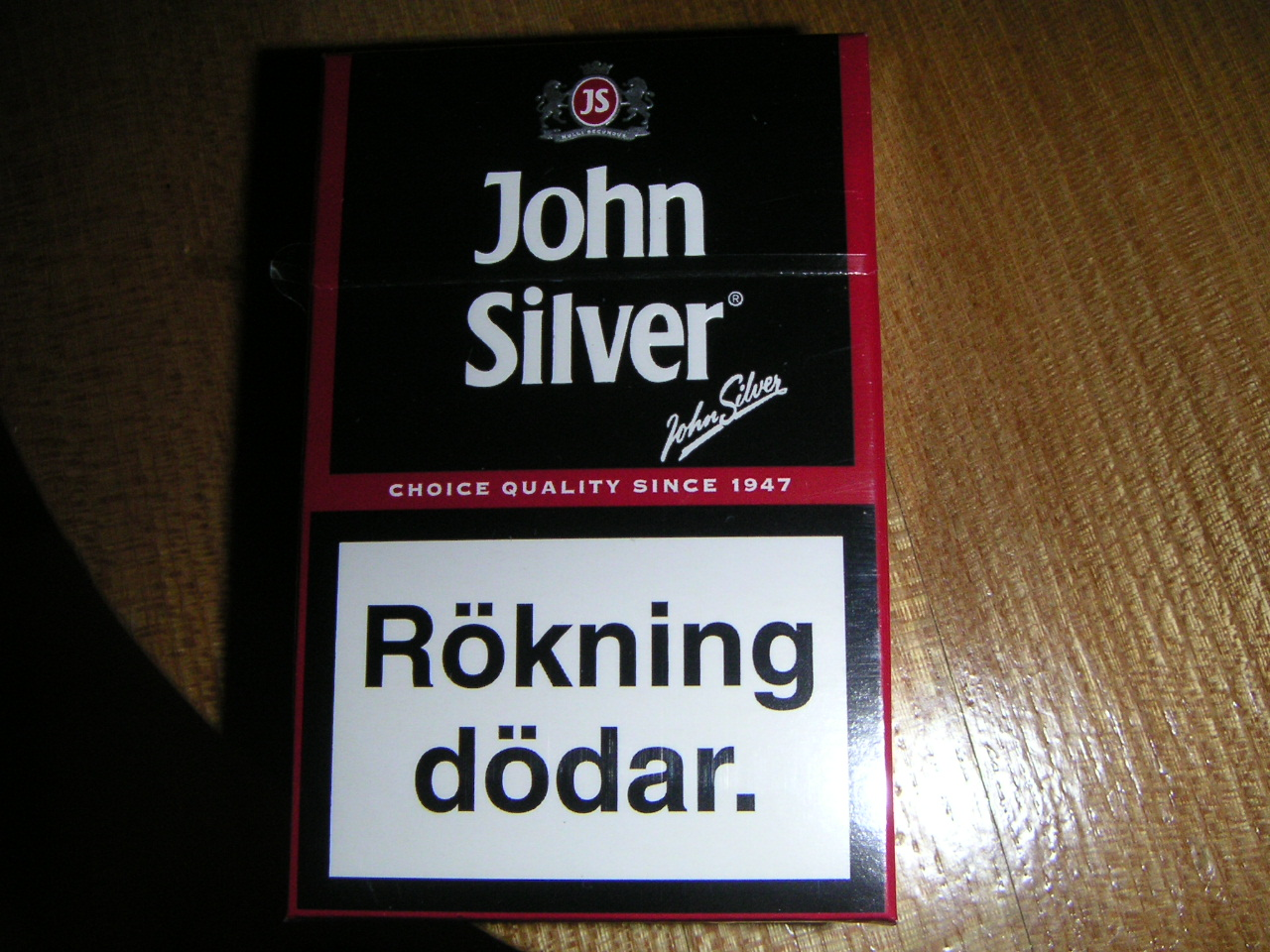
- An old Swedish pack of John Silver cigarettes, with a Swedish text warning at the bottom of the pack.
- Product type: Cigarette
- Produced by: JTI Sweden, a subsidiary of Japan Tobacco
- Country: Sweden
- Introduced: 1947; 79 years ago
- Discontinued: 1948, re-introduced in 1952
- Markets: See Markets
- Previous owners: Tobaksmonopolet, Svenska Tobaks AB, Austria Tabak GmbH

John Silver is a Swedish brand of cigarettes, which was owned and manufactured by Tobaksmonopolet (later called Svenska Tobaks AB). Today, JTI Sweden manufactures the brand, which is a subsidiary of Japan Tobacco.

== History ==
John Silver was launched in 1947 as a filterless cigarette of the American type in order to compete with American brands that became popular after World War II. It was the first "American blend cigarette" produced by a Swedish tobacco company. The mixture was produced by William C. Bethea who was hired by Tobaksmonopolet in 1947.

The cigarette was named in an internal name contest, held by Svenska Tobaks, and was given the name of the fictional pirate Long John Silver from the book Treasure Island. After one year the brand was discontinued because of delivery problems of the tobacco but it was re-released in 1952. In 1958 it became the largest domestic cigarette on the Swedish market. A filtered variant of John Silver was introduced in 1966, and in 1978 a roll tobacco variant was launched. John Silver is available in soft pack and hard pack (flip-top box), both as normal and Duty Free variants. The tobacco mixture consists of Virginia and Burley type tobaccos.

In 1999, Swedish Match sold the brand to "Austria Tabak". Following further acquisitions in the tobacco industry, since 2007, the Japanese counterpart Japan Tobacco and their Swedish subsidiary JTI Sweden own the tobacco brand.

== Markets ==
John Silver is mainly sold in Sweden, but also was or still is sold in Germany, Austria and Spain.

== See also ==
- Cigarette
- Tobacco smoking
