= Billy Bones =

Fictional character in the 1883 novel Treasure Island

- Treasure Island character
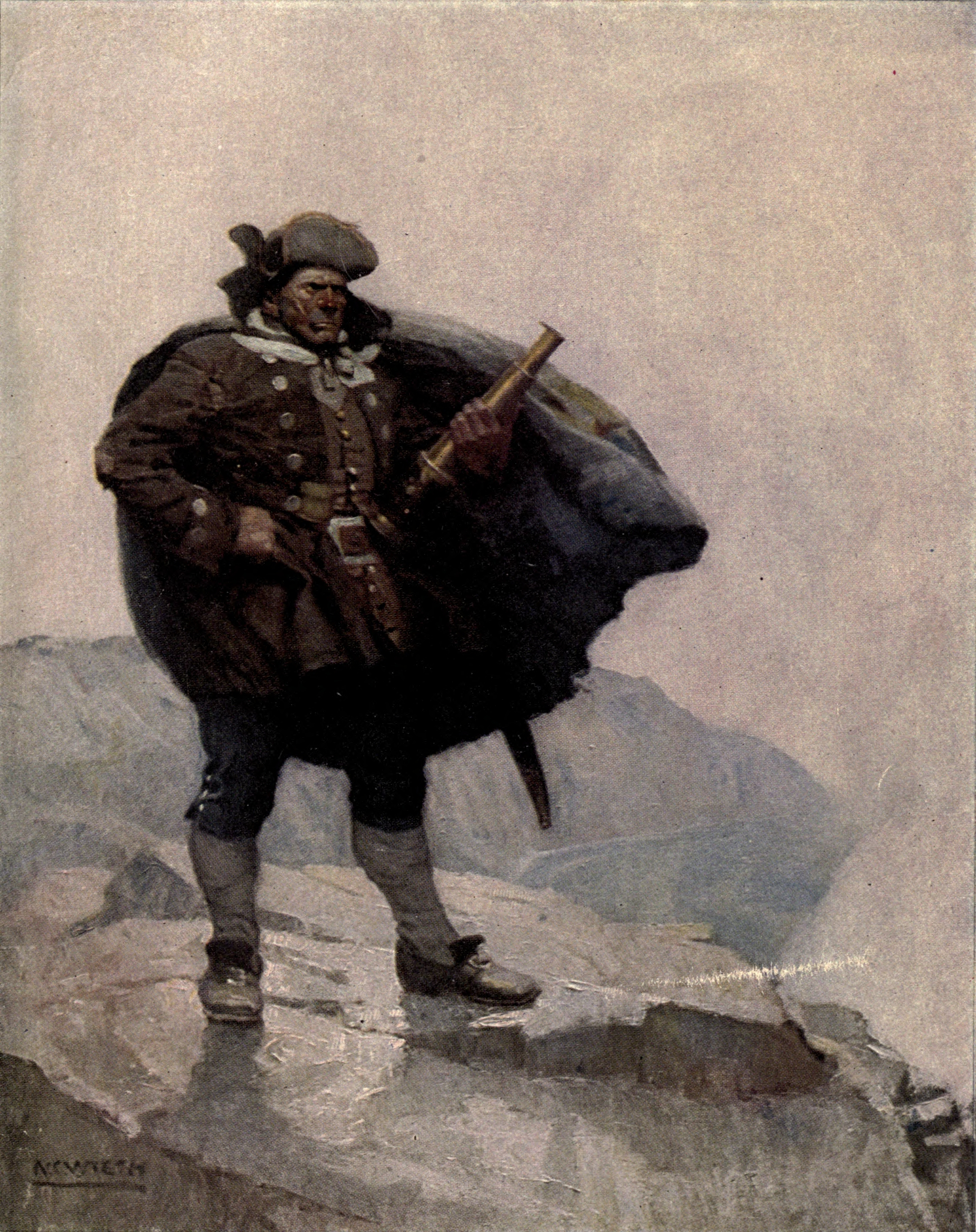
- Illustration by N. C. Wyeth for 1911 edition.
- First appearance: Treasure Island; 1883
- Created by: Robert Louis Stevenson
- Portrayed by: Herschell Mayall (1918); Lionel Barrymore (1934); Finlay Currie (1950); Dante Maggio (1966); Lionel Stander (1972); Jack Watson (1977); Leonid Markov (1982); Martin Landau (1986); Ernest Borgnine (1987); Oliver Reed (1990); Michael Elphick (1995); Billy Connolly (1996); Patrick Bergin (1999); Justin Jones (2006); Tom Hopper (2014–2017)
- Voiced by: Ryo Kurosawa (1978); Takeshi Aono (1987); Viktor Andriyenko (1988); Patrick McGoohan (2002)

In-universe information
- Nickname: Bill
- Species: Human
- Gender: Male
- Occupation: Pirate
- Nationality: English

Billy Bones is a fictional character appearing in the first section of Robert Louis Stevenson's 1883 novel Treasure Island.

Among other things, he is notable for singing the "Dead Man's Chest" sea song.

== In the novel ==
Billy Bones appears at the very outset of the story with a mysterious sea chest, looking for a wayside inn with a view of the sea. Bones decides upon the Admiral Benbow Inn where he asks to be addressed merely as "Captain". Though his down-payment for lodgings is adequate, even generous, he stays for many months and browbeats Jim Hawkins' father out of asking for more money even when his deposit has been spent. He does, however, pay Jim fourpence a month to keep watch for "a seafaring man with one leg". Though he seems sometimes on the verge of deciding this was a waste of money, he invariably relents. Most of the daytime is spent walking the cliffs and looking out to sea.

A heavily addicted alcoholic, the Captain terrorizes the customers of the Benbow with his swearing, singing and general bullying. Yet he begins to attract customers by his very notoriety, and earns some admiration from locals who consider him a "real old salt". The one person in town the Captain cannot bully is Dr. Livesey, who is also a magistrate. The winter after his arrival, the Captain is visited by Black Dog, a villainous-looking man with two fingers missing from his hand. There is a noisy argument between the two, which turns into a lively sword fight and the Captain drives off a wounded Black Dog. As soon as the unwelcome visitor is gone, the Captain suffers a stroke. He is tended to by Dr. Livesey, who discovers the real name of the Captain to be Billy Bones when his arm is bared as a prelude to a surgical bloodletting and the name is found tattooed there.

The doctor saves Bones' life and tells him to lay off the alcohol, but Bones is unable to heed Livesey's warning. He is plainly weakened by his stroke and the shock of Black Dog's visit, and at one point Hawkins even hears him sing a country love song, a gentle relic of his innocent days as a youth. He admits to Jim Hawkins that he sailed with Captain Flint, the notorious pirate, and was first mate on his ship. This explains much of the mysterious circumstances and solitary behavior of the early part of the story.

A few days later, a blind pirate known only as Pew reaches the inn, and Bones is plainly terrified. Pew slips a Black Spot into Bones' hand and departs. Bones suffers a second stroke and dies. The pirates come nonetheless and ransack the inn. The attackers fail to find the map, as it is now in Hawkins' possession, but they destroy the inn, ruining the Hawkinses' livelihood. This prompts Hawkins and his companions to embark on a search for the treasure.

== Fictional biography ==
Bones' account book, read by Jim Hawkins and Dr. Livesey, says that Bones was a pirate for nearly 20 years.

According to the map notes of Treasure Island, Captain Flint hid his treasure in August 1750 and Bones received the Map in July 1754.

According to Long John Silver's conversation with Dick Johnson, Blind Pew spent his share of treasure in one year and that for two years until his accidental death under the Revenue Officer's horse, he was starving and murdering—thus a tentative date for Treasure Island is 1756–1757.

== Other media ==
- Herschell Mayall plays Captain Bill Bones in the prologue to the 1918 silent film Treasure Island.
- He is portrayed by Lionel Barrymore in the 1934 film adaptation of Treasure Island.
- Billy Bones is referenced in the Lost in Space episode "Treasure of the Lost Planet" (1967), where he is referred to as "Beelibones".
- In the 1971 anime film Animal Treasure Island (Dōbutsu Takarajima), Billy Bones is portrayed as a one-legged, anthropomorphic cat on the run from the ruling council of Pirate Island because of his possession of Flint's map. He is later killed off-screen by a band of pirate assassins soon after entrusting the map to Jim.
- Lionel Stander plays the character in Treasure Island (1972).
- Billy Bones is mentioned in the 1974 song "The Tomahawk Kid" by The Sensational Alex Harvey Band for their album The Impossible Dream.
- He is the subject of the song "Billy Bones and the White Bird" (written by Bernie Taupin) on Elton John's 1975 Rock of the Westies album.
- The character is portrayed by Leonid Markov in the 1982 Soviet film Treasure Island (Oстpoв сoкpoвищ).
- In Treasure Island (1986), the character is simply known as "Old Captain" and is played by Martin Landau.
- Viktor Andriyenko voices the character in the Soviet animated film Treasure Island (1988).
- Oliver Reed plays the character in Treasure Island (1990).
- Billy Bones is portrayed by Billy Connolly in Muppet Treasure Island (1996).
- Patrick Bergin plays the character in Treasure Island (1999)
- Billy Bones appears briefly in Disney's animated film Treasure Planet (2002), voiced by Patrick McGoohan. This version is a reptilian alien and pilot who crash-lands near Jim's home while fleeing from pirates. He gives Jim a map and tells him to "beware the cyborg" (Long John Silver) before succumbing to his injuries.
- Billy Bones is mentioned in the 2003 song "Time For Heroes" by the Libertines.
- Billy Bones is portrayed by Tom Hopper in the Starz original series Black Sails (2014–2017). In the episode "VI.", Billy's full name is revealed as William "Bones" Manderly. The episode "XVI." revealed that he was the son of anti-impressment activists in Kensington, and was himself press-ganged while handing out pamphlets on the subject. He was essentially enslaved for three years until Captain Flint freed him, at which point Billy killed his former captor and chose to remain a pirate because he felt he couldn't go home and face his family after doing so.
- Other actors who have portrayed Billy Bones include Ernest Borgnine, Michael Elphick (1995), Finlay Currie, Dante Maggio, Jack Watson, Ryo Kurosawa, Takeshi Aono, and Justin Jones (2006).
- Billy Bones is portrayed by Tomer Capone in Treasure Island (2026), a TV series
