= Jim Hawkins (character) =

Fictional character

- Treasure Island character
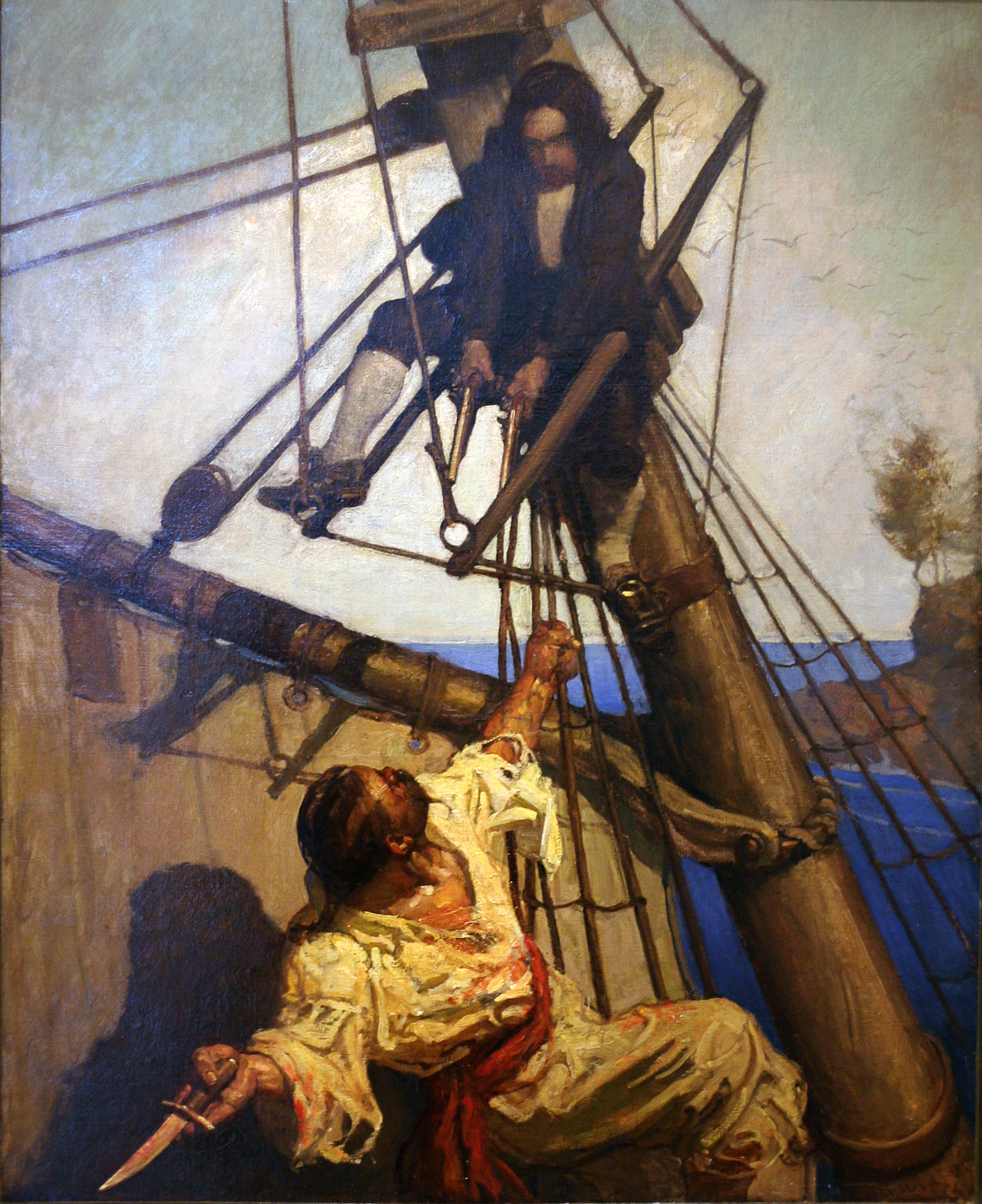
- One More Step, Mr. Hands by N. C. Wyeth, 1911, for Treasure Island by Robert Louis Stevenson (Jim Hawkins with pistols).
- Created by: Robert Louis Stevenson

In-universe information
- Species: Human
- Gender: Male
- Occupation: Cabin boy, son of an innkeeper
- Nationality: English

James Hawkins is a fictional character and the protagonist in Robert Louis Stevenson's 1883 novel Treasure Island. He is both the protagonist and the main narrator of the story.

== Appearances ==
At the start of the novel, Jim works at his family's inn. A patron of the inn, former swashbuckler Billy Bones, receives the Black Spot, a pirates' summons, with the warning that he has until ten o'clock, and he drops dead of apoplexy on the spot. In the dead man's sea chest, Jim and his mother find an oilskin packet, which contains a logbook detailing the treasure looted during Captain Flint's career, and a detailed map of an island, with the location of Flint's treasure caches marked on it. Squire Trelawney immediately plans to outfit a sailing vessel to hunt the treasure down, with the help of Dr. Livesey and Jim.

When Jim goes to Bristol and visits Long John Silver at the Spy Glass tavern, his suspicions are immediately aroused: Silver is missing a leg, like the man Bones warned him about. But Silver manages to win Jim's trust. Despite Captain Smollett's misgivings about the mission and Silver's hand-picked crew, the Hispaniola sets sail for the Caribbean Sea. As they near their destination, Jim crawls into the ship's apple barrel to get some apples. While inside, he overhears Silver talking secretly with some of the other crewmen. Silver admits that he was Captain Flint's quartermaster and that several of the other crew were also once Flint's men, and he is recruiting more men from the crew to his own side. After Flint's treasure is recovered, Silver intends to murder the Hispaniola's officers and keep the loot for himself and his men. Once the pirates return to their berths, Jim warns Smollett, Trelawney, and Livesey of the impending mutiny.

When they reach the island, the bulk of Silver's men go ashore immediately. Although Jim is not yet aware of this, Silver's men have given Silver the Black Spot and demanded to seize the treasure immediately, discarding Silver's own more careful plan to postpone any open mutiny or violence until after the treasure is safely aboard. Jim lands with Silver's men but runs away from them almost as soon as he is ashore. Hiding in the woods, Jim sees Silver murder Tom, a crewman loyal to Smollett. Running for his life, he encounters Ben Gunn, another ex-crewman of Flint's who has been marooned three years on the island but who treats Jim kindly in return for a chance to return to civilization. Later, Jim joins Trelawney, Livesey, and their men at an abandoned, fortified stockade on the island. Silver and his pirates assault the stockade but are repulsed in a furious battle.

Under cover of darkness, Jim sneaks out of the stockade, takes Ben Gunn's coracle, and approaches the Hispaniola. He cuts the ship's anchor cable, setting her adrift and out of reach of the pirates on shore. After daybreak, he manages to approach the schooner again and board her. Of the two pirates left aboard, only one is still alive: the coxswain, Israel Hands, who agrees to help Jim helm the ship to a safe beach in exchange for medical treatment and brandy. Once the ship approaches the beach, however, Hands attempts to murder Jim, who shoots him in self defense.

The following day, the treasure is gone and the enraged pirates turn on Silver and Jim, but Ben Gunn, Dr. Livesey, and his men ambush the pirates, killing two and dispersing the rest. Silver surrenders to Dr. Livesey, promising to return to duty. They go to Ben Gunn's cave home, where Gunn has hidden the treasure for some months. The treasure is divided. One night Silver abandons the ship with some bags of gold. Jim says that he still has nightmares in which he can hear Silver's parrot screaming, "Pieces of eight!"

== Adaptations ==
Among the actors who played Jim Hawkins in each adaptation of Treasure Island are:

Film
Version	Actor
1918 film	Francis Carpenter
1920 film	Shirley Mason
1934 film	Jackie Cooper
1937 film	Claudia Pugacheva (as Jenny Hawkins)
1950 film	Bobby Driscoll
Long John Silver	Kit Taylor
1954 film	Dawn Addams (as Jamie Hawkins)
1971 film	Aare Laanemets
1971 film featuring the characters as animals	Minori Matsushima (voice); Billie Lou Watt (voice, English dub)
1972 film	Kim Burfield
1972 animated film	Davy Jones
1982 film	Fyodor Stukov
1985 film	Melvil Poupaud
1987 film	Todd Boyce (voice)
1987 compilation film of the 1978 TV series	Masako Nozawa (voice, child); Kenyuu Horiuchi (voice, adult); Erica Mendez (voice, child, English dub); Johnny Yong Bosch (voice, adult, English dub)
1988 film	Valeriy Bessarab (voice) and Jan Rabson (voice) (English Dub)
1990 film	Christian Bale
1996 Muppets film	Kevin Bishop
1999 film	Kevin Zegers
Treasure Planet	Joseph Gordon-Levitt (voice); Austin Majors (voice, young)
2006 film	Tom Nagel

Television
Version	Actor
1954 TV series	Kit Taylor
Die Schatzinsel	Michael Ande
1968 TV series	Michael Newport
1977 miniseries	Ashley Knight
1978–79 TV series	Mari Shimizu (voice, child); Kiyotaka Mitsugi (voice, adult); Koichi Yamadera (voice, adult, 1992 OVA)
1986 TV series	Christopher Guard
1987 TV series set in space	Itaco Nardulli (as Gimmi Hawkins)
1993–95 TV series	Dawn French (voice, season 1); John Hasler (voice, season 2)
2012 miniseries	Toby Regbo

Radio
Year	Program	Voice actor
1938	Mercury Theater on the Air	Orson Welles/Arthur Anderson
1951	Lux Radio Theater	Bobby Driscoll
1989	BBC Radio 4	Ben Rodska
1995	BBC Radio 4	James MacPherson
2013	Big Finish Productions	Edward Holtom

=== Treasure Planet version ===
Jim Hawkins
- John Silver (left) with Jim Hawkins (right) as depicted in Disney's Treasure Planet
- First appearance: Treasure Planet (2002)
- Created by: John Ripa
- Voiced by: Joseph Gordon-Levitt (teen); Austin Majors (child)

Jim Hawkins appears in Disney's 2002 animated film, Treasure Planet, a science fiction adaptation of Treasure Island, where his full name is referred to as James Pleiades Hawkins. The film's prologue depicts Jim as a toddler (voiced by Austin Majors) reading a storybook in bed. Jim is enchanted by stories of the legendary pirate Captain Flint and his ability to appear from nowhere, raid passing ships, and disappear in order to hide the loot on the mysterious "Treasure Planet". Twelve years later, Jim (now voiced by Joseph Gordon-Levitt) has grown into an aloof and alienated teenager, after his father abandoned him, helping his mother Sarah run an inn and deriving amusement from "solar surfing" (a hybrid of skysurfing and windsurfing atop a board attached to a solar-powered rocket), a pastime that frequently gets him in trouble with the police. One day, a spaceship crashes near the inn. The dying pilot, Billy Bones, gives Jim a sphere and tells him to "beware the cyborg". A gang of pirates raid and burn the inn as Jim, his mother, and their dog-themed friend Dr. Delbert Doppler barely escape. The sphere turns out to be a holographic projector, showing a map that Jim realizes leads to Treasure Planet.

Doppler commissions a ship called RLS Legacy on a mission to find Treasure Planet. The crew is a motley bunch, secretly led by cook John Silver, who Jim suspects is the cyborg of whom he was warned. Jim is sent down to work in the galley; despite his mistrust of Silver, they soon form a tenuous father-son relationship. As the ship reaches Treasure Planet, mutiny erupts, led by Silver. Jim, Doppler, and Amelia abandon the ship, accidentally leaving the map behind. Silver, who believes that Jim has the map, has a chance to kill Jim, but refuses to do so because of his attachment to the boy. While exploring Treasure Planet's forests, the fugitives meet B.E.N., an abandoned, whimsical robot who claims to have lost most of his memory and invites them to his house to care for the wounded Amelia. The pirates corner the group here; using a back-door, Jim and B.E.N. return to the ship to recover the map. Upon their return, they are captured by Silver, who has already captured Doppler and Amelia.

When Jim is forced to use the map, the group finds their way to a portal that can be opened to any place in the universe. The treasure is at the center of the planet, accessible only via the portal. In the stash of treasure, Jim comes across a missing part of B.E.N.'s cognitive computer. Jim replaces this piece, causing B.E.N. to remember that the planet is starting to collapse, after he re-inserts the memory circuit to B.E.N.'s head upon Flint's discovery of treasure. In the ensuing catastrophe, Silver finds himself torn between holding onto a literal boat-load of gold and saving Jim, who hangs from a precipice after a fall. Silver saves Jim, instead of treasure, and the group escapes to the Legacy, which is damaged and lacks the motive power required to leave the planet in time to escape. Jim attaches a rocket to a narrow plate of metal and rides it toward the portal to open it to a new location while Doppler pilots the ship behind him. Jim manages to open the portal to his home world's spaceport, through which all escape Treasure Planet's destruction.

With the surviving pirates imprisoned aboard the ship, Amelia offers to recommend Jim to the Interstellar Academy for his heroic actions. Silver sneaks below deck, where Jim finds him preparing his escape. Jim happily lets him go, inheriting Silver's shape-changing pet called Morph. Silver predicts that Jim will "rattle the stars", then tosses him a handful of jewels and gold he had taken from Treasure Planet, before its destruction, to pay for rebuilding the inn. During the film's epilogue, a party at the rebuilt inn shows Jim in the uniform of a military cadet, having changed his ways and being escorted home by two cop robots that arrested him before: the change is evident as the cops greet him with respect unlike before. He looks to the skies and sees an image of Silver in the clouds.

This version of Jim appears in the video game Treasure Planet: Battle at Procyon and other video games based on the film. In 2024, Jim appears in the trading card game Disney Lorcana.
