= Squire Trelawney =

- Treasure Island character
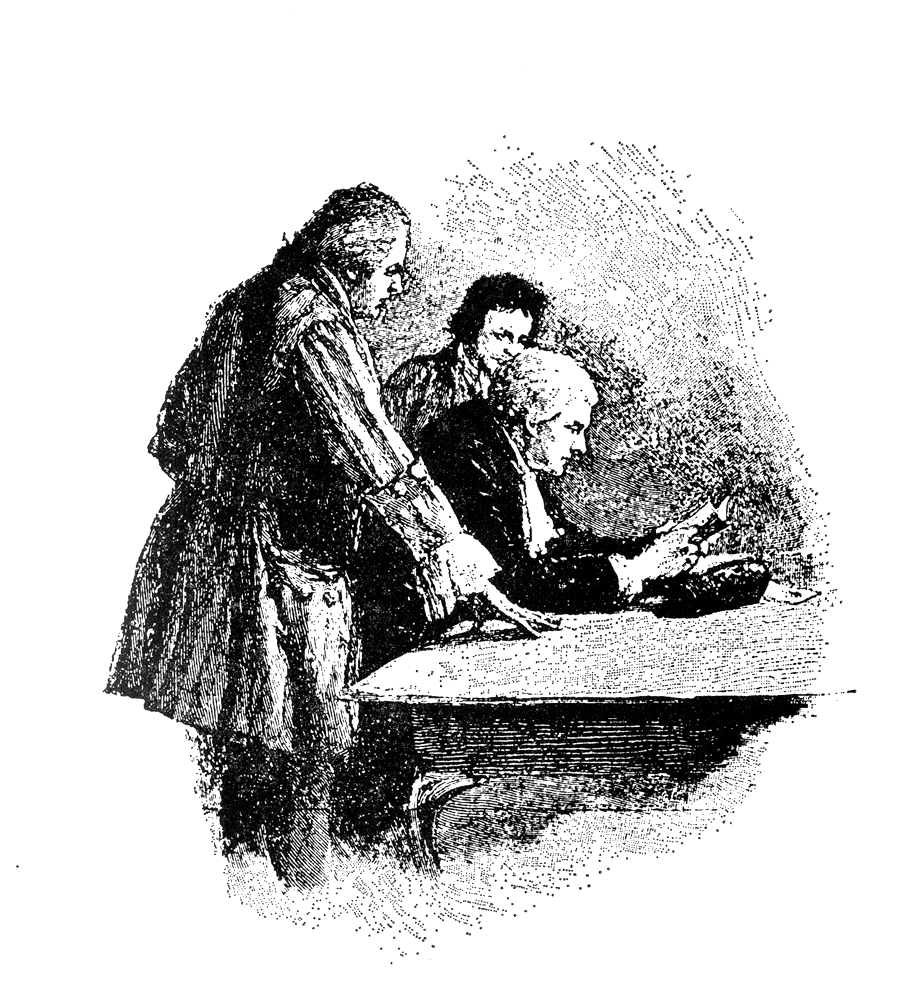
- Created by: Robert Louis Stevenson

In-universe information
- Species: Human
- Gender: Male
- Nationality: English

Squire John Trelawney is a supporting character from Robert Louis Stevenson's 1883 novel Treasure Island.

== Character overview ==
Stevenson describes him as "a tall man, over six feet high, and broad in proportion, and he had a bluff, rough-and-ready face, all roughened and reddened and lined in his long travels. His eyebrows were very black and moved readily, and this gave him a look of some temper, not bad, you would say, but quick and high."

The Squire is a bombastic and excitable landowner and friend to Dr. Livesey, another supporting character who has been sought out by the book's protagonist, Jim Hawkins, as a sanctuary from pirates who seek the treasure map that has fallen into Jim's possession. He is somewhat gullible, being persuaded by the cunning Long John Silver into hiring a crew of mutinous pirates, and argues with Captain Alexander Smollett about the latter's "unmanly, unsailorly, and downright un-English" doubts about the safety of the cruise. However, when Jim discovers the planned mutiny, Trelawney humbly admits his error and proves a determined and capable companion, and is grieved when his gamekeeper, Tom Redruth, dies from a gunshot wound.

== Role in plot ==
Squire Trelawney immediately plans to commission a sailing vessel to hunt for the treasure, with the help of Dr. Livesey and Jim. He finances the entire expedition to the eponymous Treasure Island. Going to the Bristol docks, Trelawney buys the schooner Hispaniola, hires Captain Smollett to command her, and retains Long John Silver, a former sea cook and now the owner of the dock-side "Spy-Glass" tavern, to run the galley. When it comes to hiring a crew for the ship, he depends highly on the advice of Silver, who recruits a group of fellow pirates.

Livesey warns Trelawney to be silent about their objective, but he cannot keep a secret and everyone seems to get to know about the nature of the mission. Although the squire is financier of the expedition and appears to be the social better of all others aboard the ship, he is privately dismissed on several occasions due to his lack of discretion. Stevenson has Jim Hawkins observe that neither he nor the captain paid much regard to Mr. Trelawney's protestations. Trelawney is chastened by the revelation that the men Silver gathered are Flint's old crew, plotting to mutiny; he turns to Captain Smollett and says, "Now, Captain, you were right, and I was wrong. I own myself an ass, and I await your orders."

When the crew mutinies to steal the treasure, Trelawney, Livesey, and their loyal crewmen surprise and overpower the few pirates who did not go ashore. They row ashore and move into an abandoned fortified stockade. The pirates are defeated, the treasure is divided amongst Trelawney and his loyal men, and they return to England, leaving the surviving pirates marooned on the island.

The squire is a well-travelled man and the best shot amongst the crew. He also shows effective leadership qualities and keeps a cool head throughout the adventure.

Squire Trelawney may have been named for Edward Trelawny, Governor of Jamaica from 1738 to 1752.

== Film portrayals ==
The character of Squire Trelawney has been played in film adaptations by Sydney Deane (1920), Nigel Bruce (1934), Mikhail Klimov (1938), Walter Fitzgerald (1950), Algimantas Masiulis (1971), Walter Slezak (1972), Thorley Walters (1977), Vladislav Strzhelchik (1982), Borys Voznyuk (1988, voice), Richard Johnson (1990), Fozzie Bear in Muppet Treasure Island (1996), Christopher Benjamin (1999), Dean N. Arevalo (2006), and Rupert Penry-Jones (2012).
