= Long John Silver =

Antagonist of Stevenson's Treasure Island

- Treasure Island character
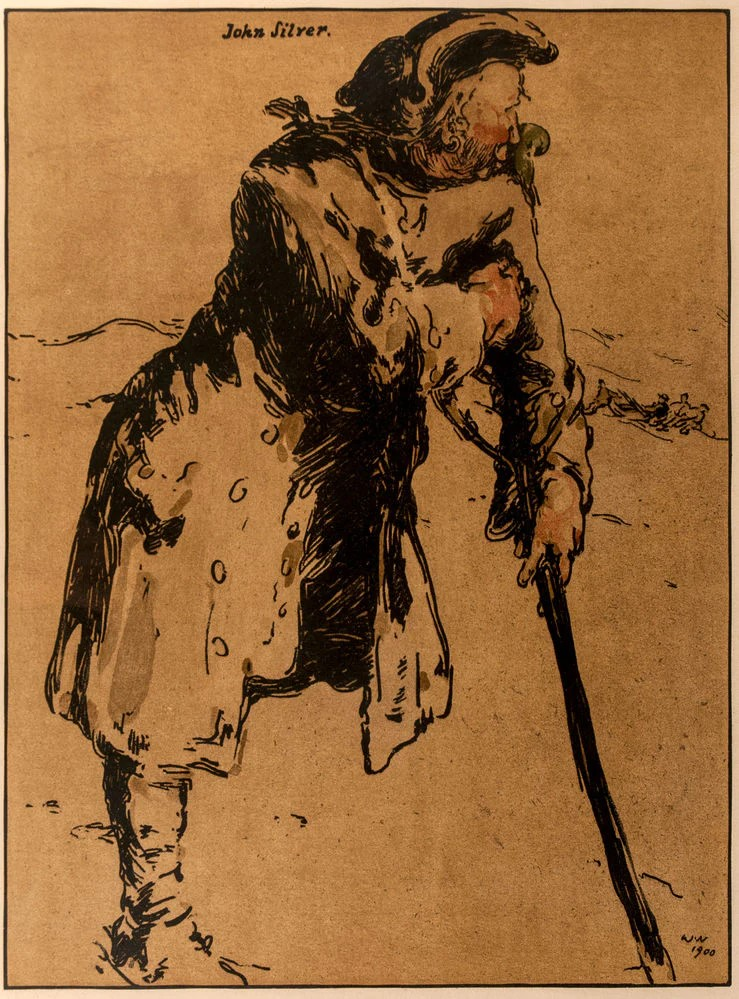
- Long John Silver in Characters of Romance, illustration by William Nicholson
- Created by: Robert Louis Stevenson
- Portrayed by: Robert Newton; Orson Welles; Charlton Heston; Lance Henriksen; Luke Arnold; Tim Curry
- Voiced by: Various Voices

In-universe information
- Nicknames: Chef, Silver, Barbecue, Long John, Jack, Captain
- Gender: Male
- Occupation: Chief cook; Quartermaster; Pirate captain
- Nationality: English

Long John Silver is a fictional character and the main antagonist in the 1883 novel Treasure Island by Robert Louis Stevenson. The most colourful and complex character in the book, he continues to appear in popular culture. His missing leg and parrot, in particular, have greatly contributed to the image of the pirate in popular culture.

== Profile ==
Long John Silver is a cunning and opportunistic pirate who was quartermaster under the notorious Captain Flint. Stevenson's portrayal of Silver has greatly influenced the modern iconography of the pirate.

Long John Silver has a parrot, named Captain Flint in honor—or mockery—of his former captain, who generally perches on Silver's shoulder, and is known to chatter pirate or seafaring phrases like "Pieces of Eight", and "Stand by to go about". Silver uses the parrot as another means of gaining Jim's trust, by telling the boy all manner of exciting stories about the parrot's buccaneer history. "'Now that bird', Silver would say, 'is, maybe, two hundred years old, Hawkins—they lives forever mostly, and if anybody's seen more wickedness it must be the devil himself. She's sailed with England—the great pirate Cap'n England. She's been at Madagascar, and at Malabar, and Surinam, and Providence, and Portobello... She was at the boarding of the Viceroy of the Indies out of Goa, she was, and to look at her you would think she was a baby'."

Silver claims to have served in the Royal Navy and lost his leg under "the immortal Hawke". "His left leg was cut off close by the hip, and under the left shoulder, he carried a crutch, which he managed with wonderful dexterity, hopping about upon it like a bird. He was very tall and strong, with a face as big as a ham—plain and pale, but intelligent and smiling."

He claims to have been the only man whom Flint ever feared. Although treacherous and willing to change sides at any time to further his own interests, Silver has compensating virtues. He is wise enough to save his money, in contrast to the spendthrift ways of most of the pirates. He speaks very persuasively, and is physically courageous despite his disability: for instance, when Flint's cache is found to be empty, he coolly stands his ground against five murderous seamen despite having only Jim, a boy in his teens, to back him.

According to Stevenson's letters, the idea for the character of Long John Silver was in part inspired by his real-life friend William Henley, a writer and editor. Stevenson's stepson, Lloyd Osbourne, described Henley as "...a great, glowing, massive-shouldered fellow with a big red beard and a crutch; jovial, astoundingly clever, and with a laugh that rolled like music; he had an unimaginable fire and vitality; he swept one off one's feet". In a letter to Henley after the publication of Treasure Island, Stevenson wrote: "I will now make a confession. It was the sight of your maimed strength and masterfulness that begot Long John Silver...the idea of the maimed man, ruling and dreaded by the sound, was entirely taken from you".

== Adaptations and related works ==
=== Literature ===
- A prequel novel to Treasure Island, titled Porto Bello Gold, was published in 1924 by Arthur D. Howden Smith.
- British historian Dennis Judd presents Silver as the main character in his 1977 prequel, The Adventures of Long John Silver, and in the 1979 sequel, Return to Treasure Island.
- John Silver is also the protagonist in Björn Larsson's fictional 1995 autobiography, Long John Silver: The True and Eventful History of My Life of Liberty and Adventure as a Gentleman of Fortune and Enemy to Mankind, published in Sweden in 1995.
- Silver is the main character in Edward Chupack's 2008 Silver — My Own Tale as Told by Me with a Goodly Amount of Murder.
- Silver is a minor character in Andrew Motion's 2012 novel Silver: Return to Treasure Island, a sequel to the original book. Set many years after the end of the original, Silver is now half mad and blind, living in the company of his wife and daughter.
- In the Stephen King novel Firestarter, the main protagonist's father Andy McGee receives a psychic warning that his daughter has been deceived by a lead antagonist, the scarred assassin Rainbird, in the form of a vision of Silver.

=== Audio-radio ===
- Orson Welles played Silver in a broadcast on 18 July 1938 of The Mercury Theatre on the Air.
- Basil Rathbone starred as both The Narrator and Silver in a 1944 audio recording for Columbia Masterworks Records.
- William Redfield played Silver on the 14 May 1948 Your Playhouse of Favorites adaptation.
- Ronald Colman hosted an adaptation of the novel on the 27 April 1948 broadcast of Favorite Story.
- James Mason played Silver opposite Bobby Driscoll's "Jim Hawkins" on the Lux Radio Theatre's adaptation on 29 January 1951.
- James Kennedy played Silver in the Tale Spinners for Children audio adaptation of Treasure Island (United Artists Records, UAC 11013).
- There have been two BBC Radio adaptations of Treasure Island, with Silver being played by Peter Jeffrey in 1989, and Jack Shepherd in 1995.
- The author John le Carré performed an abridged reading of the novel in five parts as part of BBC Radio 4's Afternoon Reading.
- Tom Baker starred as Silver in Big Finish Productions' 2012 audio adaptation.

=== Theatre ===
There have been several major stage adaptations made.

- Starting in 1966, in London, there was an annual production of the musical Treasure Island, based on a book by Bernard Miles and Josephine Wilson. The music was composed by Cyril Ornadel and the lyrics by Hal Shaper. The musical was performed at the Mermaid Theatre, originally under the direction of Bernard Miles, who played Long John Silver, a part he also played in various television versions. Comedian Spike Milligan would often play Ben Gunn in these productions, and in 1981, Tom Baker played Long John Silver.
- Pieces of Eight, a musical adaptation by Jule Styne, premiered in Edmonton, Alberta, in 1985.
- In 2011, Tom Hewitt starred in B. H. Barry and Vernon Morris's stage adaptation of the novel, which officially opened 5 March at the Irondale Center in Brooklyn.
- In 2013, YouthPlays published Long Joan Silver by Arthur M. Jolly, an adaptation where all of the pirates are women.
- From December 2014 to April 2015, Arthur Darvill played Silver in the National Theatre production of Treasure Island adapted by Bryony Lavery and directed by Polly Findlay.

=== Film ===
Orson Welles as Silver in the 1972 live-action film version of Treasure Island.

- Charles Ogle played Silver in the 1920 silent film.
- Wallace Beery was the first speaking Long John Silver in the 1934 film also starring Lionel Barrymore.
- Robert Newton became an iconic Long John Silver in Disney's 1950 live-action film.
- The 1954 film, Long John Silver, again starred Robert Newton as the title character, which he would reprise in television (see below).
- The 1971 anime film depicts Silver as an anthropomorphic pig who captains his own pirate ship, sporting a hook prosthesis on his left hand rather than a missing leg.
- Orson Welles portrayed Silver in the 1972 live action film adaptation.
- In the 1988 Soviet animated film adaptation, Armen Dzhigarkhanyan provided the voice talent for John Silver.
- Charlton Heston portrays Long John Silver in the 1990 made-for-television movie, Treasure Island. This version of the story is noted for its faithfulness to the book, with much of the dialogue coming directly from it, as well as recreating several of the more violent scenes from the book.
- In the 1994 movie The Pagemaster, the character of Silver is voiced by Jim Cummings.
- Tim Curry portrays Long John Silver in Disney's 1996 Muppets musical film adaptation. This version has Bad Polly Lobster as his pet instead of a parrot. At the end of the film, Long John Silver left in a rowboat that was deemed unsafe and ended up swimming back to Treasure Island while Bad Polly Lobster was among the followers that were detained.
- Jack Palance, in one of his last film appearances, portrays Silver in the 1999 film.

John Silver (left) is portrayed as a cyborg in Disney's Treasure Planet.

- Silver is voiced by Brian Murray and depicted as an extraterrestrial cyborg in the Disney 2002 animated science fiction adventure film Treasure Planet.
  - One thing screenwriters Ted Elliott and Terry Rossio took from their experience on Treasure Planet, was the simple premise of, "Is Long John Silver a delightful Falstaffian character or a contemptible villain?" That idea was something they carried into Captain Jack Sparrow. Both Jack Sparrow and Hector Barbossa are based on Robert Newton's portrayal of Long John Silver. In an article, The Guardian noted that "Nowadays all pirates (though not Somali pirates, interestingly) are in some sense a version of Long John Silver, even when they have got two legs – think of Captain Jack Sparrow."
- Lance Henriksen played Silver in the 2006 film Pirates of Treasure Island.
- Tobias Moretti played Silver in the 2007 German film adaptation of Treasure Island, entitled Die Schatzinsel.
- In the film Solo: A Star Wars Story (2018), the character of Tobias Beckett (played by Woody Harrelson) was inspired by Long John Silver.

=== Television ===
- Robert Newton followed up his two feature films with a 1955 Australian-produced television series The Adventures of Long John Silver.
- Peter Wyngarde played Silver in the 1958 TV series The Adventures of Ben Gunn.
- BBC Television has presented the story in serial format four times, with the role of Silver being played by Bernard Miles in 1951 and again in 1957; Peter Vaughan in 1968; and Alfred Burke in 1977. Miles played the role one final time in a 1982 TV movie.
- In 1959, Ivo Garrani played Silver in an Italian television mini-series.
- Ivor Dean played the character in an acclaimed European four-part serial in 1966. He intended to reprise the role in another series with more adventures of Silver and began writing it with director Robert S. Baker, but his sudden death in 1974 stopped all further plans. In 1985, the Ivor Dean script was used as foundation for the Disney 10-part TV series Return to Treasure Island, starring Brian Blessed as Long John Silver.
- In the 1978 Japanese animated series Takarajima directed by Osamu Dezaki the character is voiced by Genzō Wakayama.
- Anthony Quinn played Silver in the 1987 Italian mini-series Treasure Island in Outer Space.
- In the 1993 British animated series The Legends of Treasure Island Silver is voiced by Richard E. Grant in the first series. In the second series aired in 1995 he is voiced by Rob Brydon.
- Eddie Izzard played Long John Silver in the 2012 Sky drama.
- Luke Arnold played John Silver in the Starz television series Black Sails (2014–2017), a prequel story set 20 years before Treasure Island.
- Costas Mandylor portrays Captain Silver in the 2016 episode "The Brothers Jones" on ABC's Once Upon a Time.

=== Other print media ===
- A Ballad of John Silver, a poem by John Masefield, was published in 1921.
- Long John Silver is a Franco-Belgian comics series written by Xavier Dorison and illustrated by Mathieu Laufray which was published in French and English.
- John Silver, a fictional space pirate with mechanical leg who appears in the Italian comic book Nathan Never, was inspired by Long John Silver.

=== Other ===
- In May 1960, The Silver Beetles (later to become known as The Beatles) were backing a young musician Johnny Gentle, during his tour through Scotland. For the duration of this tour, the whole band decided to give themselves pseudonyms. Band member John Lennon became Long John for this occasion.
- The rock band Jefferson Airplane created an album in 1972 named Long John Silver.
- A fast-food seafood restaurant chain, Long John Silver's, is named after the character.
- One of the prominent characters from the role-playing game Cyberpunk is Johnny Silverhand, referencing to John Silver. He is one of the main characters in the video game adaptation Cyberpunk 2077.
- In the strategy video game Tropico 2: Pirate Cove, Long John Silver is one of many playable characters.
- John Silver is a Swedish brand of cigarettes named after the character.

== Bibliography ==
- Stevenson, Robert Louis (1883). Treasure Island. Cassell & Company. Archived from the original on 20 June 2017.
- Elwin, Malcolm (1939). Old Gods Falling. New York: The Macmillan Company. OCLC 968055.
- Prince, Alison (1994). Kenneth Grahame: An Innocent in the Wild Wood. London: Allison & Busby. ISBN 9780850318296.
- Karg, Barbara; Spaite, Arjean (2007). The Everything Pirates Book: A Swashbuckling History of Adventure on the High Seas. Avon, MA: Adams Media. ISBN 9781598692556.
- Jolly, Arthur M (2013). Long Joan Silver. Los Angeles: YouthPLAYS, Inc. ISBN 9781620882054.
