= First Fleet Re-enactment Voyage =

Project to assemble a fleet of tall ships

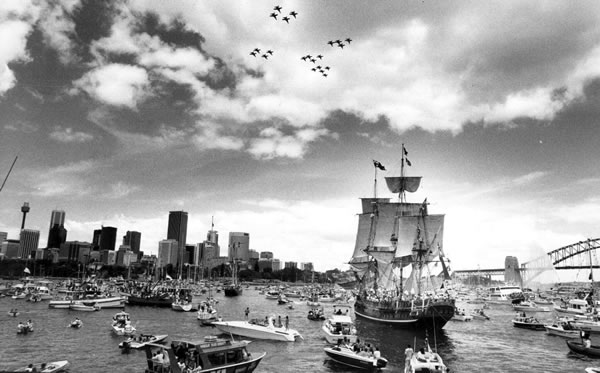
Watercraft on Sydney Harbour welcome the First Fleet Reenactment Voyage to Sydney on Australia Day 1988

The First Fleet Reenactment Voyage (also known as the Second First Fleet) was a project to assemble a fleet of tall ships to sail from England to Australia in a historical reenactment of the First Fleet that colonised Australia in 1788. The reenactment was first conceived in 1977 and organised to commemorate Australia's bicentenary of colonisation. Despite opposition and minimal funding from the Australian government, the project attracted the support of high-profile adventurers Thor Heyerdahl, Alan Villiers, and Sir Edmund Hillary, as well as former Australian political figures and the British royal family. Several corporations offered to sponsor the fleet as a whole or individual ships, and additional money was raised by selling "training crew" berths for the various legs of the voyage.

Seven ships—Søren Larsen, R. Tucker Thompson, Anna Kristina, Amorina, Tradewind, Our Svanen, and Bounty—sailed from Portsmouth in May 1987, following a fleet review by Queen Elizabeth II. Attempting to follow the route of the original First Fleet, the ships sailed for Australia via Tenerife, Rio de Janeiro, Cape Town, and Mauritius. The initial funding ran out when the ships reached Rio de Janeiro, and the captains planned to call off the voyage until a radiothon on Australia's Macquarie Radio Network raised $900,000 and further corporate sponsorships were secured. The seven ships were joined by One and All off Rio de Janeiro. While crossing the Atlantic to Cape Town, Anna Kristina's first mate Henrik Bak Nielsen was lost overboard.

The fleet reached Fremantle in early December 1987, where it was joined by Eye of the Wind. It then continued along the Australian coast, arriving in Sydney Harbour on 26 January 1988, Australia Day. Eleven reenactment vessels participated in the final arrival, matching the number of ships in the original First Fleet, alongside visiting international tall ships and thousands of spectator craft. The project was later named the Bicentenary's "Best Event", but incurred a financial loss.

== Background ==
In 1787, a fleet of eleven small sailing ships departed from England, carrying convicts, marines, and sailors. The ships were heading for New South Wales, the territory claimed by James Cook during his first voyage of discovery in 1770, when he located and charted the eastern coast of New Holland (now Australia). The loss of the American penal colonies following the War of American Independence (and the resulting pressure it put on the British gaol system) combined with the need to secure this new territory against potential Dutch or French claims. The founding of a penal colony in New South Wales was approved by Prime Minister William Pitt, with Captain Arthur Phillip selected as the colonisation fleet's commander and the new colony's first Governor.

Eleven ships were acquired to be part of this voyage: the convict transports Alexander, Charlotte, Friendship, Lady Penrhyn, Prince of Wales, and Scarborough; the storeships Golden Grove, Fishburn, and Borrowdale; and the naval vessels HMS Sirius and HMS Supply. The fleet sailed from Portsmouth on 17 May 1787, and called at Santa Cruz de Tenerife, Rio de Janeiro, and Cape Town before using the Roaring Forties to cross the southern Indian Ocean and round Van Diemen's Land. The fleet arrived in Botany Bay, then relocated to the more suitable Port Jackson, where the colony was founded on 26 January 1788. The First Fleet is considered remarkable because it was the longest migratory voyage ever attempted, with all eleven ships reaching their destination within three days of each other, while only 48 of the 1,350 embarked died during the nine-month voyage.

To commemorate the 1988 Australian Bicentenary, Jonathan King (descendant of Lieutenant Philip King, Arthur Phillip's aide-de-camp) proposed in 1977 that a reenactment voyage made up of square-rigged sailing vessels similar to those used by the First Fleet be made. The project was met with opposition from Australian individuals and organisations. There was concern that by emphasising the British colonisation of Australia, the reenactment voyage would negatively remind people of the nations' convict origins. Offending Aboriginal Australians, whose land was stolen from them by the colonisation, was also a concern. Indigenous Australians did criticise the bicentenary celebrations and the reenactment as commemorating invasion: on 26 January 1988, thousands marched in Sydney in protest and activists established an Aboriginal Tent Embassy at Mrs Macquarie's Chair.

== Setup ==
King created the First Fleet Venture as a Melbourne University-backed project in 1978, and approached the Australian Government for funding and assistance. The government declined to support the project unless it was shown to be commercially viable. King dissolved the university project board in 1982, and created a commercial group. The assistance of entrepreneur Wally Franklin was secured in 1983. Franklin and King secured assistance from Hoyts/Michael Edgley Productions, as well as Australian Himalayan Expeditions. Following this, Franklin founded the First Fleet Reenactment Company, and bought out King's group. Franklin, King, and solicitor Philip King sat on the board, along with representatives from Hoyts/Edgley and Australian Himalayan Expeditions. Norwegian adventurer Thor Heyerdahl joined the project as honorary president. New Zealand mountaineer Sir Edmund Hillary and Australian mariner Alan Villiers became patrons of the reenactment. Further support came from former Australian prime ministers Malcolm Fraser and Bob Hawke, and from the British royal family.

Original plans called for a fleet of eleven 18th-century-styled replica ships to be constructed or chartered. By 1980, this was scaled back to building just two replicas: flagship HMS Sirius and one of the convict transports. After the replica Bounty (which was a contemporary and very similar in design to Sirius) became available, the plans to construct replicas were abandoned, with the fleet to be made up of modern chartered vessels. Most of the vessels were British- or European-based tall ships chartered during 1985.

Funding was promised by the New South Wales Government, which provided a $230,000 seed grant for the project, followed by a later contribution of $500,000. Sponsorship for the project was promised by entities including Fairfax Media, Westpac, Qantas and Australian Airlines, and the Portsmouth City Council. Other companies (including Coca-Cola, Australia Post, and Fuji/Hanimex) sponsored individual ships. Many of the sponsorship contracts stipulated that at least six ships had to be sailing in company at any time. Additional funding came through the sale of "training crew" berths for each leg of the voyage: these people were expected to supplement the professional crew on each vessel. With the financial viability of the project appearing to be in hand, the Australian Bicentennial Authority loaned $500,000 to the First Fleet Reenactment Company, but refused to provide any further funding or support.

=== Ships involved ===
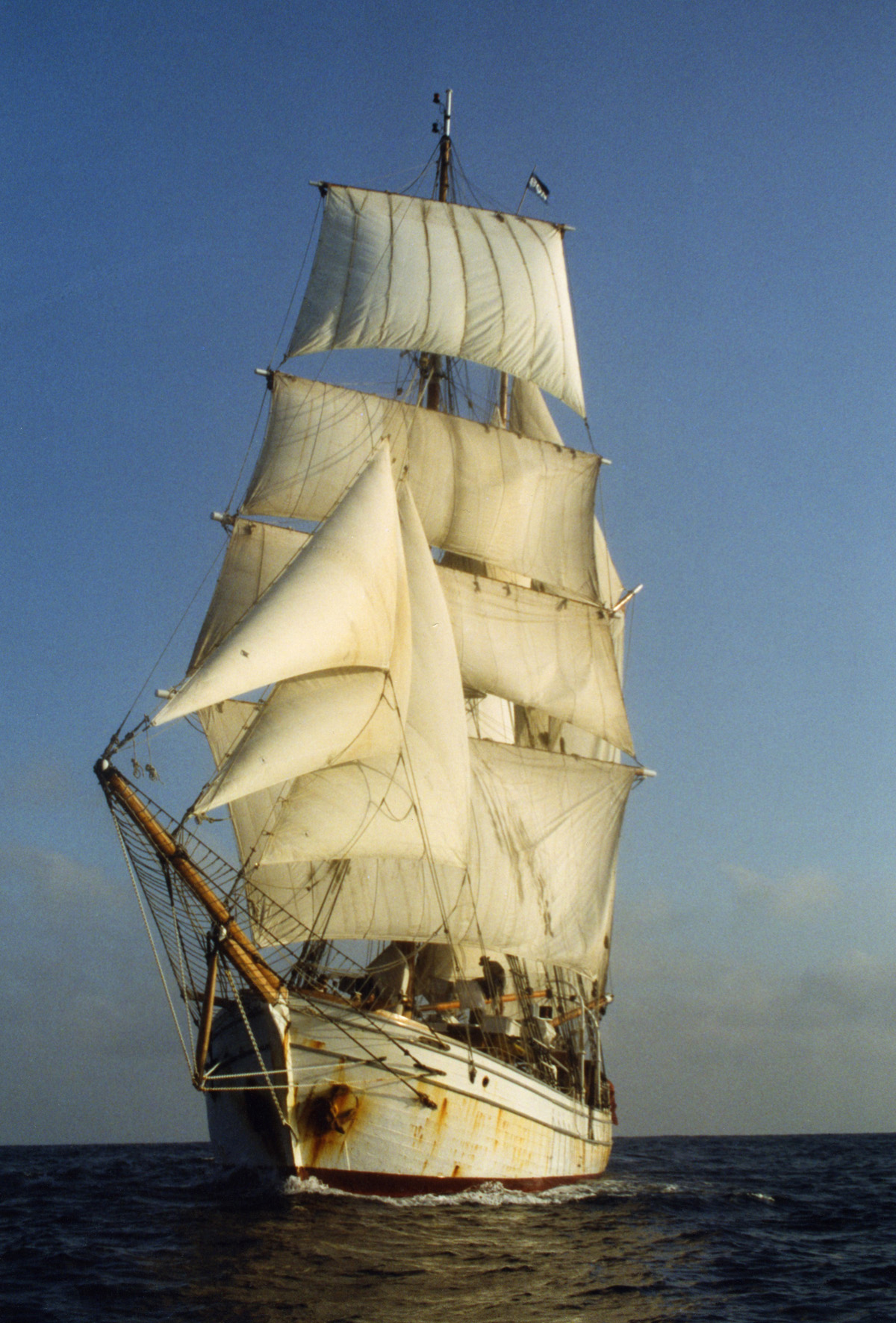
Søren Larsen, flagship of the voyage

- Søren Larsen: Flagship of the reenactment, Søren Larsen was built in 1949. The Danish-built, British-flagged vessel was chartered for the voyage in 1986, and joined the fleet in London.
- R. Tucker Thompson: Built during the 1980s in New Zealand as a modern square-rigged vessel with a steel hull and wood topsides. R. Tucker Thompson was the first of the fleet to assemble, berthing in London in early April.
- Anna Kristina: The oldest ship in the reenactment fleet, the galeas Anna Kristina was built in 1889 on a Norwegian farm. Anna Kristina joined the fleet in Portsmouth.
- Amorina: Originally built in 1934 as a lightship for the Swedish government, Amorina was sold into civilian service in 1977. She sailed with the fleet from London.
- Tradewind: The Netherlands-flagged schooner Tradewind was built in 1911, and had a long career as a fishing vessel and freighter before being converted for sail training and expedition charter in the 1980s. Departed from London.
- Our Svanen: A Danish barquentine built in 1922, Our Svanen served as a trade ship until the 1960s, then was sold to Canadian owners. She joined the fleet at Portsmouth.
- Bounty: A replica of the 18th century HMAV Bounty, the vessel was built in New Zealand during 1978 and 1979. The full-rigged barque conforms externally to the original ship, but has a wood-clad steel hull and modern fittings. Bounty sailed from Portsmouth.
- One and All: An Australian-flagged brigantine, One and All was built during the 1980s, completed in 1987. Immediately after completion, she sailed for the Atlantic to intercept the rest of the fleet en route, meeting them off Rio de Janeiro.
- Eye of the Wind: A German-built schooner, Eye of the Wind was involved in cargo hauling and fishing from 1911 until she was re-rigged as a brigantine in 1969. She joined the fleet at Fremantle for the final legs.
- STS Leeuwin II: A three-masted barquentine, named after the Dutch galleon Leeuwin which mapped the south-west coast of Australia in 1622. She was built in Australia by Len Randell in 1986 and based in Fremantle. She joined the fleet at Botany Bay.
- Solway Lass: A Dutch-built two-masted schooner built in 1902 and based in Australia. She joined the fleet at Botany Bay.

==== Joined for Australia Day celebration in Sydney ====
- Asgard II: A brigantine, the Irish national sail training vessel, she was built for Coiste an Asgard in 1981.
- Capitán Miranda: A Uruguayan Navy sail training ship built by Sociedad Española de Construcción Naval in 1930.
- Dar Młodzieży: A Polish sail training ship built in 1981 at the Gdańsk Shipyard.
- Barque Eagle: A U.S. Coast Guard sail training ship built in 1936 by Blohm und Voß.
- Esmeralda: A Chilean Navy sail training ship built in Cádiz in 1953.
- Gorch Fock: A German Navy sail training ship built by Blohm & Voss in 1958.
- ARC Gloria: A Colombian Navy sail training ship built by Astilleros Celaya in 1967.
- BAE Guayas: An Ecuadorian Navy sail training ship built by Astilleros Celaya in 1977.
- Juan Sebastián de Elcano: A Spanish Navy sail training ship built by Horacio Echevarrieta in 1928.
- Kaiwo Maru: A Japanese sail training ship built by Kawasaki Shipbuilding Corporation in 1930
- Nippon Maru: A Japanese sail training ship built by Sumitomo Heavy Industries in 1984.
- Shabab Oman: A Royal Navy of Oman sail training ship built by Herd & McKenzie in 1971.
- Spirit of New Zealand: A Kiwi sail training ship built by Thackwray Yachts Limited for Spirit of Adventure Trust in 1986.
- STS Young Endeavour: An Australian sail training ship built in 1987 by Brooke Marine in the UK for the Young Endeavour Youth Scheme. She was presented as a gift to Australia in honour of the Bicentenary by Prince Charles on 25 January, 1988.

==== Participated in the departure ceremony from the UK ====
- Johanna Lucretia: A British two-masted topsail schooner built at the Rhoos Shipyard in 1945.
- Kaskelot: A British three-masted barque built in 1948 for the Royal Greenland Trading Company
- STS Lord Nelson: A British sail training ship built by Coles Yard in Cowes for the Jubilee Sailing Trust in 1986.
- TS Royalist: A British sail training ship built by Groves and Guttridge for the Marine Society & Sea Cadets in 1971.
- HMS Sirius (F40): A modern Leander-class frigate of the Royal Navy, namesake of the original HMS Sirius (1786), which served as the flagship of the First Fleet. Sirius (F40) served as Queen Elizabeth's flagship for the review and departure ceremonies.

== Voyage ==
R. Tucker Thompson, Søren Larsen, Amorina, and Tradewind assembled in London during April 1987. They departed on 27 April, accompanied by the barque Kaskelot, which only intended to sail with the fleet for a few days once the reenactment voyage commenced, as the ship was committed to the filming of Return to Treasure Island. The ships proceeded to Portsmouth, where they arrived on 30 April. Here, the initial flotilla was joined by Bounty, Anna Kristina, and Our Svanen. During their time in British waters, the ships of the reenactment voyage proved very popular with the media and the public. From the British perspective, the First Fleet was a major maritime achievement and a successful experiment.

The voyage proper commenced from the Solent on 13 May 1987, after a fleet review by Queen Elizabeth II aboard the frigate HMS Sirius: the modern ship was selected as the reviewing vessel to recognise the Sirius that led the original First Fleet. In addition to the seven re-enactment ships that sailed (One and All was not present: the vessel had only completed fitting out in April, and intended to join the rest of the fleet in the Atlantic), Kaskelot, the schooner Johanna Lucretia, the cadet training brig Royalist, and the charity training ship Lord Nelson increased the fleet size to the historical eleven. However, when the signal to depart was given, the engine on flagship Søren Larsen initially failed to start, then kicked over hard enough to warp the crankshaft. Command of the fleet was temporarily handed over to Bounty (which was originally planned to be flagship of the expedition before the fleet commodore selected Søren Larsen), which led the other ships from Portsmouth while repairs were effected.

From Portsmouth, the fleet headed to Tenerife in the Canary Islands. En route, Tradewind and Our Svanen were called back by the British Department of Transport for further safety checks, and Amorina had to divert to Falmouth, Cornwall to put ashore an engineer who had developed renal colic. On 25 May, the lead ships anchored at Porto Santo to wait for the rest of the fleet to catch up. All bar Our Svanen had regrouped by 26 May, and the fleet carried on. The reenactment fleet arrived off Tenerife on 29 May, and was able to enter the port under full sail.

On 9 June, the fleet sailed from Tenerife for Rio de Janeiro. During the voyage, the main gaff on Anna Kristina broke. The ships diverted to Mindelo in the Cape Verde Islands, where a shipwright was able to sleeve the break with steel. The ships remained for three days while repairs were made. The decision was made to sail for Salvador, then proceed to Rio. The fleet arrived in Salvador on 11 July. Around this time, One and All had reached the Mediterranean via the Suez Canal, but was forced to make for Gibraltar when a weakened topmast became evident.

The seven ships of the reenactment fleet sailed into Rio de Janeiro on 26 July 1987. The arrival was promoted by the media and press, with 100 small vessels accompanying the tall ships into harbour, and the mayor of Rio presenting the fleet with the keys to the city. When the fleet reached Rio de Janeiro, the initial funds had run out, and the promised further funding for the captains and crews had not eventuated. The Australian government would not provide further assistance, as the reenactment would clash with the tall ships regatta that had been organised. The ships' captains threatened to call off the voyage and return to Southampton unless $1 million was guaranteed. The need for more money was pitched by Wally Franklin to radio presenter Mike Carlton, framed as a "David and Goliath" battle of a community-organised reenactment of historical significance unable to gather the support of the government. Carlton and the Macquarie Radio Network organised a rolling "Save The Fleet" radiothon across Friday and the weekend, with each presenter continuing the call for donations and radio station 2GB sacrificing half its commercial airtime for ads promoting the radiothon. $900,000 was raised across the weekend, and the fleet's captains were convinced to continue on with the voyage.

The reenactment voyage commenced its next leg on 9 August, bound for Cape Town. They were escorted out of harbour by two frigates of the Marinha do Brasil. After leaving Rio, One and All finally caught up with the fleet. The ship called into Rio briefly to replenish, then joined the reenactment fleet. While crossing the Atlantic, at 01:20 on 22 August, First Mate Henrik Nielsen from Anna Kristina fell overboard while trying to adjust a sail. Tradewind, R. Tucker Thompson, and Søren Larsen converged on Anna Kristina and began searching: first in the immediate area by searchlight, then commencing a grid pattern at dawn. The search was called off at 18:35 with no success.

The fleet reached Cape Town on 10 September. Some of the ships were slipped for maintenance and repairs. The voyage continued on 28 September, with the fleet departing for Mauritius. The fleet made good progress, but as the larger ships needed more wind power, they diverted further south, deeper into the Roaring Forties. When attempting to climb back north-east towards Mauritius, the winds dropped for several days, and Amorina ran out of fuel for her engine. During a two-day operation, 2,500 litres (550 imp gal; 660 US gal) of fuel was shuttled from Bounty to Amorina by the former's rescue boat. Spread out by the rough southern Indian Ocean conditions, the arrival at Mauritius was staggered between 24 and 29 October. A four-week International Festival of the Sea was organised around the presence of the tall ships, with the Reenactment Voyage as the centrepiece of Australia Week. During the stay at Mauritius, Our Svanen, which had been British-flagged to this point, was re-registered as a Canadian vessel.

The eight ships departed on 10 November to cross the Indian Ocean to Fremantle. Fremantle was reached on 12 December. Here, they were joined by Eye of the Wind. On 26 December, the now nine-strong fleet sailed for Botany Bay. The fleet briefly called into Jervis Bay before continuing north to Botany Bay. Botany Bay was reached on 18 January 1988, the day the first ships of the original First Fleet arrived in 1788. While maintaining the ships and waiting to commence the final leg of the voyage, the schooner Solway Lass and the sail training barquentine Leeuwin II arrived to bring the reenactment fleet strength up to the historical eleven ships.

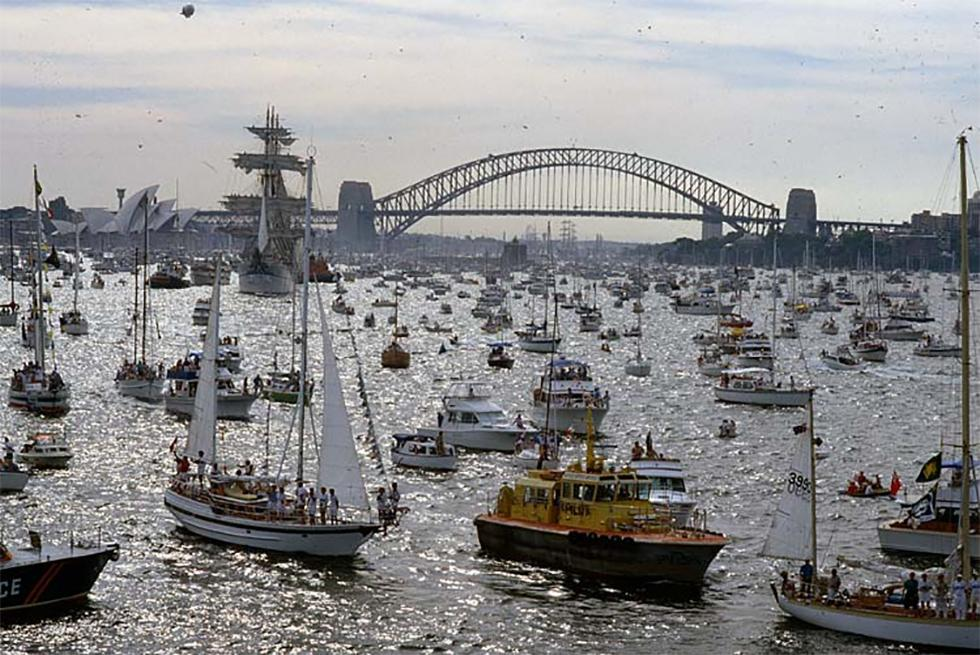
A flotilla of spectator craft gathered within Sydney Harbour as part of Australia's Bicentenary celebrations

At 05:30 on Australia Day (26 January), the Reenactment fleet sailed from Botany Bay. Four hours later, they met with Gorch Fock and many of her sister sail training representatives from a total of 20 nations at Sydney Heads, and commenced a grand parade of sail into Sydney Harbour. Their arrival to the moorings off Farm Cove coincided with Prince Charles' speech on the steps of the Sydney Opera House. An estimated 3,000 vessels were on Sydney Harbour to welcome the fleet.

== Conclusion ==
The First Fleet Reenactment Voyage was awarded "Best Event" of the bicentennial.
