= Anna Kristina (ship) =

Norwegian ship built in 1889

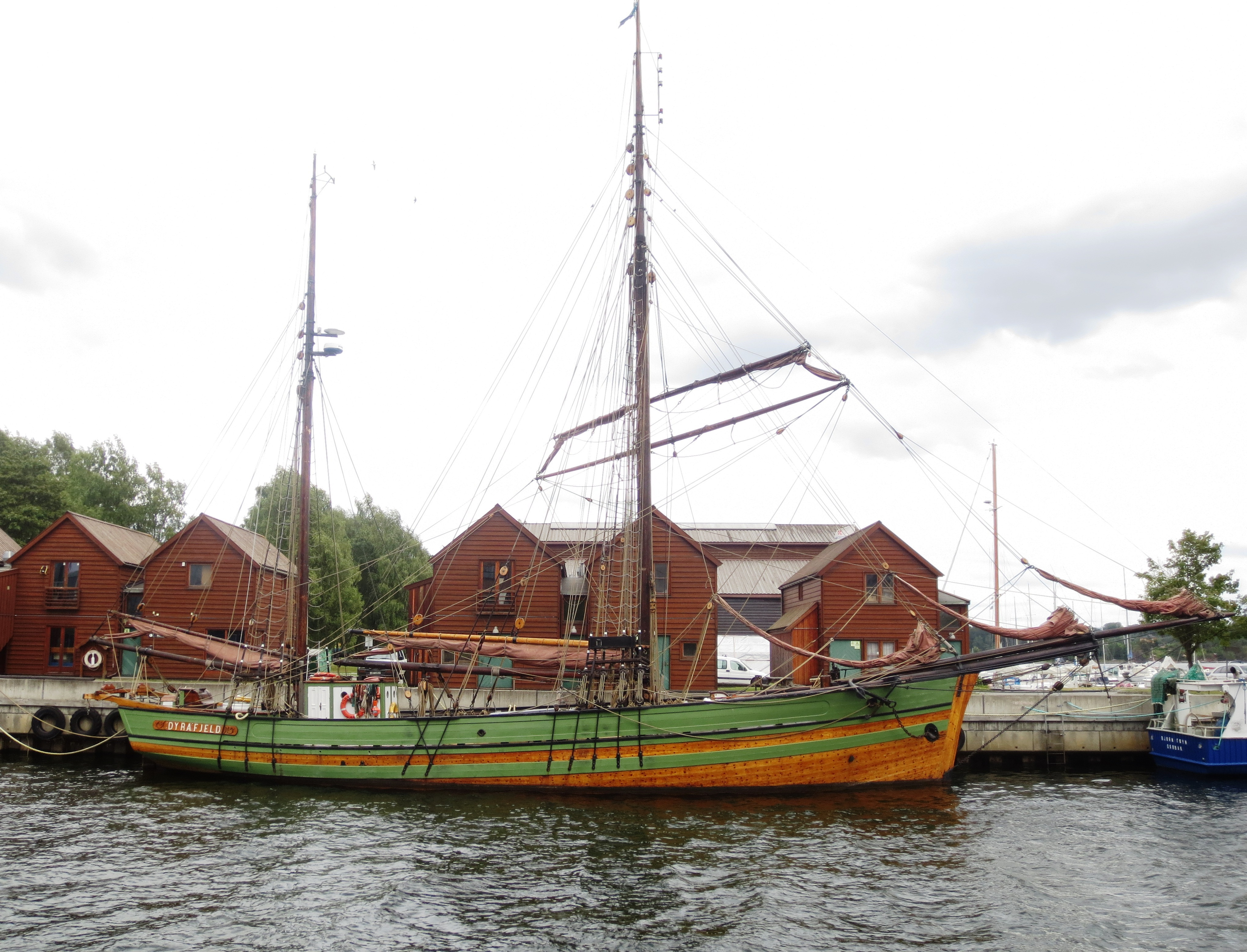

History

Norway
- Completed: 1889
- Identification: MMSI number: 258137000; Callsign: LFUQ
- Status: In service

General characteristics as of 1988
- Type: Hardangerjakt
- Length: 32.9 m (107 ft 11 in)
- Beam: 6.4 m (21 ft 0 in)
- Height: Mast height 24.7 m (81 ft 0 in)
- Draught: 2.6 m (8 ft 6 in)
- Propulsion: Auxiliary 235 hp (175 kW) Volvo engine, 6 knots (11 km/h; 6.9 mph)
- Sail plan: Galeas-rigged, 400 m^{2} (4,300 sq ft) sail area

Anna Kristina is a Norwegian-flagged, galeas-rigged Hardangerjakt. Originally named Dyrafjeld, the sloop-rigged vessel was built on a Norwegian farm in 1889. The ship's early career was as a cargo ship in the Hardanger region, with occasional voyages as far afield as Russia. She was sold to new owners and re-rigged as a galeas in the late 1920s. The sails were removed during World War II, but continued in merchant service until the mid-1970s. After a series of accidents, the vessel was laid up, then sold to new owners, who restored the vessel and renamed her Anna Kristina. Charter work occurred throughout the 1980s, including involvement in the First Fleet Re-enactment Voyage.

== Design and construction ==
The vessel was a Hardangerjakt built on a farm in Stangvik, Norway, during 1889, based on a Det Norske Veritas plan. The hull was 32.9 metres (107 ft 11 in) long, with a beam of 6.4 metres (21 ft 0 in) and a draught of 2.6 metres (8 ft 6 in). She was sloop-rigged, with a square topsail.

== Operational history ==
The vessel was originally named Dyrafjeld. Most of her early operations were cargo runs: dried cod from the Hardanger region to Bergen, then returning with general cargo. On occasion, the vessel would haul timber from Riga, Russia. Dyrafjeld was sail powered until 1900, when a 12-horsepower (8.9 kW) engine was installed. In the late 1920s, Dyrafjeld was sold to new owners, who re-rigged the vessel as a galeas. At the start of World War II, the vessel's rigging was removed, and her engine upgraded. The ship continued in the cargo trade, but capsized in 1975 when a cargo of timber shifted. She was recovered, but damaged again in 1986 in a collision. The vessel was laid up until 1977, when she was sold to new owners, who restored her as a galeas-rigged Hardangerjakt. In this configuration, she had a mast height of 24.7 metres (81 ft 0 in), and a total sail area of 400 square metres (4,300 sq ft).

The restoration work was completed in 1981, with the vessel renamed Anna Kristina. The vessel sailed on numerous charters, including film work and a two-year deployment to Spitzbergen. In 1987, Anna Kristina joined the First Fleet Re-enactment Voyage: a historical re-enactment for the Australian Bicentenary. Prior to the voyage, she was refurbished with a 235-horsepower (175 kW) Volvo engine capable of reaching 6 knots (11 km/h; 6.9 mph), along with increased crew capacity. She left England for Australia in May 1987, and sailed with the fleet to Tenerife and Rio de Janeiro. While crossing the Atlantic, at 01:20 on 22 August, a crewmember fell overboard while trying to adjust a sail. Tradewind, R. Tucker Thompson, and Søren Larsen converged on Anna Kristina and began searching: first in the immediate area by searchlight, then commencing a grid pattern at dawn. The search was called off at 18:35 with no success. The fleet continued on to Cape Town, Mauritius, and Fremantle before arriving in Sydney on Australia Day (26 January) 1988.
