= Cabin Fever 2 =

Cabin Fever 2 may refer to:

- Cabin Fever 2: Spring Fever, an American horror film
- Cabin Fever 2 (mixtape), a 2012 mixtape by Wiz Khalifa
- Cabin Fever II, the name under which the ship Johanna Lucretia was known on the TV series Cabin Fever
