= Amazing Grace (2006 film) =

2006 film by Michael Apted

- Theatrical release poster
- Directed by: Michael Apted
- Written by: Steven Knight
- Produced by: Patricia Heaton; David Hunt; Terrence Malick; Edward R. Pressman; Ken Wales
- Starring: Ioan Gruffudd; Romola Garai; Ciaran Hinds; Rufus Sewell; Youssou N'Dour; Michael Gambon; Albert Finney
- Cinematography: Remi Adefarasin
- Edited by: Rick Shaine
- Music by: David Arnold
- Production companies: FourBoys Films; Walden Media; Bristol Bay Productions; Ingenious Film Partners
- Distributed by: Momentum Pictures (United Kingdom); Roadside Attractions; Samuel Goldwyn Films (United States)
- Release dates: 16 September 2006 (TIFF); 23 February 2007 (US); 23 March 2007 (UK)
- Running time: 118 minutes
- Countries: United Kingdom; United States
- Language: English
- Budget: $29 million
- Box office: $32.1 million

Amazing Grace is a 2006 biographical drama film directed by Michael Apted, about the abolitionist campaign against the slave trade in the British Empire, led by William Wilberforce, who was responsible for steering anti-slave trade legislation through the British parliament. The title is a reference to the 1772 hymn "Amazing Grace". The film also recounts the experiences of John Newton as a captain of slave ships and subsequent Christian conversion, which inspired his writing of the poem later used in the hymn. Newton is portrayed as a major influence on Wilberforce and the abolition movement.

The film premiered on 16 September 2006 at the Toronto International Film Festival, followed by showings at the Heartland Film Festival, the Santa Barbara International Film Festival, and the European Film Market, before opening in wide US release on 23 February 2007, which coincided with the 200th anniversary of the date the British parliament voted to ban the slave trade.

== Plot ==
In 1797, William Wilberforce is severely ill and taking a recuperative holiday in Bath, Somerset, with his cousin, Henry Thornton. It is here that Wilberforce is introduced to his future wife, Barbara Spooner. Although he initially resists any romantic overtures, she convinces him to relate the story of his career.

The story flashes back 15 years to 1782, and Wilberforce recounts the events that led him to where he is now. Beginning as a young, ambitious, and popular Member of Parliament (MP), he experiences a religious enlightenment and aligns himself with the evangelical wing of the Church of England. Wilberforce contemplates leaving politics to study theology, but is persuaded by his friends William Pitt, Thomas Clarkson, Hannah More, and Olaudah Equiano that he will be more effective doing the work of God by taking on the unpopular and dangerous issue of the abolition of the British slave trade. His conviction in the cause deepens following a meeting with his former mentor John Newton (introduced mopping a church floor dressed in sackcloth) who is said to live "in the company of 20,000 ghosts… slaves". As a former slave ship captain turned Christian, he deeply regrets his past life and the effects on his fellow man. Newton urges Wilberforce to take up the cause.

Pitt becomes Prime Minister and Wilberforce becomes a key supporter and confidant. Pitt gives Wilberforce the opportunity to present a bill before the house outlawing the slave trade. Wilberforce's passionate campaigning leads him to become highly unpopular in the House of Commons. He is opposed by a coalition of MPs and peers representing vested interests of the slave trade in London, Bristol, Glasgow, and Liverpool led by Banastre Tarleton and the Duke of Clarence. Despite popular support and the assistance of an unlikely ally in the form of Charles James Fox, Wilberforce's bill to abolish the slave trade goes down to defeat. Afterward, the film portrays Pitt as one of his few friends and allies remaining in Parliament, however even their relationship becomes strained. Pitt, now facing the stresses of leading a shaky coalition during the French Revolutionary Wars, tells Wilberforce that his cause must now wait for a more stable political climate.

Wilberforce keeps up the fight but after years of failure he is left exhausted and frustrated that he was unable to change anything in the government. Believing his life's work has been in vain, he becomes physically ill, suffering from chronic colitis which causes him to become addicted to laudanum prescribed for the crippling pain, which brings the story back up to 1797. Having virtually given up hope, Wilberforce considers leaving politics forever. Barbara convinces him to keep fighting because there is no other person who is willing or able to do so. A few days afterward, William Wilberforce and Barbara marry. Several years pass with no further success. Wilberforce's wife and new children provide him with the support and strength needed to carry on the fight.

Finally, with a renewed hope for success Wilberforce devises a backdoor method of slowly weakening the slave trade through seemingly innocuous legislation. Aided by Thornton, Clarkson, and new ally James Stephen and cheered on by the now terminally ill Pitt, he reintroduces his bill to abolish the slave trade. In time, after the 20-year campaign and many attempts to bring legislation forward, he is eventually responsible for a bill being passed through Parliament in 1807, which abolishes the slave trade in the British Empire forever.

== Cast ==
- Ioan Gruffudd as William Wilberforce
- Romola Garai as Barbara Spooner
- Benedict Cumberbatch as William Pitt the Younger
- Albert Finney as John Newton
- Michael Gambon as Charles James Fox
- Rufus Sewell as Thomas Clarkson
- Youssou N'Dour as Olaudah Equiano
- Ciarán Hinds as Banastre Tarleton
- Toby Jones as William, Duke of Clarence
- Nicholas Farrell as Henry Thornton
- Sylvestra Le Touzel as Marianne Thornton
- Jeremy Swift as Richard the Butler
- Stephen Campbell Moore as James Stephen
- Bill Paterson as Henry Dundas
- Nicholas Day as Sir William Dolben
- Georgie Glen as Hannah More

== Production ==
The film was shot primarily in Hull, East Riding of Yorkshire. Baker's Quay, which forms part of the Parliament Docks on the Gloucester and Sharpness Canal, was used as a backdrop against which to recreate the atmosphere of the East India Docks in London circa 1780. Shooting took place during October 2005 and involved the tall ships, Kaskelot, Earl of Pembroke, Johanna Lucretia and Phoenix. During January 2006, the scenes from the Houses of Parliament were shot at the 1743 Church within Chatham Historic Dockyard. The wedding scene was filmed at St Mary’s Church, Garsington in Oxfordshire.

A number of outside scenes were shot at the former Greenwich Hospital, now part of the University of Greenwich, and around Salisbury, Wiltshire.

The executive producer was Jeanney Kim, with Mark Cooper as co-producer. Producers on the film were Terrence Malick (The Thin Red Line) and Ed Pressman under their Sunflower Productions banner, Patricia Heaton and David Hunt for FourBoys Films, and Ken Wales.

== Music ==
- Amazing Grace (soundtrack)
- Amazing Grace (score)

The soundtrack of Christian music included the title song "Amazing Grace (My Chains Are Gone)" by Chris Tomlin. The score was named Instrumental Album of the Year at the Dove Awards of 2008.

== Reception ==
=== Box office ===
Amazing Grace brought in a little over $4 million at the US box office over its opening weekend of 23–25 February 2007, making it the 10th-highest-grossing film for the weekend, behind such new releases as The Astronaut Farmer and The Number 23. As of 26 August 2007 the film had $32,050,774.

=== Critical response ===
Amazing Grace received positive reviews. Philip French described the film as "not exactly innovative" and compared it to "earnestly worthy prewar Warner Brothers cinebiographies". Overall he called it "a very decent contribution to the present bicentennial celebrations of the parliamentary bill that outlawed the slave trade in the British empire". Wally Hammond writing for Time Out singled out Benedict Cumberbatch's performance for praise saying his performance "quietly upstaged" the fine performance of Gruffudd. The Guardian gave it a C− for the entertainment value and an A− for its historical accuracy.

Review aggregation website Rotten Tomatoes gives the film a score of 68% based on review from 123 critics, with an average rating of 6.50/10. According to the website, the film is "your quintessential historical biopic: stately, noble, and with plenty of electrifying performances". Metacritic gives the film a 65 out of 100, based on reviews from 29 critics, indicating "generally favorable reviews".

== Awards and nominations ==
Year	Award	Category	Nominated work	Result
2008	Evening Standard British Film Awards	Best Screenplay	Steven Knight	Nominated
2008	London Film Critics' Circle	British Breakthrough – Acting	Benedict Cumberbatch	Nominated
2008	Christopher Award	Feature Film	Amazing Grace	Won
2008	Genesis Awards	Outstanding Feature Film	Amazing Grace	Nominated
2007	Humanitas Prize	Feature Film	Amazing Grace	Nominated
2007	Satellite Award	Production Design	David Allday; Matthew Gray; Charles Wood	Nominated
2007	Satellite Award	Best Costume Design	Jenny Beavan	Nominated

== See also ==
- List of films featuring slavery
