= Postboy (ship) =

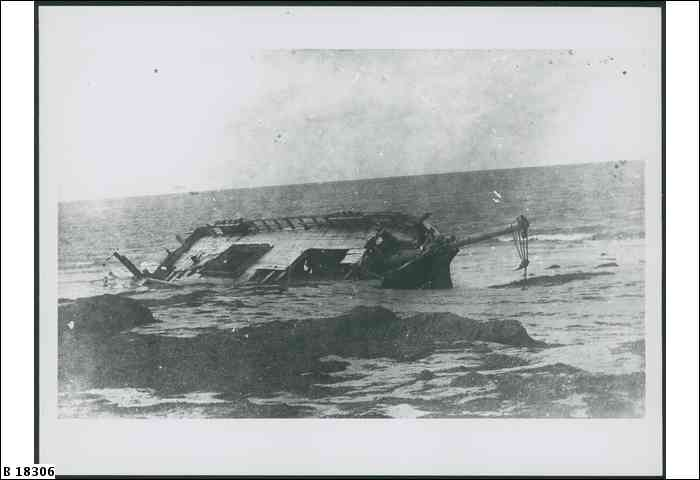
- Wreck of Postboy, Arno Bay, circa 1920

History
- Name: Postboy
- Owner: Weman and Morgan
- Launched: 1874
- Out of service: October 1905
- Fate: Wrecked Arno Bay, SA 1905

General characteristics
- Class & type: Schooner
- Tonnage: 63 tons
- Length: 77 ft 0 in (23.47 m)
- Beam: 19 ft 0 in (5.79 m)
- Draught: 7 ft 0 in (2.13 m)
- Propulsion: Sail
- Notes: wooden hull

The 63 ton schooner Postboy was built at Port Adelaide in 1874. The schooner was owned by Messrs. Weman and Morgan and registered at Port Adelaide. She was a regular trading vessel between Port Adelaide and the gulf ports.

Captain James Thomas was in charge of Postboy on 15 December 1876 about 11–12 miles (20 km) off Glenelg when a sudden squall struck. She was returning from Port MacDonnell, South Australia to Port Adelaide, South Australia, with a small cargo of bark and stone ballast and seven people on board. The wind pushed the vessel bodily over and she lay on her side with sails floating in the water, resulting in the loss of 6 lives. Thomas was drowned and his body was found on Kirkcaldy Beach on 26 December 1876. His wife Sarah was pregnant with daughter Edith Emily at the time.

Postboy was refitted but was eventually wrecked at Arno Bay, South Australia after being driven ashore by a squall on 22 October 1905, and was said to have been burnt on the beach. The ship's wreck site is protected by the South Australian Historic Shipwrecks Act 1981 and is located at 33°55′12″S 136°34′12″E. The figurehead of Postboy is in the South Australian Maritime Museum at Port Adelaide.

The vessel One and All, built at North Haven as part of Australia's 150th jubilee project, is based on a design of Postboy.

== See also ==
- List of shipwrecks of Australia

== Further Information ==
The online collection of the State Library of South Australia includes the following image of the ship before its 1905 wrecking:

- 'Port Augusta harbour on 27 September 1884 with wooden schooner Postboy loading at the end of the jetty; 1884,' at http://images.slsa.sa.gov.au/edwardes/39/PRG1373_39_2_3.htm, retrieved 03/07/2012.
