= R. Tucker Thompson =

Coordinates: 35°19′S 174°07′E

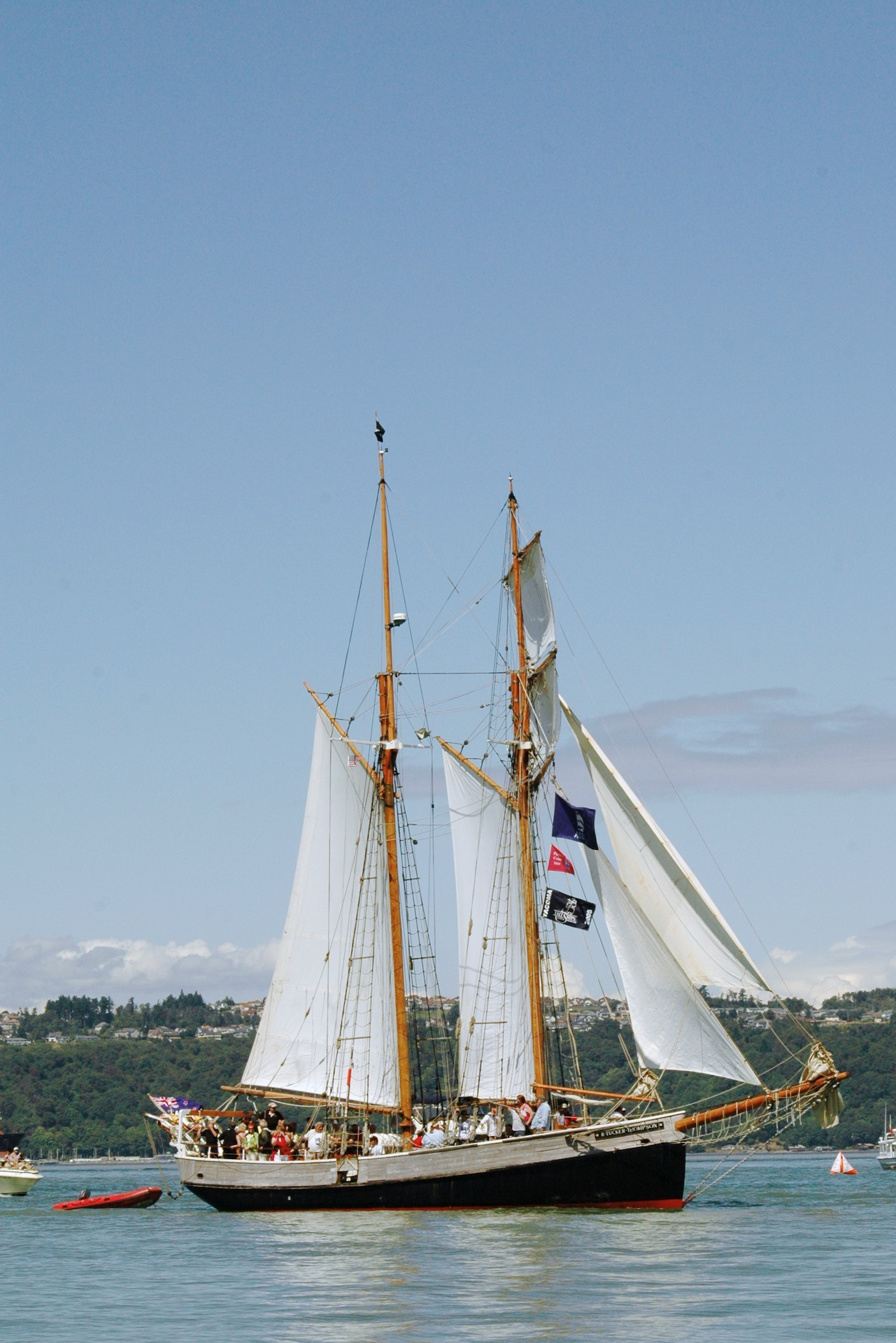
- R. Tucker Thompson

History
- Name: R. Tucker Thompson
- Builder: Northland, NZ
- Launched: 12 October 1985
- Homeport: Opua, New Zealand
- Identification: MMSI number: 512120000; Callsign: ZMA2808
- Status: in active service

General characteristics
- Type: Schooner
- Displacement: 44 t (43 long tons)
- Length: 85 ft (26 m) Sparred length; 65 ft (20 m) Length on deck; 58 ft (18 m) w/l
- Beam: 16 ft (4.9 m)
- Height: 72 ft (22 m)
- Draught: 8 ft 6 in (2.59 m)
- Propulsion: 3,000 sq ft (300 m^{2}) sails
- Sail plan: Gaff-rigged tops’l schooner

R. Tucker Thompson is a gaff-rigged topsail schooner based in Opua, Bay of Islands, New Zealand. She is operated as a non-for profit charitable trust and owned by the R. Tucker Thompson Sail Training Trust. The mission of the trust is “Learning for Life through the Sea”. The ship is used for tourism day sails in the Bay of Islands from October through April and for sail training activities between May and September. Youth sail training is particularly focused at youth from the Tai Tokerau Northland region of New Zealand. She is a member of the Australian Sail Training Association (AUSTA), and participated in the American Sail Training Association (ASTA) West Coast Tall Ships Challenge events in 2002 and 2005.

== Design ==
The ship was designed by Pete Culler, a naval architect in the United States, as a working fishing boat with a large engine and a small sailing rig. Tucker Thompson changed her design to build her in steel and extended her by more than two metres, making the hull longer and deeper to accommodate the tall rigging. Her design is based on a halibut schooner and a replica of vessels that plied their trade on the Pacific West Coast of the US in the early 19th century.

The schooner was constructed with a welded steel hull and decking, with topsides and deck overlay made from kwila. As built, the vessel is 25.9 metres (85 ft) in length overall, with a beam of 4.9 metres (16 ft), and a draught of 2.6 metres (8 ft 6 in). The rigging arrangement is described as a gaff-rigged square-topsail schooner with three-quarter course. The ship's mast height is 19.8 metres (65 ft), and she has a sail area of 307 square metres (3,300 sq ft). Auxiliary propulsion is provided by a 120-horsepower (89 kW) Ford diesel engine, capable of driving R. Tucker Thompson at 5 knots (9.3 km/h; 5.8 mph).

== Building ==
R. Tucker Thompson was started by Robert Tucker Thompson and his son Tod. Tucker Thompson was born in California and always called Tucker. He and his family emigrated to New Zealand in January 1971. After a few years he moved to Whangarei Heads. In 1977, he started work on the ship with his son, Tod. Tucker became ill in 1978, and died later that year at the age of 49. By this point, the plating was almost complete, but the hull lay there for some years before Tod decided to work on it again. In a chance meeting, while working in Whangarei on the Bounty replica, Tod met Russell Harris and the pair went into partnership to complete the ship.

Work resumed in 1982, when the hull was moved to Mangawhai Heads. Limited funds meant that things had to be recycled. The massive fisherman's anchor was found when a pub was being auctioned in Auckland and is stamped with the seal of approval of Lloyds Proving house in Chatham. The anchor windlass was modified from the back of a bulldozer; the bits were made from railway sleepers. The belaying pin and handsome wheel were made from old puriri fence posts. Spars were scarfed and laminated of Douglas Fir taken from an old Auckland building demolished to make way for the Regent Hotel. The varnished cap rail was made from demolition kauri. Skylights came from the yacht Askoy.

She was launched on Mangawhai Beach on 12 October 1985. Karewa, a Māori figurine to be her guardian, was carved by Gordon Hatfield and presented by William MacDonald Taylor, both of Ngāpuhi.

== History ==
Shortly after launching, the ship was chartered for the filming of The Adventurer in the Bay of Islands. In late 1986, R. Tucker Thompson sailed to England via the South Pacific and the Panama Canal to join the First Fleet Re-enactment Voyage: a historical re-enactment for the Australian Bicentenary. She left England for Australia in May 1987, and sailed with the fleet via Tenerife, Rio de Janeiro, Cape Town, Mauritius, and Fremantle before arriving in Sydney on Australia Day (26 January) 1988.

Russell Harris purchased Tod Thompson's shares in 1993. The ship was then marketed and operated by Fullers Bay of Islands, providing day sails in the Bay of Islands. In the winter, the ship provided a limited quantity of sail training voyages for young people deemed to be “at risk”. In 1995, the vessel participated in the Nuclear Free Pacific protest flotilla. In 2002, the ship was involved in the Sail Korea 2002 international regatta, and participated in the American Sail Training Association (ASTA) West Coast Tall Ships Challenge. In 2003, Fullers decided to build their own sailing vessel and terminated the arrangement with R. Tucker Thompson, which continued to operate directly. A second West Coast Challenge was participated in during 2005.

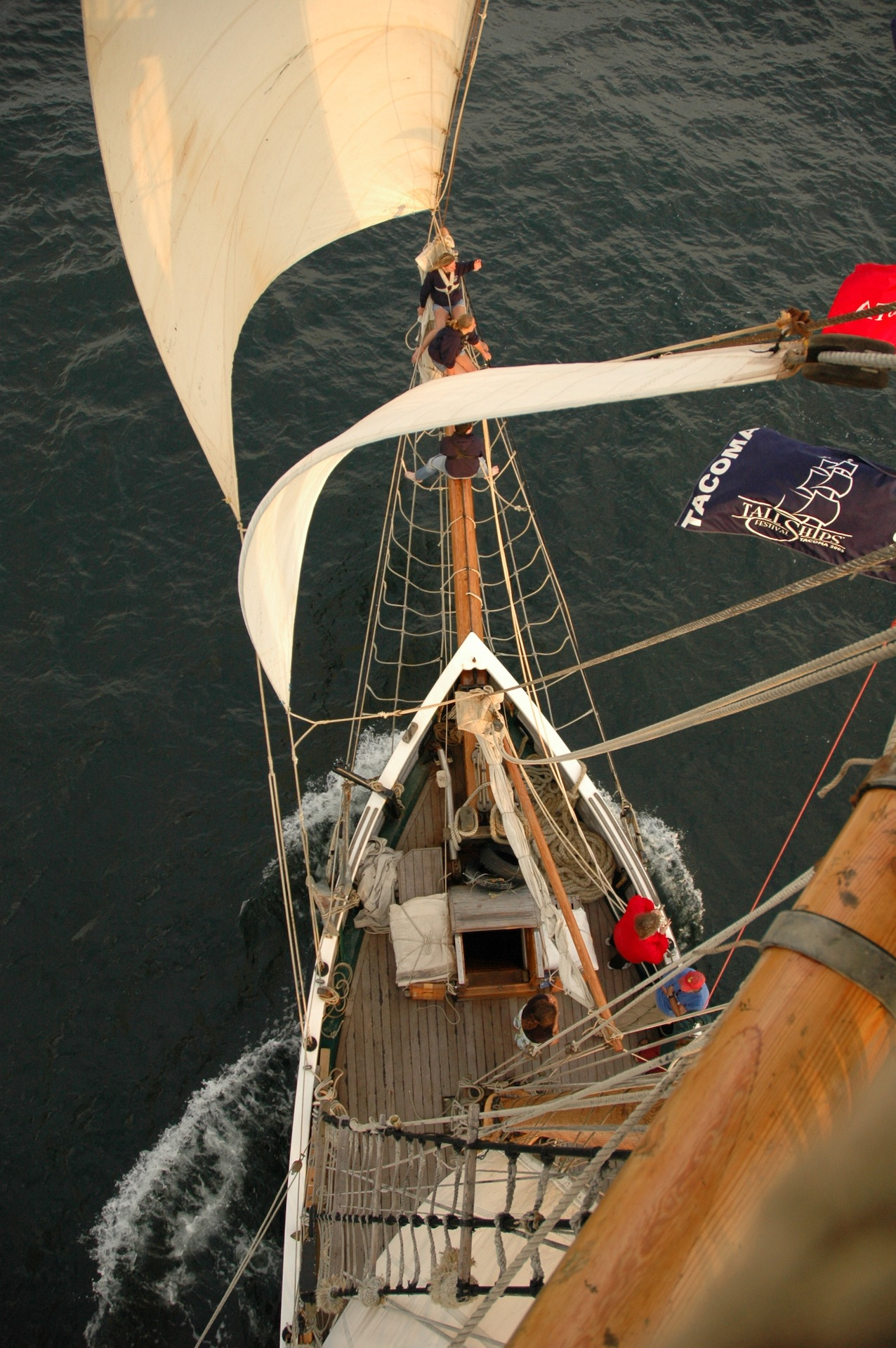
The forward deck from the rigging

On 4 June 2006, Russell Harris gifted R. Tucker Thompson to the people of Te Tai Tokerau Northland. In a symbolic event, the ship was sailed by Russell, his children and grandchildren from Opua to Russell Kororareka. Schoolchildren from the schools in the Bay of Islands and the community, boarded the ship to sail the ship themselves back into the port of Opua as a new entity. The ship is now operated as a not-for-profit trust with a mission of “Learning for Life through the Sea”. Focus is on education experiences for all ages. Day sails continue during summer providing adults the opportunity to experience tall ship sailing and these have been supplemented with additional youth trips and history trips.

R. Tucker Thompson could not participate in the ASTA West Coast Challenge in 2008, as July 2008 was her maintenance month.

=== Film work ===
The ship has been used in films and documentaries including "The Adventurer" series by TVNZ; "Red", a Somerset Maugham story by Infa Film Germany; Rite of Passage for the Australian First Fleet Re-enactment Company; Life of Mammals by the BBC; Captain's Log, a TVNZ documentary charting Captain Cook's circumnavigation of New Zealand; BBC Scotland's documentary on the life of James Morrison; Survivor: Cook Islands for Survivor Entertainment Group and Leo Houlding's "On the Edge" for Ginger TV.

== See also ==
- Sail training
- List of schooners
