= Amorina (ship) =

Swedish ship built in 1934

History

Sweden
- Builder: Götaverken in Gothenburg
- Completed: 1934
- Identification: IMO number: 1000655; MMSI number: 225366000; Callsign: ECEZ

General characteristics as Amorina
- Type: Barquentine (former lightvessel
- Length: 34.3 metres (113 ft)
- Beam: 7.7 metres (25 ft)
- Height: Mast height 34 metres (112 ft)
- Draught: 4.5 metres (15 ft)
- Ice class: Lloyds' Ice Class A1
- Propulsion: Auxiliary Deutch 500 horsepower (370 kW) diesel, 6.5 knots (12.0 km/h; 7.5 mph)
- Sail plan: Barquentine-rigged

Amorina was built as a lightship in 1934 for the Swedish maritime authorities then designated as lightship 33. It was bought by private parties in 1979, converted to have masts installed and competed in the 1983 Cutty Sark Tall Ships Race.

== Design and construction ==
The vessel was designed as a lightvessel for use by Swedish maritime authorities. Lightship 33 was constructed in 1934 at the Götaverken shipyard in Gothenburg. The hull was built to Lloyds' Ice Class A1, with an icebreaker bow and 170-millimetre (6.7 in)-thick riveted hull plates.

== Operational history ==
From completion until the late 1960s, Lightship 33 was usually moored on station in the Baltic Sea: either at Sydostbrotten or Nordströmsgrund. During the 1960s, the lightships were replaced by the prefabricated Kasun Light Houses. Lightship 33 was laid up in 1970. A group of Swedish sailors, who had lost their vessel in the Mediterranean, formed the company Amorina Cruises, and purchased the lightvessel in 1979. Renamed Amorina, the vessel was refitted into a barquentine at Aveiro, Portugal. Three steel masts were installed and the wheelhouse was relocated, while increased accommodation and a saloon were fitted belowdecks. After refitting, the vessel was 34.3 metres (113 ft) in length, with a beam of 7.7 metres (25 ft), and a draught of 4.5 metres (15 ft). She had a mast height of 34 metres (112 ft), and a total sail area of 650 square metres (7,000 sq ft). Auxiliary propulsion was provided by a Deutch 500 horsepower (370 kW) diesel, with a service speed of 6.5 knots (12.0 km/h; 7.5 mph).

The conversion was completed in 1983, and Amorina participated in that year's Cutty Sark Tall Ships Race. The vessel was based in Stockholm during 1985 and early 1986. In March, Amorina sailed to England and joined the First Fleet Re-enactment Voyage: a historical re-enactment for the Australian Bicentenary. She left England for Australia in May 1987, and sailed with the fleet via Tenerife, Rio de Janeiro, Cape Town, Mauritius, and Fremantle before arriving in Sydney on Australia Day (26 January) 1988.
