= Bounty (1978 ship) =

1978 ship

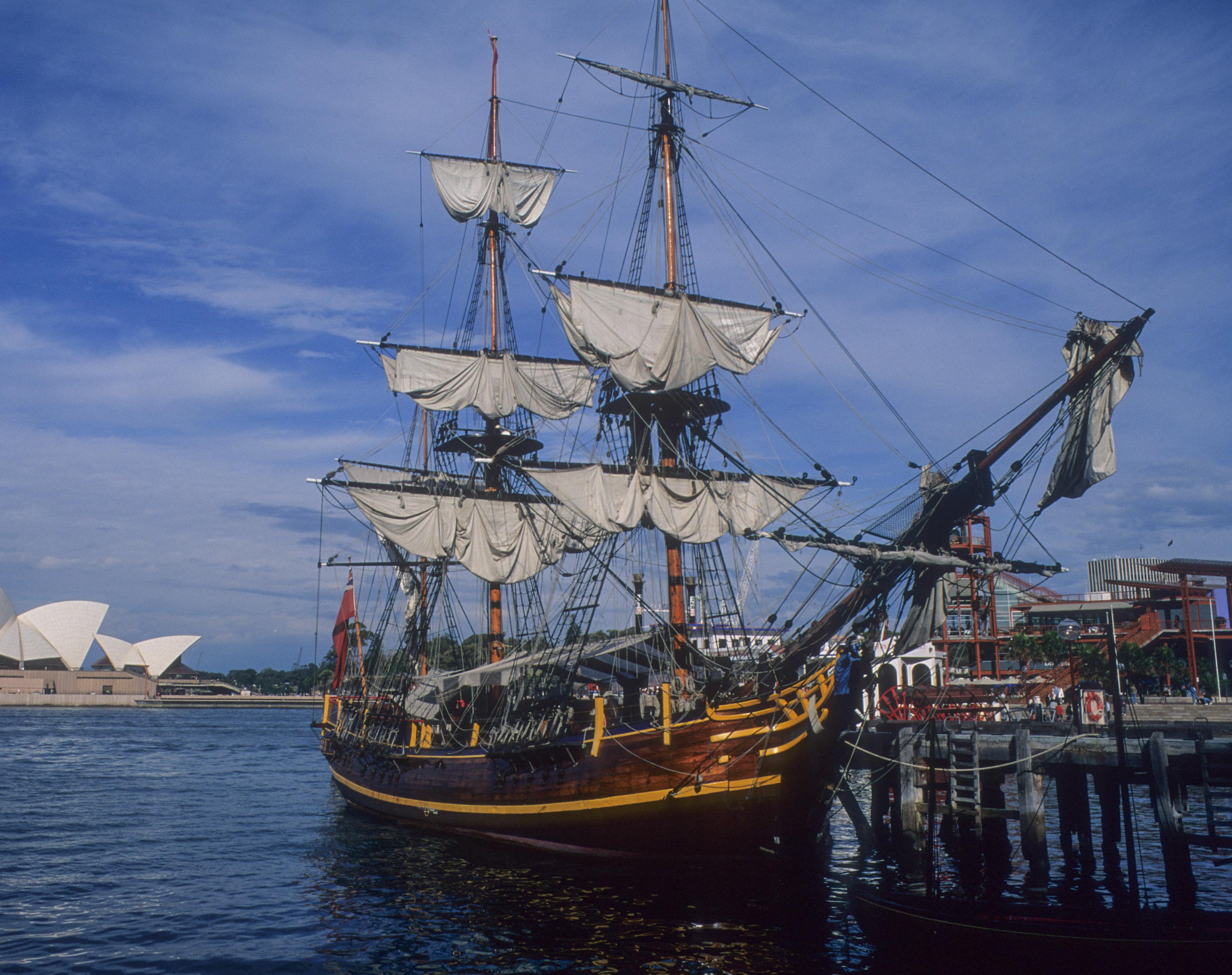
- Bounty on Sydney Harbour, Sydney, 1996

History

Hong Kong
- Owner: HKR International
- Operator: Hong Kong Resort Company
- Builder: Oceania Marine (before Whangerei Engineering & Construction Ltd) Whangarei, New Zealand
- Cost: $4,500,000
- Laid down: 1977
- Launched: 16 December 1978
- Decommissioned: 1 August 2017
- Home port: Discovery Bay (Lantau Island), New Territories, Hong Kong
- Identification: IMO number: 1001049; MMSI number: 477991091
- Status: Unknown, presumed to be in Thailand

General characteristics
- Tonnage: 247
- Displacement: 387 tonnes
- Length: 42 m (138 ft) (LOA); 30 m (98 ft) (on deck)
- Beam: 7 m (23 ft)
- Height: 33 m (108 ft)
- Decks: 3
- Sail plan: Sail area 900 m^{2} (9,700 sq ft)
- Capacity: 39
- Crew: 14

Bounty (popularly HMAV Bounty) (Note: The ship is not entitled to the use of the prefix 'HMAV' as it has never been commissioned into the Royal Navy. Here 'HMAV' is treated as part of the popular name, and not as a ship prefix.) is an enlarged reconstruction of the original 1787 Royal Navy sailing ship HMS Bounty, built in Whangarei, New Zealand in 1978 for the movie The Bounty starring Mel Gibson and Anthony Hopkins. The ship launched on 16 December 1978 and was decommissioned in 2017. Its current location is unknown.

== Design and construction ==
For the filming of The Bounty, a replica of William Bligh's ship, HMS Bounty was required. The Bounty replica was built by Whangarei Engineering Company at Whangarei, New Zealand, during 1978 and 1979. The ship was designed to externally conform to the original Bounty. The replica is 40.5 metres (133 ft) in length overall, with a beam of 8.5 metres (28 ft) and a draught of 3.8 metres (12 ft).

=== Sourced materials ===
To reflect the international legacy of the Mutiny on the Bounty, materials for the ship were sourced from across the British Commonwealth. The hull was fabricated from Australian steel, which was carvel-clad in iroko. The decking is New Zealand tanekaha. The masts and spars were made of Canadian pine, with sails made from Scottish flax, and blocks of English ash and elm. The sail plan was of a barque: some sources describe the layout as a full-rigged ship, but the ship lacks a topgallant on the mizzen-mast. The ship's mast height is 29 metres (95 ft), with a sail area of 650 square metres (7,000 sq ft). Auxiliary propulsion is provided by two 415-horsepower (309 kW) turbocharged Kelvin 8-cylinder diesel engines, which can propel the ship at 7 knots (13 km/h; 8.1 mph). The propulsion system could be activated on either side of the ship so that its effects would not spoil filming (i.e. the off-camera side).

== History ==
=== Post filming ===
The film The Bounty was completed and released in 1984. Bounty was laid up in Los Angeles until 1986, when Bounty Voyages purchased the ship. She was sailed to Vancouver, refitted, then sailed to Australia. From here, she proceeded to England via the Suez Canal to join the First Fleet Re-enactment Voyage: a historical re-enactment for the Australian Bicentenary. She left England for Australia in May 1987, and sailed with the fleet via Tenerife, Rio de Janeiro, Cape Town, Mauritius, and Fremantle before arriving in Sydney on Australia Day (26 January) 1988. Bounty was originally to be flagship of the re-creation voyage (due to the ship's similarities to HMS Sirius, flagship of the original First Fleet), but the fleet commodore instead selected Søren Larsen for the role.

For many years she served the tourist excursion market from Circular Quay, Sydney, Australia, before being sold to real estate conglomerate HKR International Limited in October 2007.

The company gave Bounty an additional name in Chinese, 濟民號 (Cantonese Jyutping: Zaimanhou; Mandarin Pinyin: Jiminhao; English: Bounty) after company founder Cha Chi Ming. For the following decade, the ship was used as a tourist attraction in Discovery Bay, on Lantau Island in Hong Kong, where it was used for harbour cruises, charters, day excursions, weddings and corporate retreats . With no publicity or explanation, HKRI decommissioned Bounty on 1 August 2017. The fate of the ship was left undisclosed.

Following this, the ship has been spotted in Phra Samut Chedi, at the mouth of the Chao Phraya River in Thailand. It was rechristened Bounty (เดอะ บาวน์ตี้).

GoogleEarth shows the ship clearly both aerially (dated 2022) and from 'Street View' (dated Oct 2020) from boats travelling up the Chao Phraya River. 13°35'06.03"N 100°34'55.52"E

== See also ==
- HMS Bounty
- Bounty (1960 ship), replica built in Canada in 1960 for the 1962 MGM film Mutiny on the Bounty.
