= One and All =

Tall ship based in Adelaide, Australia

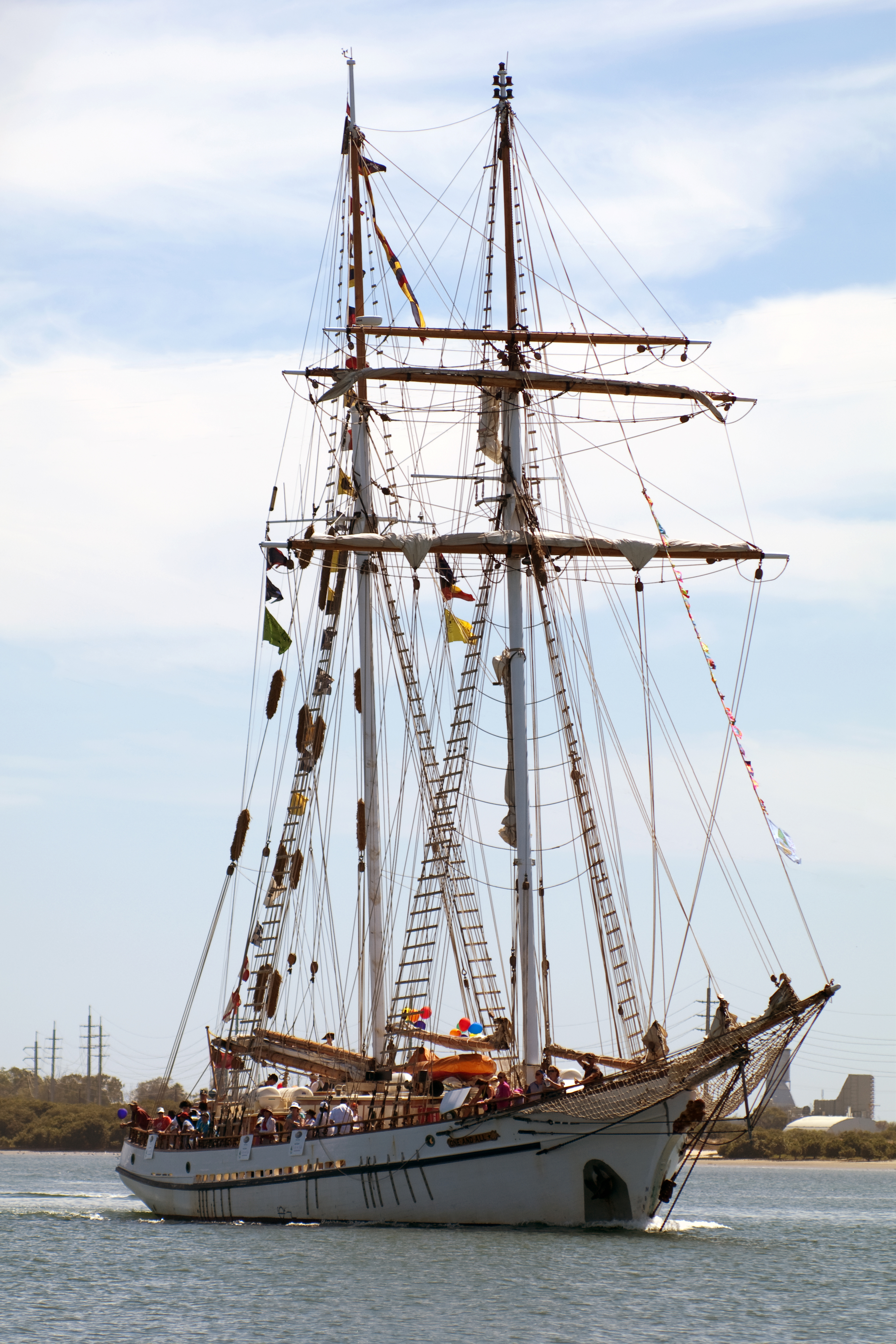
- One and All in 2010

History

Australia
- Name: One and All
- Builder: W G Porter & Son Pty Ltd
- Launched: 1985
- Commissioned: 5 April 1987
- Identification: MMSI number: 503305000; Callsign: VKON
- Status: Active

General characteristics
- Tons burthen: 206
- Length: 42.68 metres (140.0 ft)
- Beam: 8.20 metres (26.9 ft)
- Draft: 2.60 metres (8 ft 6 in) – no centerboard; 3.90 metres (12.8 ft) – with centreboard
- Propulsion: Caterpillar 6-cylinder diesel
- Sail plan: Brigantine (12 sails)
- Complement: 9 professional, 3 volunteers, 27 trainees

One and All is a tall ship based in Adelaide, and rigged for twelve sails, which are controlled by 100 lines. After being launched in 1985, she took part in the First Fleet Re-enactment Voyage as part of Australia's bicentenary celebrations, travelling from Rio de Janeiro back to Australia. She was commonly used for sail training, offering courses and voyages that last from between a few hours to many weeks, especially for youth at risk. The vessel is run by registered not for profit group Friends of One and All Sailing ship Inc. and supported by volunteers and professional crew.

== History ==
One and All was built at North Haven as part of South Australia's 150th jubilee project, and is based on a design of Postboy. As such her bowsprit, (at almost 13 metres in length), has been described as her "most distinguishing feature". The ship has since been host to youth training and mentoring programs for youth at risk, financially supported by the SA State Government and operated by Friends of One and All Sailing Ship Inc.

In 2017, One and All was one of the ships considered in a study funded by Renewal SA about "a strategy for berthing or locating historic ships and vessels within the inner harbour of Port Adelaide."

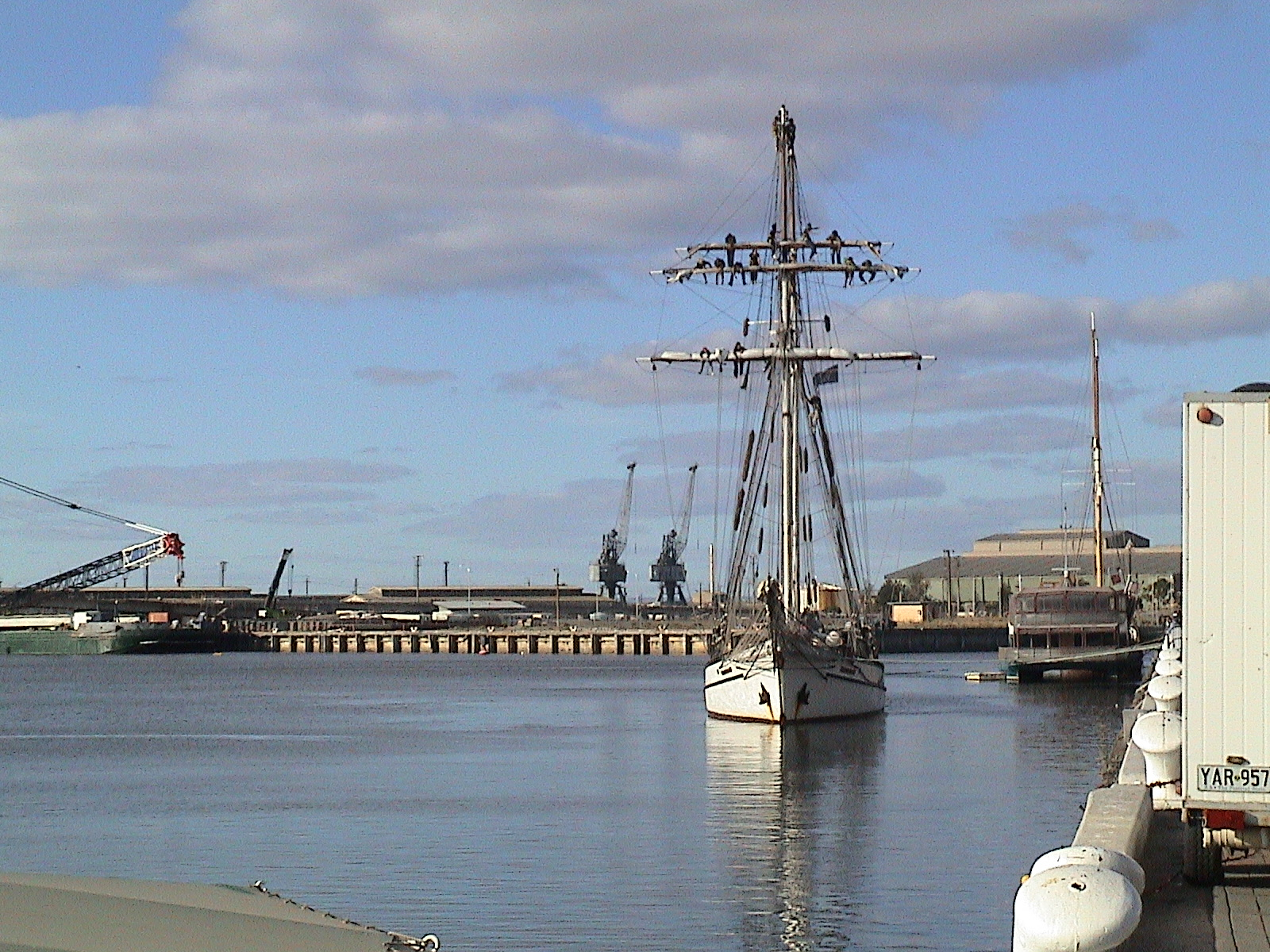
One and All with yards manned, about to moor at the McLaren Wharf, Port Adelaide

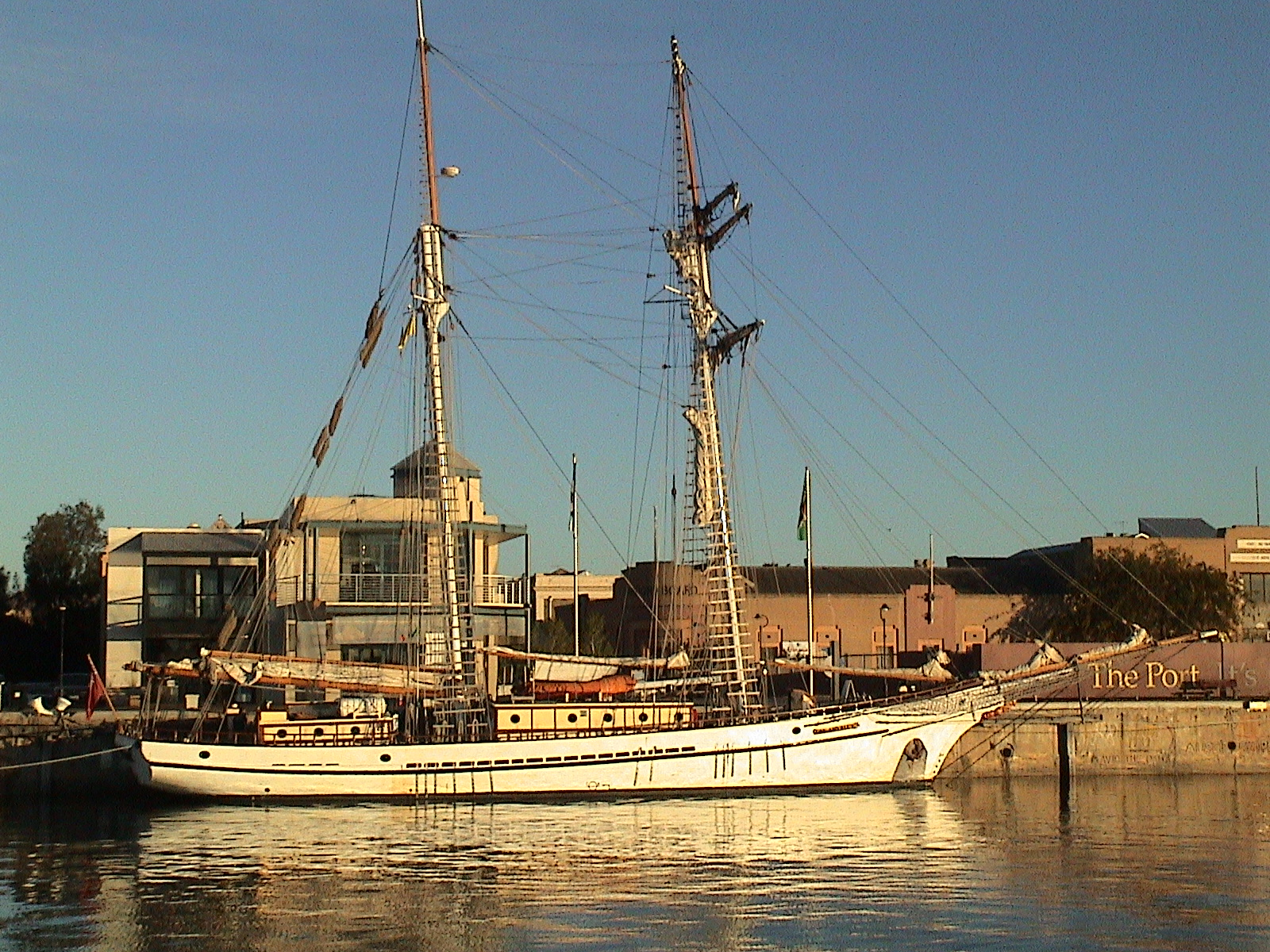
One and All, moored at the McLaren Wharf, Port Adelaide

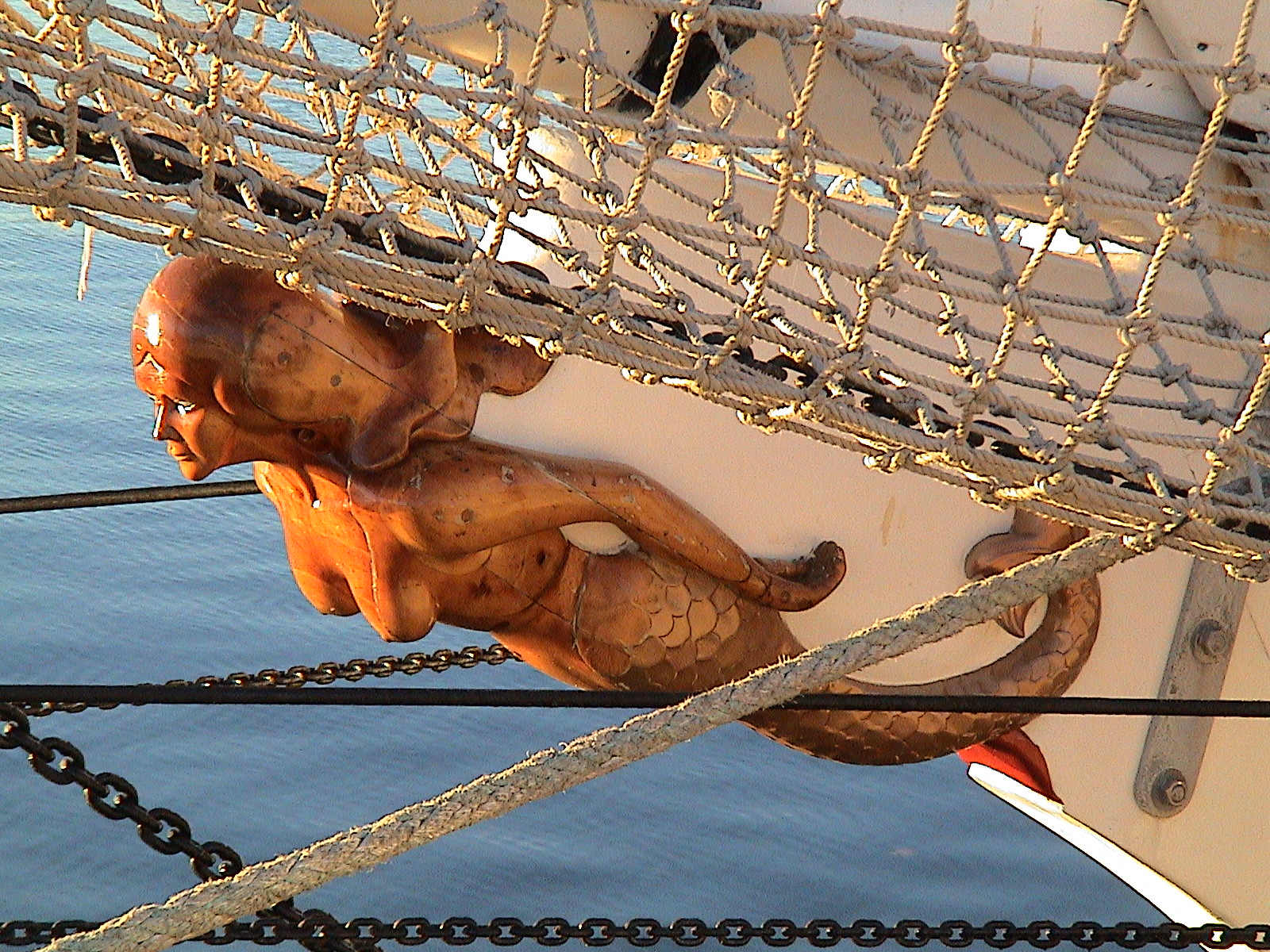
One and All's figurehead
