= Southern Swan =

Barquentine based in Australia

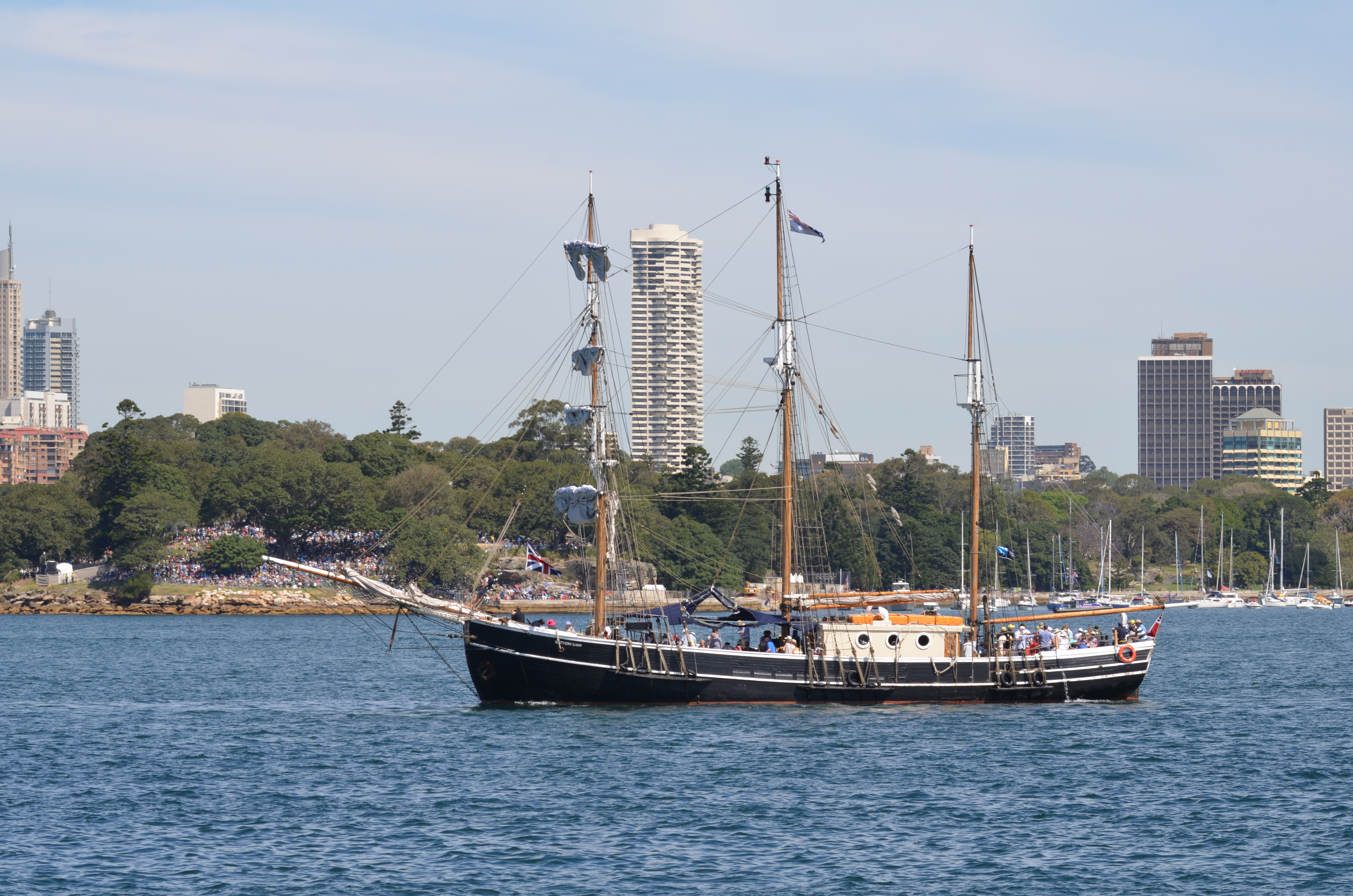
- Southern Swan during the International Fleet Review 2013

History
- Name: Mathilde (1922–1926); Pacific (1926–1930); Hans Christian Andersen (1930–1938); Svanen (1938–c. 1977); Our Svanen (c. 1977–2010); Southern Swan (2010–)
- Launched: 1922
- Identification: MMSI number: 503045810; Callsign: VNOJ
- Status: Active

General characteristics as barquentine
- Type: Three-masted barquentine
- Length: 39.6 metres (130 ft)
- Beam: 6.7 metres (22 ft)
- Height: 23.2 metres (76 ft) mast height
- Draught: 3 metres (9.8 ft)
- Propulsion: 350-horsepower (260 kW) Caterpillar 3406 diesel, 6 knots (11 km/h; 6.9 mph)
- Sail plan: Short-rigged barquentine, 502 square metres (5,400 sq ft) sail area

Southern Swan is a traditional Baltic trader, currently rigged as a three-masted barquentine. She is typical of coastal trading ships from the era 1840s to 1940s. Since the 1980s she is based in Australia.

== History ==
The ship was built in Frederikssund, Denmark in 1922. The hull was carvel-built from oak. She was rigged as a three-masted topsail schooner. The ship is 39.6 metres (130 ft) in length overall, with a beam of 6.7 metres (22 ft) and a draught of 3 metres (9.8 ft).

Initially operating under the name Mathilde, the ship was intended for trade voyages to and from Greenland. However, she spent most of her commercial career hauling grain to the Tuborg Brewery. During her career, she was renamed Pacific in 1926, Hans Christian Andersen in 1930, and Svanen (Swan) in 1938. In 1955, a 3-cylinder Alpha diesel engine was fitted to the vessel.

In the late 1960s, she was sold to a Canadian couple, who spent the next decade refitting and rebuilding the ship. By the time she resumed operations in 1977, Our Svanen had received new masts and spars, and was re-rigged as a short-rigged barquentine. At this point she had her registry changed from Dutch to British. In her new configuration, she had a mast height of 23.2 metres (76 ft), and a total sail area of 502 square metres (5,400 sq ft).

In 1978, the vessel sailed from England to the west coast of Canada. She spent the next six years operating out of Victoria, British Columbia as a training ship for the Royal Canadian Sea Cadets. The charter ended in 1986, and she was sold to C.D.A. Sail Pacific, who put Our Svanen on display at Expo '86. During 1986, the Alpha engine was replaced by a 350-horsepower (260 kW) Caterpillar 3406 diesel, which could propel the ship at 6 knots (11 km/h; 6.9 mph).

At the end of 1986, Our Svanen left Canada for England, to join the First Fleet Re-enactment Voyage: a historical re-enactment for the Australian Bicentenary. She left England for Australia in May 1987, and sailed with the fleet via Tenerife, Rio de Janeiro, Cape Town, Mauritius, and Fremantle before arriving in Sydney on Australia Day (26 January) 1988. During the stay at Mauritius, Our Svanen was re-registered as a Canadian vessel.

After the re-enactment, Our Svanen remained based in Sydney, with charters and cruises along the eastern Australian coast. In 2007, the ship was purchased by the Woods and Warne families, who formed the company Sydney Harbour Tall Ships. The vessel's name was changed to Southern Swan in 2010. The ship is used for charters, functions, and film work. In October 2013, Southern Swan participated in the International Fleet Review 2013 in Sydney, Australia.
