= Le Français (tall ship) =

Three-masted barque built in 1948

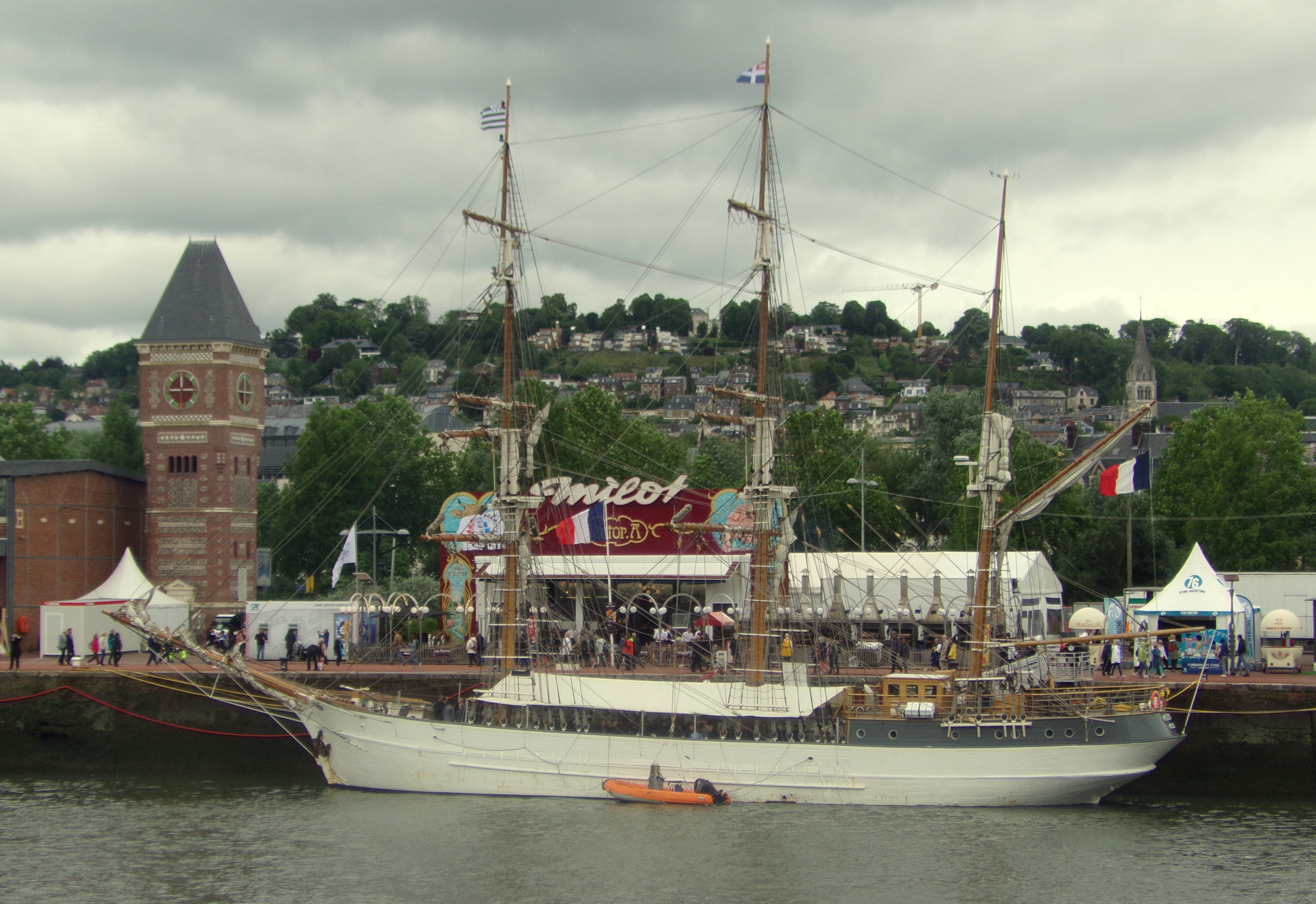
- Le Français at Rouen in 2019

History

France
- Name: Le Français
- Owner: France Armement
- Builder: J. Ring-Andersen Skibsværft, Svendborg, Denmark
- Launched: 1948
- Refit: 2013
- Home port: Saint-Malo
- Identification: IMO number: 5183120; MMSI number: 235000132; Callsign: GDQK

General characteristics
- Type: Tall ship
- Tonnage: 226 GRT
- Displacement: 450 long tons (457 t)
- Length: 153 ft (47 m) o/a; 121 ft (37 m) on deck
- Beam: 28 ft (8.5 m)
- Draught: 12 ft (3.7 m)
- Propulsion: 1 × Mitsubishi S6A3- MPTAW-3 576 hp (430 kW) diesel engine, 1 shaft
- Sail plan: 3-masted barque; 9,500 sq ft (880 m^{2}) sail area
- Boats & landing craft carried: 2 × 6 m (20 ft) Avon boats
- Capacity: 16 passengers
- Crew: 14

Le Français, formerly the Kaskelot, is a three-masted barque and one of the largest remaining wooden ships in commission.

== History ==
=== Danish flag ===
The Kaskelot was built in 1948 by J. Ring-Andersen for the Royal Greenland Trading Company, to carry supplies to remote coastal settlements in East Greenland. During the 1960s, Kaskelot worked as a support vessel for Danish fisheries in the Faroe Islands.

=== British flag ===
In 2007, for the bi-centennial celebration of Great Britain's ending the African slave trade, the ship was sailed up the Thames River to Tower Bridge in London to represent the Zong. This slave ship, its crew and cargo of slaves figured in court proceedings in 1783 and became a symbol for the nation's anti-slavery movement because of the murder of 132 slaves during the voyage.

New owners purchased the ship in 2013 and undertook an extensive 8-month refit at T. Nielsen in Gloucester during which it was upgraded to comply with MCA MLC guidelines. The ship was used for charter and commercial work around the UK.

=== French flag ===
In 2018, the Kaskelot was bought by Frédéric Lescure and brought under the French flag. She is now managed by the company Bob Escoffier Maritime. Then, the ship has been renamed Le Français, in hommage of the ship used by explorer Jean-Baptiste Charcot during his expedition in Antarctic (1903–1905).

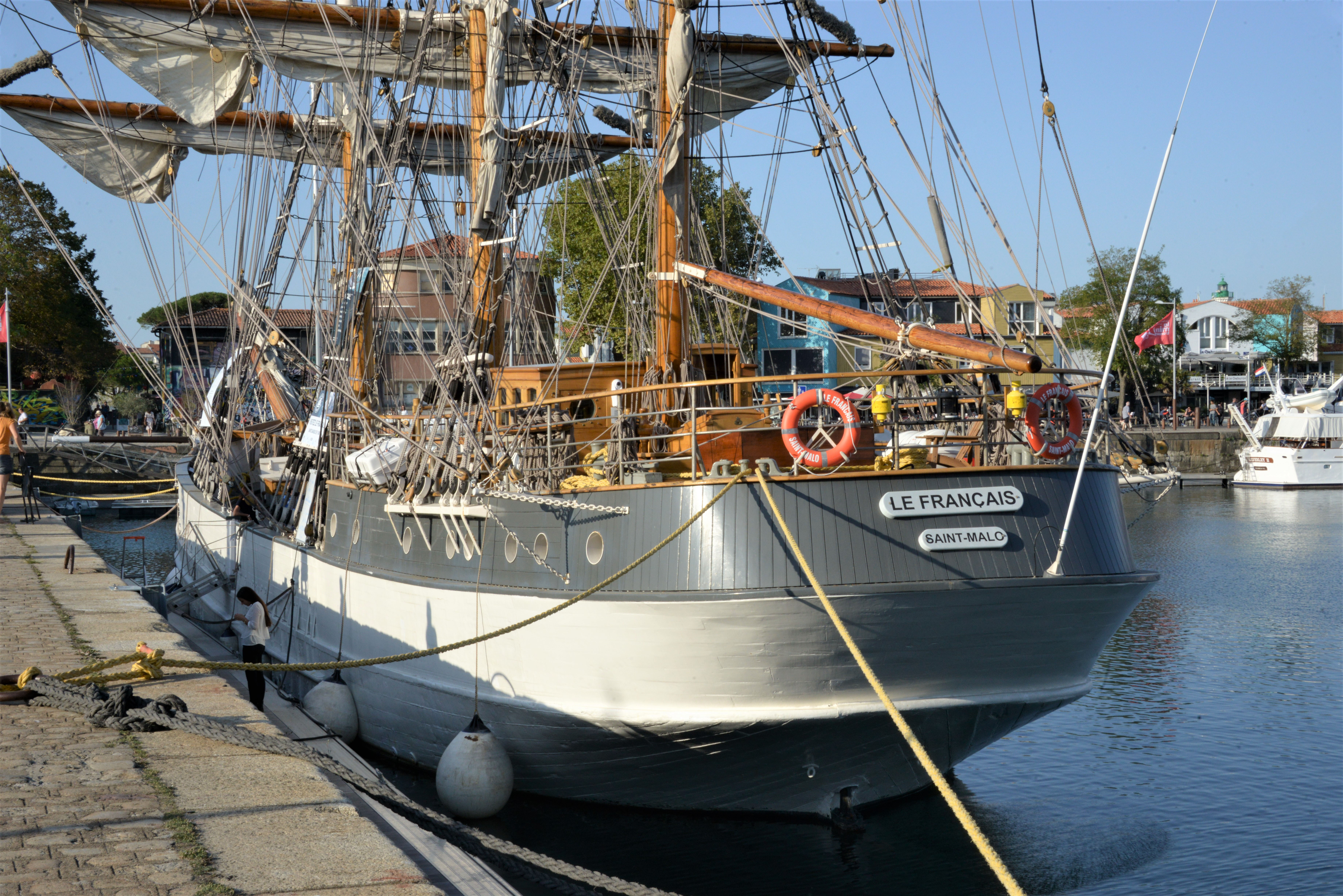
Le Français at La Rochelle in 2019

== Film credits ==
Kaskelot has appeared in the following film and television productions:

- The Last Place on Earth (1985)
- Revolution (1985)
- Return to Treasure Island (1986)
- Without a Clue (1988)
- Shipwrecked (1990)
- The Three Musketeers (1993)
- Cutthroat Island (1995)
- Swept from the Sea (1997)
- A Respectable Trade (1998)
- David Copperfield (1999)
- Longitude (2000)
- Shackleton (2002)
- Amazing Grace (2006)
- Alice in Wonderland (2010)
