= Solway Lass =

Australian two-master tall ship

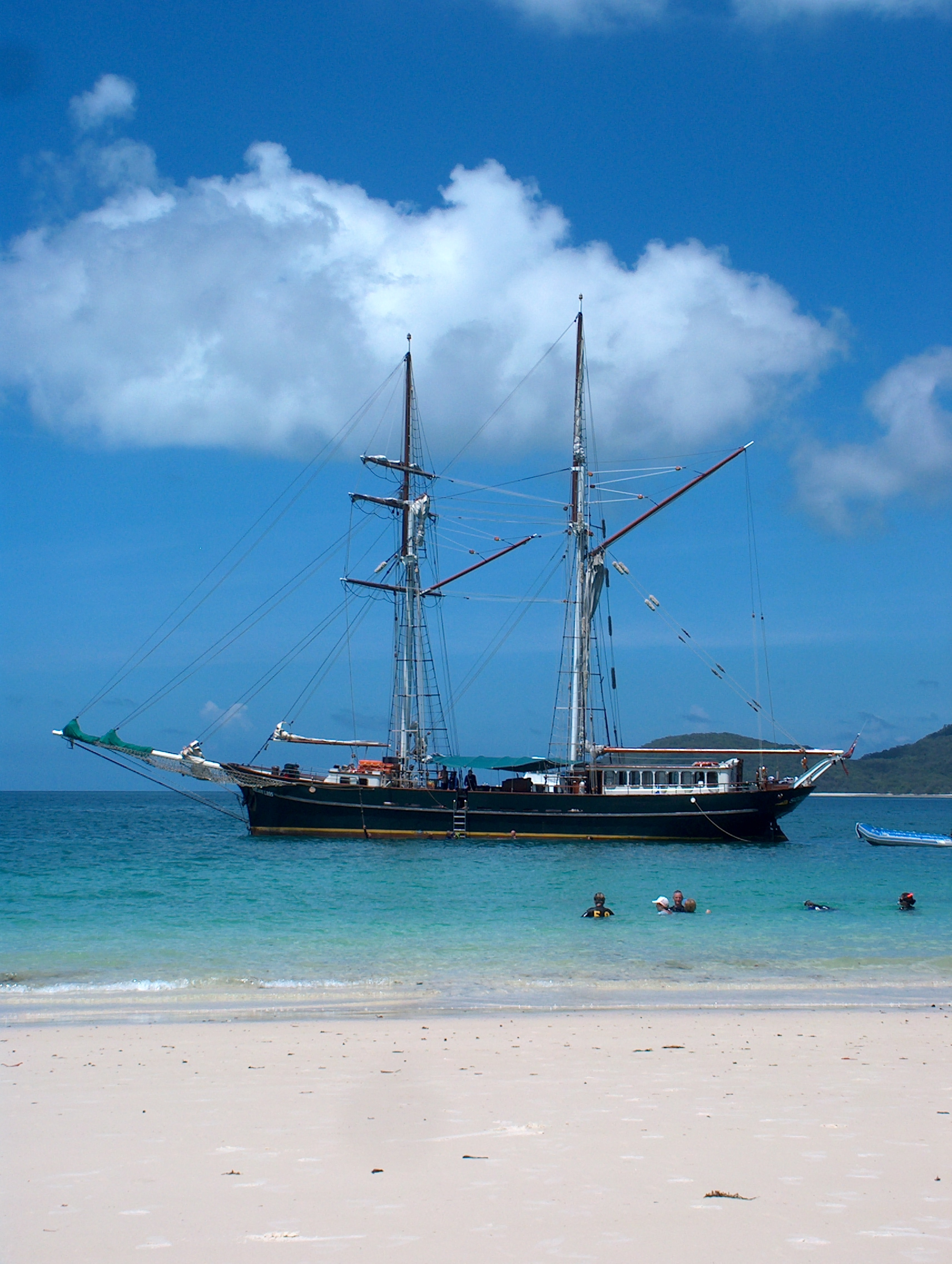

History
- Name: Stina (1902–1905); Adolf (1905–1924); Solway Lass (1924–)
- Launched: 1902
- Identification: IMO number: 5344736

General characteristics
- Sail plan: Schooner

Solway Lass is a two-masted schooner. She was built in the Netherlands in 1902 and is currently operated out of Airlie Beach, Australia as a holiday sailor in the Whitsunday Islands.

== History ==
The ship, originally named Stina, was built out of German steel with timber decking as a sail powered cargo vessel.

In 1905, she was sold and renamed Adolf, working in and around the Baltic and North seas. In 1915, she was seized as a prize of war by the British Royal Navy and used as a Q-Ship during World War I. After the war, she worked as a coal, produce and stone carrying vessel between Liverpool and Scotland. She was sold to a Scottish firm in 1924 in the Solway Firth, where she was renamed Solway Lass.

When World War II broke out, Nazi Germany's Kriegsmarine seized Solway Lass and used her as a supply ship. She hit a mine and was badly damaged during the war; but she was repaired by the Germans to serve as a sail-powered icebreaker. After WWII, Solway Lass served in the South Pacific as a cargo vessel. A Sydney businessman purchased her in Fiji in 1983 and rebuilt her. She took part in the 1st Fleet re-enactment of the Tall Ships in Sydney Harbour in 1988. Solway Lass was purchased in 1999 by Australian Tall Ship Cruises and sailed from Sydney to the Whitsunday Islands arriving in the Whitsundays in February 1999. After an extensive refurbishment Solway Lass went to sea as a live-aboard charter yacht providing three night cruises around the Whitsundays Islands.

In April 2002, the owners and crew of Australian Tall Ship Cruises celebrated with a 100th birthday for Solway Lass in the Whitsundays.
