= Cabin Fever (TV series) =

- Presented by: Derek Mooney
- Country of origin: Ireland
- No. of seasons: 1

Production
- Running time: 60 minutes

Original release
- Network: RTÉ
- Release: 3 June 2003

Cabin Fever is an RTÉ reality TV show which was meant to have been broadcast over eight weeks starting on 3 June 2003.

Cabin Fever consisted of a group of eleven contestants chosen specially for the show, most of whom had no sailing experience (though they had received a quick course in sailing technique prior to setting sail), who were to be put on the 27.4 metre (90 foot), two-masted schooner with a professional crew of two. The wind-powered sailing ship would then sail around the Irish coast. Each week one contestant was scheduled to quite literally "walk the plank" after being voted off the ship by TV viewers. The final surviving contestant was to be considered the winner and would receive €100,000.

Disaster struck however two weeks into the broadcast when, on Friday 13 June 2003, the ship ran aground off Tory Island off the north-west coast near County Donegal.

The show was named after cabin fever, the claustrophobic reaction that takes place when a person or group is isolated and/or shut in a small space, with nothing to do, for an extended period.

== The ships ==
The Cabin Fever was built in 1947 in France. It was heavily refurbished for the programme.

The Cabin Fever II was brought from Dartmouth. It was registered as the Johanna Lucretia.

== The contestants ==
The contestants — six men and five women — were selected from among 6,724 applicants.

Placings:

1. Elaine Power (30), Dunmore East, County Waterford
2. Cat Sheridan (26), Midleton
3. Fiona McGonnell (29), Cavan
4. David Yaffe (29), Rathfarnham
5. Andrew Fowler (27), Dublin
6. Marie Walsh (45), Castleisland, County Kerry
7. Lee Gooch (30), Letterkenny
8. Ciara Dunne (23), Carlow
9. Stevie Greene (43), Limerick
10. Nuala Carey (36), Dublin
11. Noel Hogan (27), Ennis (quit on July 3rd)

== The show ==
=== Disaster ===
Disaster struck however two weeks into the broadcast when, on 13 June 2003, the ship ran aground off Tory Island, a small island off the north-west coast near County Donegal. All the 9 remaining contestants (Note: One contestant of the original ten had already "walked the plank" the previous week.) and two crew were rescued by the nearby Arranmore Lifeboat, but the wooden sailing ship broke up on the rocks. Ironically the accident was not filmed by the RTÉ film crew; they had left the ship some hours earlier to catch some sleep after 15 hours continuous filming. The incident was however filmed by a local man who happened to have been recording the schooner's movements at the moment she ran aground. The Irish media made much tongue-in-cheek mention of the fact that the disaster occurred on Friday the 13th, a date often linked to supposed curses and disasters and also the fact that the ship's name had been changed for the programme: sailing lore suggests that any ship which is renamed prior to setting sail will meet with disaster.

Stuart Switzer, a Coco Television Productions producer responsible for the programme said:

“The back of the boat has broken. It is actually in two pieces, and the waves are knocking the planks and timber around. There is debris all over the water and all over the shore.”

=== Aftermath ===
RTÉ and the programme makers, Coco TV, announced that all money earned from phone-in votes in the previous week (and which, due to the disaster, would not now lead to some contestant leaving the ship on 16 June as planned), would be donated to the Royal National Lifeboat Institution, which supplies lifeboat coverage around the Irish coast.

RTÉ and Coco TV hired a second boat. The captain, Peter Culleton, was replaced and the show began again, though three of the original team declined to come back. They were replaced by two new contestants. The series was further hit when the boat experienced engine trouble and required a new gearbox but the problem was ultimately solved. Partly due to the controversies, the series regularly topped the TAM ratings on RTÉ.

=== Reaction ===
Barry Andrews, a politician from the then governing Fianna Fáil party, questioned "the wisdom of sending out 11 people with no sailing experience with just two qualified sailors." He said the destruction of the ship "shows that so-called reality television has gone too far, with people being asked to carry out challenges that are too dangerous."

=== Report ===
Almost two years later, in March 2005, a report on the ship's sinking was published by the Marine Casualty Investigation Board. The report stated that the schooner breached its operating licence and had no effective watchkeeping. It also found that the contestants were fatigued at the time of the accident.
