= Return to Treasure Island (TV series) =

- DVD cover
- Genre: Adventure
- Written by: Robert S. Baker; Ivor Dean; John Goldsmith
- Directed by: Piers Haggard; Alex Kirby
- Starring: Brian Blessed; Christopher Guard; Reiner Schöne; Deborah Poplett; Peter Lloyd; Kenneth Colley; Dicken Ashworth; Donald Pickering; Artro Morris; Bruce Purchase; Peter Copley; Richard Beale; Morgan Shepherd; Nick Brimble
- Composers: Tom McGuinness; Terry Oldfield
- Country of origin: United Kingdom
- Original language: English
- No. of seasons: 1
- No. of episodes: 10

Production
- Executive producer: Patrick Dromgoole
- Producer: Alan Clayton
- Production locations: Glen Usk, Newport, Newport, Wales, UK; Jamaica; Tabernas, Almería, Andalucía, Spain
- Cinematography: Tony Impey
- Editors: Tim Wallis; Mike Hopkins; Roger Mitchell; Geoff Shepherd
- Camera setup: Robin Higginson
- Running time: 101 minutes (per episode); 115 minutes (2 episodes); 55 minutes (6 episodes)
- Production companies: Harlech Television (HTV); Primetime Television Ltd. Walt Disney Pictures

Original release
- Network: ITV (United Kingdom); The Disney Channel (United States)
- Release: 5 July – 23 August 1986

Return to Treasure Island is a 1986 Disney HTV TV series, starring Brian Blessed as Long John Silver, Christopher Guard as Jim Hawkins and Kenneth Colley as Ben Gunn.

Disney Channel contracted the UK ITV broadcaster HTV Wales, part of Harlech Television Group, to produce the series, and it was shot in Wales, Spain and Jamaica. It was written by John Goldsmith, and directed by Piers Haggard and Alex Kirby. HTV Wales had already produced other Robert Louis Stevenson books for television, namely Kidnapped in 1979 and The Master of Ballantrae in 1984 and producer Patrick Dromgoole would go on to helm Treasure Island. Their expertise in making these productions was used when Disney chose to work with HTV to produce a series, in 10 parts.

== Plot ==
The story begins 10 years after the original Treasure Island adventure. Jim Hawkins returns home to The Admiral Benbow Inn after graduating at Oxford University. His mother has laid on a surprise party, including as guests his old friends, Squire Trelawney, Dr Livesey, Captain Smollett and Ben Gunn. At the same time, a small rowing boat is beached at night with its only occupant, Long John Silver. Trelawney has been communicating with Jim Hawkins during his time at Oxford, and has appointed him agent to his plantations in Jamaica because of their failure to make any profits in the last year. Trelawny's announcement of Jim's impending departure shocks Hawkins mother. She reels, and catches sight of John Silver at the window. A search of the area reveals nothing, but later that night Silver appears in Jim's bedroom and demands the map of Treasure Island. Hawkins thinks it's worthless, but Silver believes that a hoard of precious stones is still buried on the island, worth four times the gold previously found. They go downstairs to retrieve the map. Silver's accomplices appear and want to burn the inn to the ground, with everybody inside, to eliminate all witnesses. Silver changes sides to protect Jim, but he is later caught and put on trial for piracy and murder. He is convicted and sentenced to death. Hawkins rides to London and gets the sentence commuted to transportation. He and Silver sail on the Saracen to the West Indies. On board, they meet Dutchman Hans Van Der Brecken, Reverend Morgan and the beautiful Isabella, daughter of the Grandee of Spain.

During the voyage, Silver escapes his shackles, throws the sea cook overboard and claims the position for himself. He then persuades the crew and other captives to commit mutiny and they take the ship, only to find that Hawkins and Van Der Brecken are against them. During their parley, the Spanish attack the ship. The crew and mutineers must fight together to save themselves. Silver takes Isabella hostage and confiscates a long boat with Hawkins, Van Der Brecken, and Morgan on board and they row to safety. After many adventures, they arrive on Jamaica. There, Hawkins discovers that the plantation manager is defrauding Trelawney by selling molasses on the black market. They also discover that he is in league with the Governor to steal the map of Treasure Island and claim the treasure that is left there. Many adventures follow which culminate in everybody converging on Treasure Island for a final battle.

== Episode list ==
- Ep.1 - The Map
- Ep.2 - Mutiny
- Ep.3 - Island of the Damned
- Ep.4 - Jamaica
- Ep.5 - Manhunt
- Ep.6 - The Crow's Nest
- Ep.7 - Fugitives
- Ep.8 - In Chains
- Ep.9 - Spanish Gold
- Ep.10 - Treasure Island

== Production notes ==
The script was developed over a long period: Ivor Dean played Silver in the successful 1966 miniseries Treasure Island and wanted to continue this with a sequel miniseries. Together with writer Robert S. Baker, he developed a story, but it had to be shelved after Dean’s death in 1974. It was ultimately adapted into this miniseries.

The final close-ups of Long John Silver rowing away from Jim Hawkins' ship and revealing that he had stolen all the diamonds from the treasure casket (inside a secret compartment of his crutch) were filmed on the roof of HTV's Pontcanna Studio (since demolished) in Cardiff.

The tall ship Kaskelot was used for the filming of the series.

== Music ==
Music for the series was composed by Terry Oldfield and Tom McGuinness. Oldfield had produced work for the BBC previously as well as playing flutes on a number of Mike Oldfield records, his younger brother. The theme music was released on 7-inch single, though slightly different from the television version. Also included were two tracks on Side B, "Isabella" and "Island of Dreams". These were extended versions on the single of themes which re-occur throughout the series.

== Home media ==
The series was aired in 1986 and shortly afterwards, was released on video. However, the format was very much edited but later releases returned to the full ten-episode format. The series did not appear on DVD until Network Releasing produced a three-disc set which was released on 26 May 2008. It was not digitally reworked, so it retains its original appearance.

== Cast ==
- Brian Blessed as Long John Silver
- Christopher Guard as Jim Hawkins
- Reiner Schöne as Hans Van Der Brecken
- Deborah Poplett as Lady Isabella
- Peter Lloyd as Abed Jones
- Kenneth Colley as Ben Gunn
- Dicken Ashworth as Gaines
- Donald Pickering as Joshua Hallows
- Artro Morris as Rev. Morgan
- Bruce Purchase as Squire Trelawney
- Peter Copley as Dr. Livesey
- Richard Beale as Capt. Alexander Smollett
- W. Morgan Sheppard as Sam Boakes
- Nick Brimble as Keelhaul
