= Evening Standard British Film Awards 2008 =

The 2008 Evening Standard British Film Awards, held on 4 February 2008 honoured the best British and Irish films of 2007.

== Best Film ==
Control

  - Atonement (Joe Wright)
  - Blue Blood (Stevan Riley)
  - Hallam Foe (David Mackenzie)
  - It’s a Free World... (Ken Loach)

== Best Actor ==
Daniel Day-Lewis - There Will Be Blood

  - Jamie Bell (Hallam Foe)
  - Jim Broadbent (And When did You Last See Your Father?)
  - Gabriel Byrne (Jindabyne)
  - James McAvoy (Atonement / Becoming Jane)
  - Sam Riley (Control)

== Best Actress ==
Helena Bonham Carter - Sweeney Todd / Conversations with Other Women

  - Julie Christie (Away from Her)
  - Romola Garai (Atonement)
  - Keira Knightley (Atonement)
  - Samantha Morton (Control)
  - Tilda Swinton (Michael Clayton)

== Best Film Score ==
Jonny Greenwood - There Will Be Blood

  - Glen Hansard & Marketa Irglova (Once)
  - Jocelyn Pook (Brick Lane)
  - John Murphy and Underworld (Sunshine)

== Most Promising Newcomer ==
John Carney - writer/director of Once

  - Amy Carson (The Magic Flute)
  - Matthew Beard (And When did You Last See Your Father?)
  - Saoirse Ronan (Atonement)
  - Kierston Wareing (It’s a Free World...)

== Best Screenplay ==
Matt Greenhalgh - Control

  - Christopher Hampton (Atonement)
  - Ronald Harwood (The Diving Bell and the Butterfly)
  - Neil Hunter & Tom Hunsinger (Sparkle)
  - Steven Knight (Amazing Grace / Eastern Promises)
  - Paul Laverty (It’s a Free World...)
  - Harold Pinter (Sleuth)

== Technical Achievement ==
Atonement (cinematographer Seamus McGarvey, production designer Sarah Greenwood, costume designer Jacqueline Durran)

- Roger Deakins cinematographer (The Assassination **of Jesse James by the Coward Robert Ford / No Country for Old Men)
- Chris Gill editor (Sunshine / 28 Weeks Later)
- Alwin H. Kuchler cinematographer (Sunshine)
- Giles Nuttgens cinematographer (Hallam Foe)

== Alexander Walker Award ==
Julie Christie
