= Tradewind (schooner) =

1911 Dutch tall ship

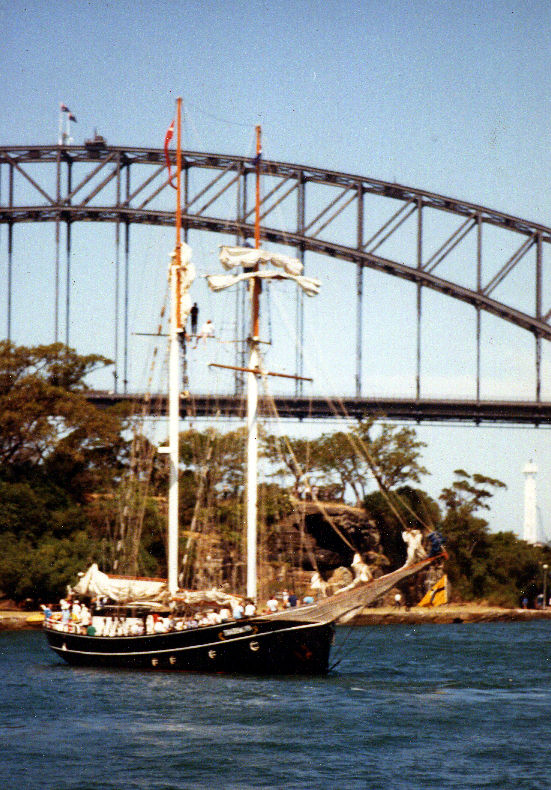
- SV Tradewind in Sydney Harbour 1990

History

Netherlands
- Name: Sophie Theresia
- Builder: Van der Vuijk shipyard, Capelle aan den IJssel, Netherlands
- Launched: 1911
- Renamed: 1952, to Aaltje en Willem
- Fate: Sold to New Zealand owner in 1986
- Notes: Initially a herring lugger, later used as a coastal trader

New Zealand
- Acquired: By New Zealander Mark Hammond in 1986
- Renamed: Tradewind
- Fate: Sold to Finnish owner in 1993
- Notes: Used for charter voyages in the South Pacific

Finland
- Acquired: By Christian Johansson of Finland in 1993
- Fate: Sold to Dutch owner in 1998
- Notes: Used for charter voyages in the Baltic Sea and North Sea

Netherlands
- Acquired: By Dutchman Kees Rol in 1998
- Renamed: 1998, to Sodade
- Acquired: By Dutchman private owner in 2004
- Renamed: 2004, back to Tradewind
- Acquired: By Dutchman Floris de Waard in 2014
- Status: Currently being rebuilt under RH class.

General characteristics
- Type: herring lugger, later topsail schooner
- Tonnage: 195 tons (displacement)
- Length: 37 metres (121 ft)
- Beam: 6.85 metres (22.5 ft)
- Draft: 2.95 metres (9 ft 8 in)
- Propulsion: Caterpillar 3408 diesel: 440 shp

Tradewind is a Dutch topsail schooner. She was built in the Netherlands in 1911 as a herring lugger named Sophie Theresia.

Sophie Theresia was built in 1911 by Van der Vuijk shipyard, Capelle aan den IJssel, Netherlands. She is 37 metres (121 ft) in length overall, with a beam of 6.6 metres (22 ft), and a draught of 2.9 metres (9 ft 6 in). The hull was constructed from riveted steel plates, with wooden decking and ketch rigging. The vessel originally operated out of Katwijk, fishing the North Sea. An engine was fitted in the 1930s. The vessel was refitted for cargo carrying in 1957, with hold hatches widened and a new engine fitted. She was renamed Aaltje en Willem, and carried cargo between the Netherlands and several small North Sea ports.

In the 1970s, the ship was taken out of service. She was initially converted into a houseboat. In 1979, ownership changed hands, and Aaltje en Willem was refitted into a steel-decked schooner. She reentered service in 1984, but there was only occasional charter work over the next two years. In 1986, the ship was sold again, to New Zealander Mark Hammond. The ship was re-rigged as a gaff-rig square-topsail schooner. On completion, the ship had a mast height of 31.1 metres (102 ft), and a sail area of 530 square metres (5,700 sq ft). Renamed Tradewind, but retaining her Dutch registry, the ship sailed in early 1987 to England to join the First Fleet Re-enactment Voyage: a historical re-enactment for the Australian Bicentenary. She left England for Australia in May 1987, and sailed with the fleet via Tenerife, Rio de Janeiro, Cape Town, Mauritius, and Fremantle before arriving in Sydney on Australia Day (26 January) 1988.

Tradewind remained in the South Pacific during the late 1980s and early 1990s, based in New Zealand. She was used for charter cruises to the subantarctic islands south of New Zealand, the Antarctic Peninsula and around Fiji. During this period, she appeared in the romance adventure film Return to the Blue Lagoon. Returning from one of the voyages to the subantarctic islands, Tradewind ran into a storm south of New Zealand and was struck by a rogue wave. The radar, situated 14 metres (46 ft) above the waterline, was carried away and the charthouse was flooded. The ship was knocked down, with the mastheads in the water, but righted itself. Only one crew member, the helmsman, was on deck at the time the wave struck. He saved himself from being washed overboard by thrusting his arms through the spokes of the wheel, although he was injured.

In late 1991, Tradewind left New Zealand to sail around Cape Horn to join the tall ship fleet sailing from Europe to America in commemoration of the 500th anniversary of Christopher Columbus's arrival in the Americas. During the voyage to join the tall ship fleet, she visited the Antarctic Peninsula and the Falkland Islands. After the Columbus celebrations in 1992, Tradewind returned to England, where she was sold to a Finnish owner. She was used for charter cruises around the Baltic Sea and the North Sea.

In 1998, Tradewind was sold to a Dutch owner and renamed Sodade. She was refitted and used for charter cruises in the Cape Verde Islands. By 2003, the condition of the ship had deteriorated and she was laid up in the island of Sal. In late 2003, she was taken over by another Dutch owner to save her from a horrible fate on the Cape Verde Islands. She was sailed to and refitted in the Canary Islands. After this refit, she was renamed Tradewind again. In early 2004, the ship made an Atlantic crossing to the Caribbean, and return via the Azores, the Baltic and eventually back to the Netherlands

In 2006 under the care of Stichting Loggerbehoud Nederland a complete refit started again. She was going to be rebuilt under RH class for worldwide service, but the project was abandoned. In 2014 Dutch shipmaster Floris de Waard bought what remained of the Tradewind.

== See also ==
- List of schooners
