= Johanna Lucretia =

1945 British tall ship

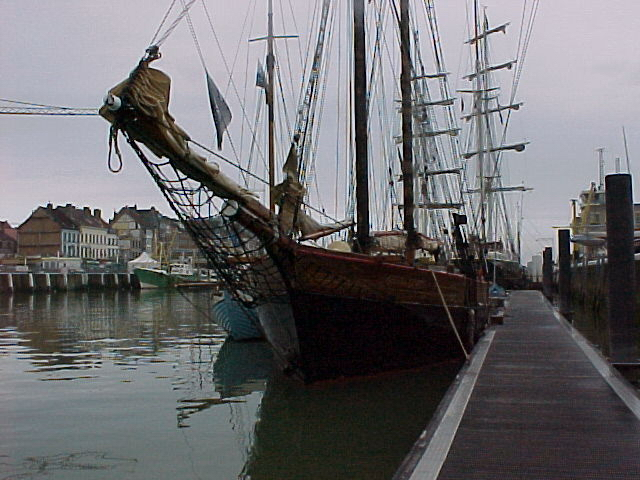

History

United Kingdom
- Name: Johanna Lucretia
- Builder: Rhoos Shipyard, Ghent, Belgium
- Laid down: 1945
- Home port: Plymouth
- Identification: MMSI number: 235074143; Callsign: MLFB3

General characteristics
- Tonnage: 50.75GT
- Length: 29.26 metres
- Beam: 5.5 metres
- Draught: 2.8 metres
- Propulsion: 150 HP Beta Marine
- Sail plan: Topsail Schooner
- Complement: 16

The Johanna Lucretia is a British tall ship and is an oak wooden two masted topsail schooner built at the Rhoos Shipyard, Ghent in Belgium in 1945. The Johanna Lucretia measures 29.26m in length, her beam is 5.50m, her draught is 2.8m and she has a total sail area of 380 m2.

Although originally built as a fishing vessel, the Johanna Lucretia was never used for that purpose and was converted for recreational use in 1954, by the then owner Ber van Meer. She sailed in Dutch waters until 1989 from her port in Enkhuizen in the Netherlands. In 1989 the Johanna Lucretia was sold and transferred her base to Plymouth in the United Kingdom under the ownership of Mrs. Heather Henning.

In 1991/1992 she was refitted in Gloucester at the Tommy Nielson Yard and was used for charter mainly from Gibraltar, the Caribbean and the Eastern coast of the United States until 2001, after which she was sold to Cutlass Classic Charters Ltd.

The Johanna Lucretia was seized by British Waterways for non-payment of dues at Gloucester Docks and, although there was interest to form a Johanna Lucretia Sailing Trust, she was purchased for private use and was to remain in Gloucester Docks during the winter months of 2008–09 while undergoing a refit. In September 2018 she was purchased by The Island Trust.

Johanna Lucretia now operates as a sail training vessel in Plymouth under the ownership of the charity, The Island Trust. She underwent an extensive refit in 2023 which included a new engine, hull work and new tanks with work carried out by Stirling's & Sons at the No.1 Covered slipway in Plymouth.

Sailing from her base in Plymouth, Johanna Lucretia operates in the South West taking young people on life changing sail training voyages and also provides the occasional adult voyage. She is currently the only British flagged Topsail Schooner in commercial operation.

Filming Background:

The Johanna Lucretia has starred in the film The Riddle of the Sands in 1978 when she took the part of the Medusa and more recently in the film Amazing Grace - a drama about William Wilberforce's campaign to end the slave trade. She also starred in the Irish reality TV show Cabin Fever where she replaced the original Cabin Fever ship after it ran aground off Tory Island.

In recent years, the vessel was used in a National Geographic production covering the history of pirates. Many of the scenes were filmed on the vessel in Plymouth Sound.

Johanna Lucretia has also hosted various dignitaries and a member of the Royal Family, Princess Anne.

Johanna Lucretia was the 2012 Tall Ship Races Class B Overall winner on corrected time.

== Gallery ==
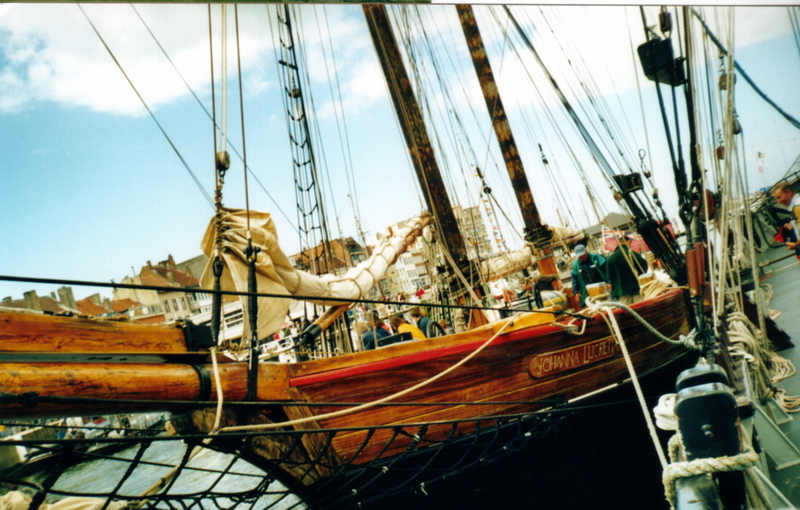

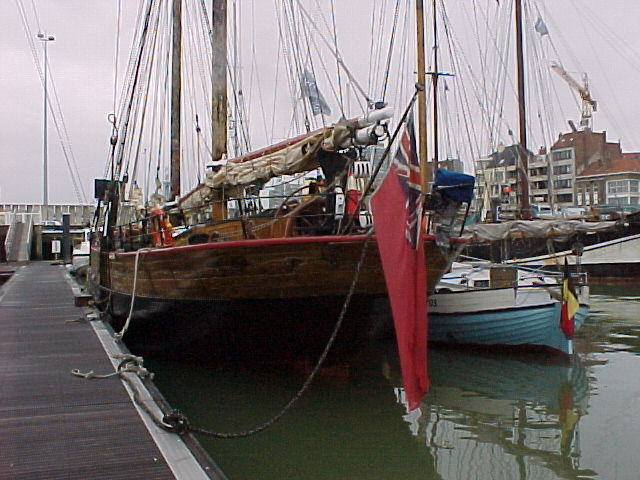

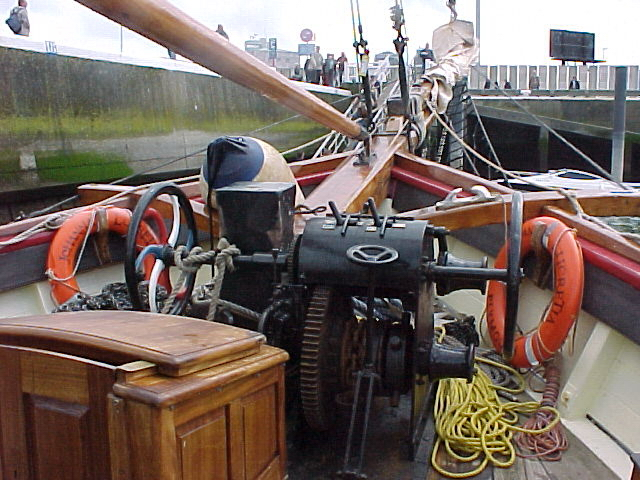

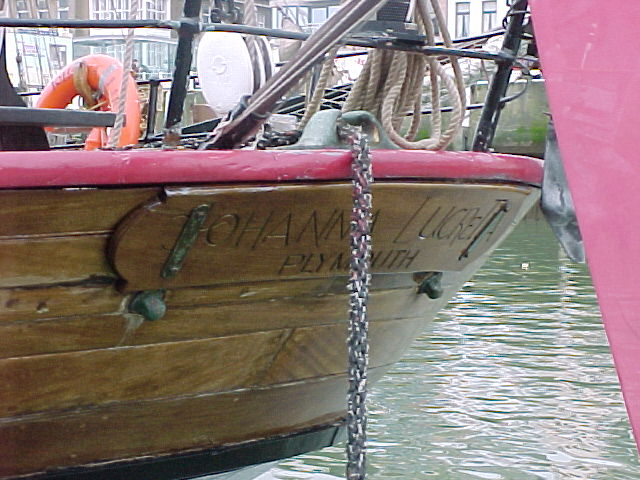

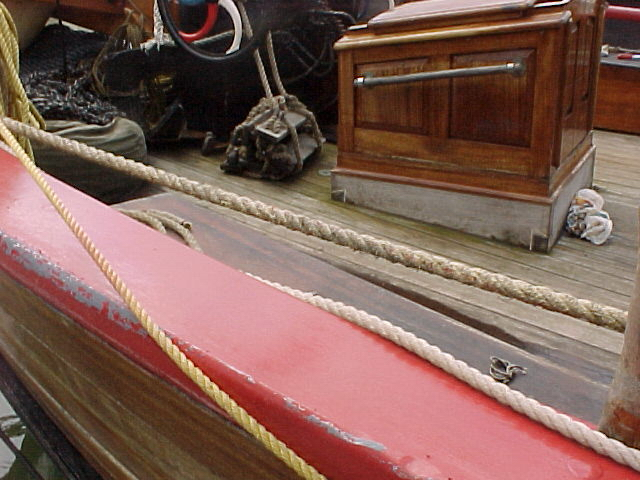

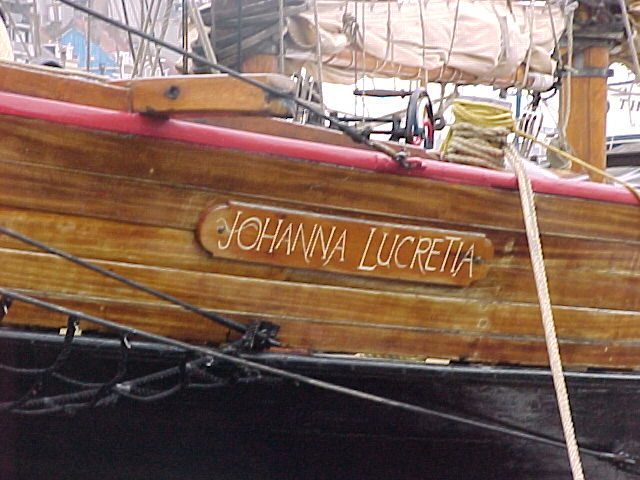

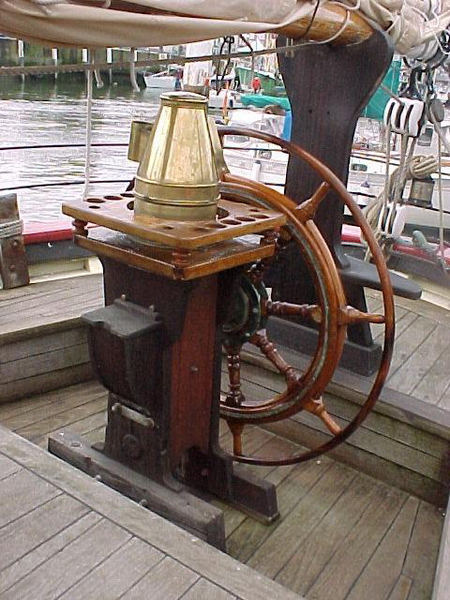

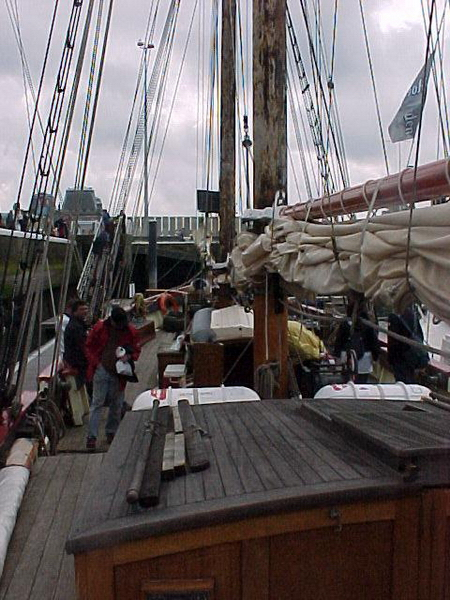
