= Topsides =

The topsides on a boat, ship, watercraft, or floating production storage and offloading (FPSO) vessel, is that part of the hull between the waterline and the deck. It includes the visible parts of the bow, stern, sheer, and, if present, tumblehome.

On an offshore oil platform, topsides refers to the upper half of the structure, above the sea level, outside the splash zone, on which equipment is installed. This includes the oil production plant, the accommodation block and the drilling rig. They are often modular in design and so can be changed out if necessary allowing expensive platforms to be more readily updated with newer technology. It contrasts with the jacket structure, which constitutes the lower half of the platform structure (the supporting legs and lattice framework), partly submerged in sea.
