= Søren Larsen (ship) =

Brigantine built 1949 in Denmark

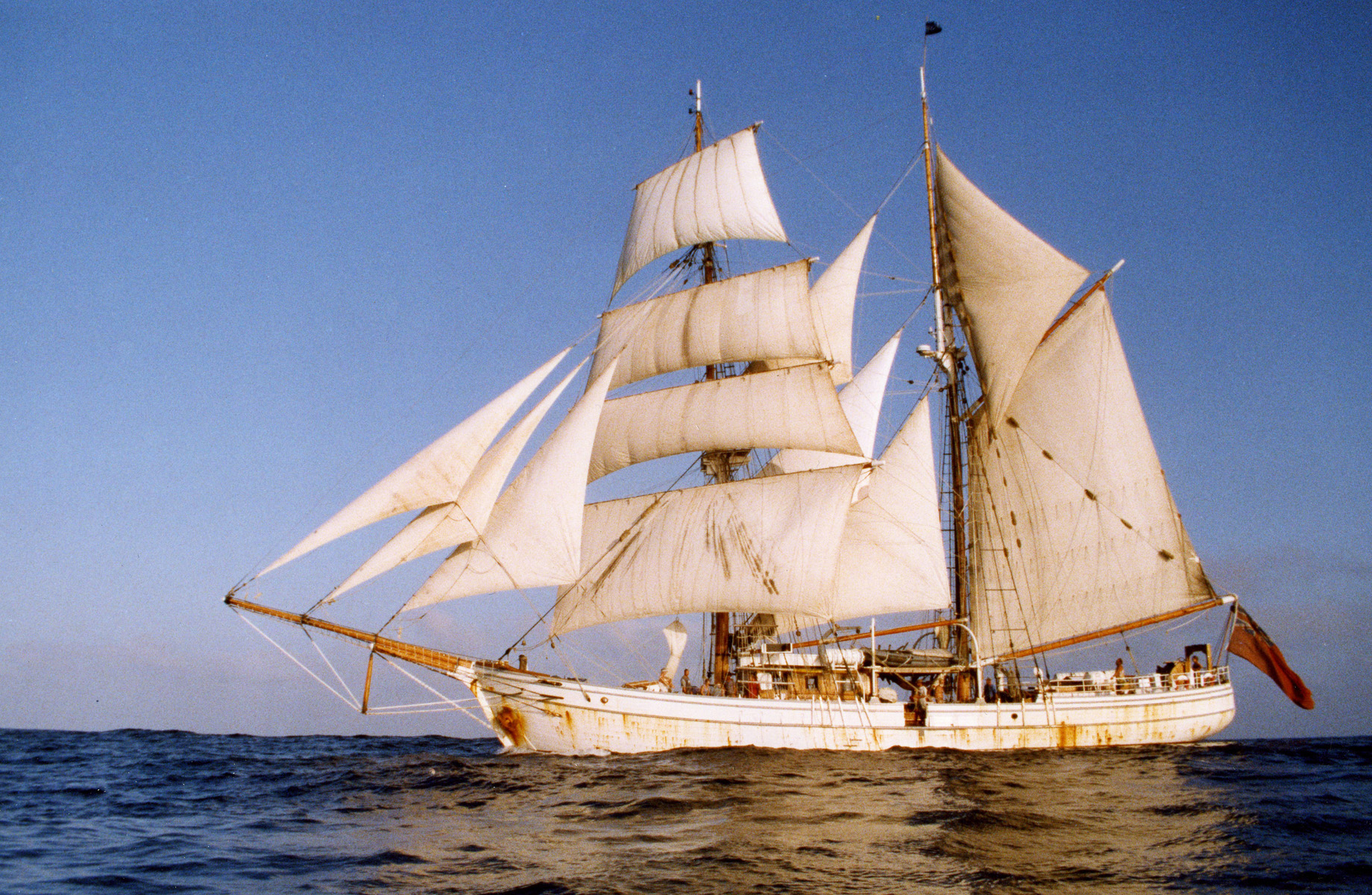

History
- Namesake: Named after the builder and designer Søren Larsen.
- Builder: Søren Larsen & Sons
- In service: 1949
- Identification: MMSI number: 518378000; Callsign: E5U2328
- Status: Active

General characteristics as brigantine
- Length: 42.7 metres (140 ft)
- Beam: 7.8 metres (26 ft)
- Height: 30.5 metres (100 ft) mast height
- Draught: 3.2 metres (10 ft)
- Propulsion: B&W Alpha auxiliary diesel engine, 240 horsepower (180 kW), 7 knots (13 km/h; 8.1 mph)
- Sail plan: Brigantine, 627 square metres (6,750 sq ft) sail area

The tallship Søren Larsen is a brigantine built in 1949 in Nykøbing Mors, Denmark. Her current homeport is Sydney, Australia.

== Design and construction ==
The vessel was constructed by Søren Larsen and Sons at their shipyard in Nykøbing Mors. She is 42.7 metres (140 ft) in length overall, with a beam of 7.8 metres (26 ft), and a draught of 3.2 metres (10 ft). The hull was carvel-built primarily from oak and beech. She was originally galeas-rigged, with an auxiliary engine. The 240 horsepower (180 kW) B&W Alpha diesel could propel the ship at 7 knots (13 km/h; 8.1 mph). The ship's single hold was accessible through three hatches. Søren Larsen was named after her builder, and was one of the last ships produced by the shipyard.

== Operational history ==
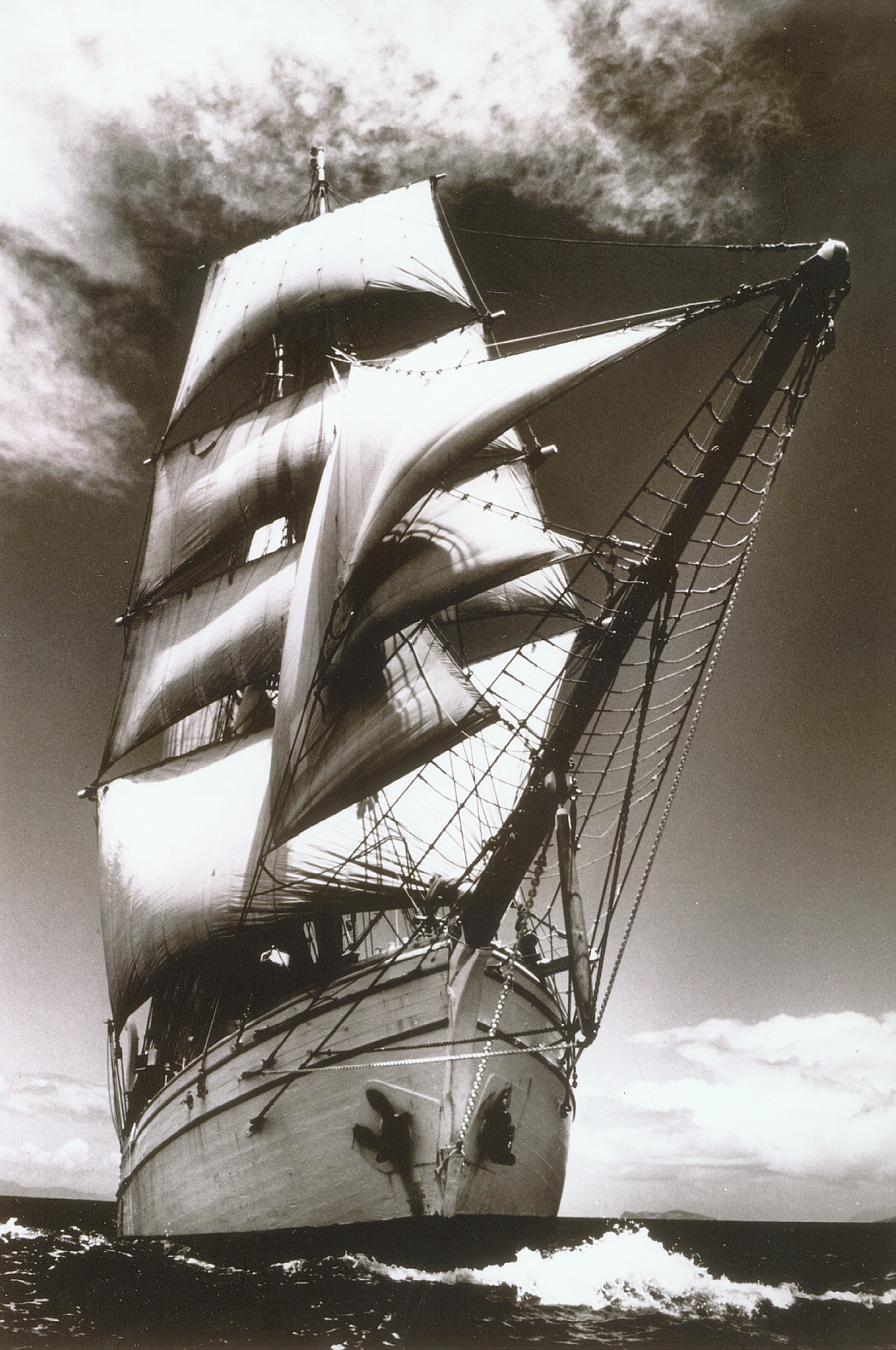
In Botany Bay, Sydney, 1988

The ship was employed on the Baltic trade routes, hauling cargo throughout Scandinavia and northern Europe. On occasion, Søren Larsen ventured as far afield as the United Kingdom and Iceland. In 1972, the ship was gutted by fire. She was laid up until 1978, when the hull was purchased by Square Sail Britain. Søren Larsen was re-decked with iroko, she was re-masted with Douglas fir, and re-rigged as a 19th-century-style brigantine. The new masts gave the ship a mast height of 30.5 metres (100 ft), and she was outfitted with 627 square metres (6,750 sq ft) of sail. The vessel's homeport was changed to Colchester in the United Kingdom.

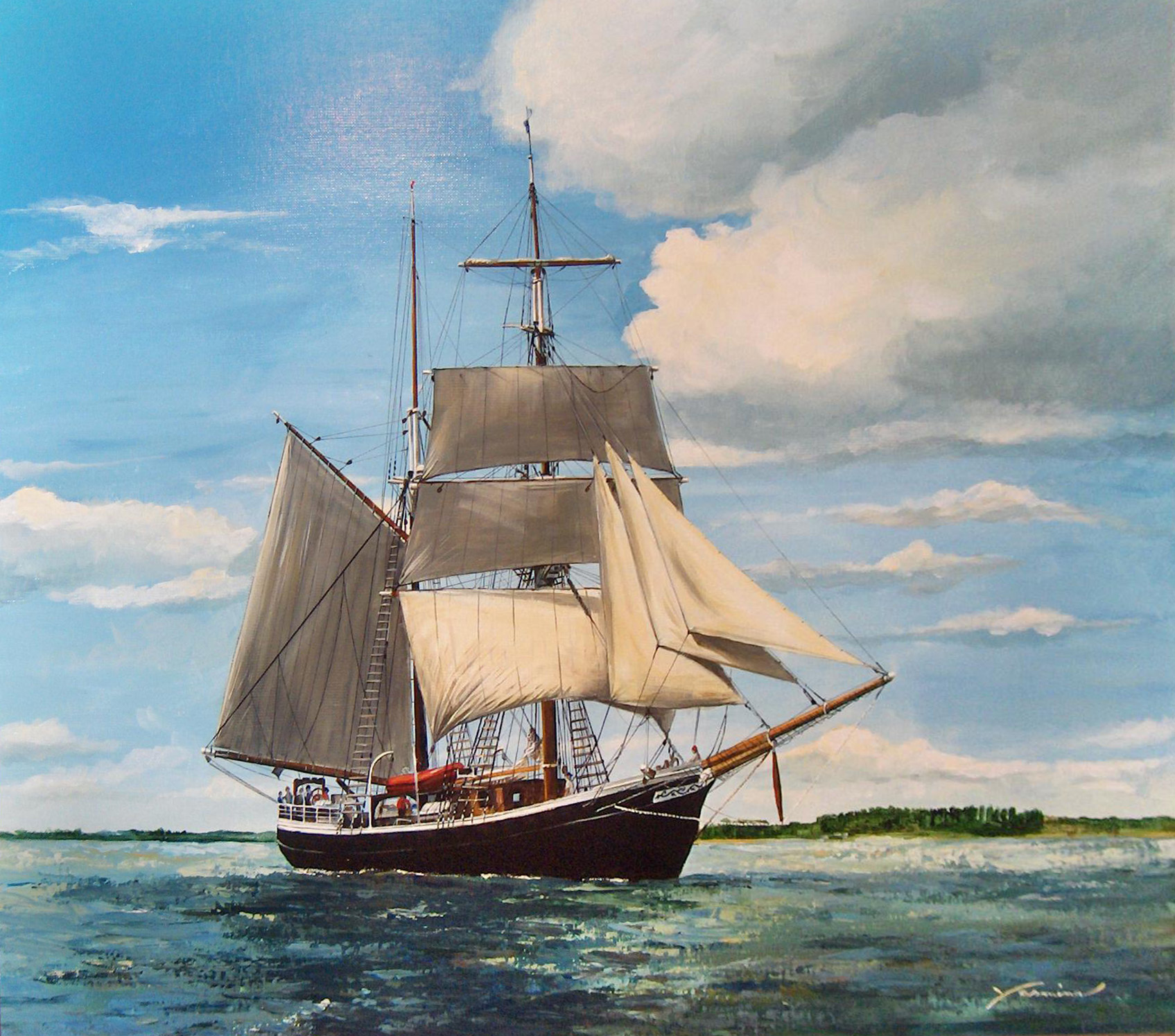
Søren Larsen, painted by the Belgian painter Yasmina

On resuming operations in 1979, Søren Larsen saw extensive use for television and film. She appeared in BBC series The Onedin Line, the film The French Lieutenant's Woman, In Search of the Mary Celeste, and Shackleton. During the 1982 filming of Shackleton, Søren Larsen became the first sailing ship in 70 years to reach the Greenland Arctic Circle. Between 1982 and 1985, the ship was chartered by the Jubilee Sailing Trust: the success of the sailing program, which saw sail training provided to both able-bodied and disabled students, led Jubilee to order the construction of the sail training ship Lord Nelson. Søren Larsen was chartered for the 1987-88 First Fleet Re-enactment Voyage, and served as flagship for the journey: departing from England in May 1987, and sailing via Tenerife, Rio de Janeiro, Cape Town, Mauritius, and Fremantle before arriving in Sydney on Australia Day (26 January) 1988.

In 1991, Søren Larsen sailed around Cape Horn.

In late 2011, she was purchased by Sydney Harbour Tallships. Søren Larsen continues to sail in the South Pacific.

In October 2013, Søren Larsen participated in the International Fleet Review 2013 in Sydney, Australia.
