= Pirates in the arts and popular culture =

Representations of pirates in fiction or literature

Crossed Swords Jolly Roger, a popular fictional pirate flag

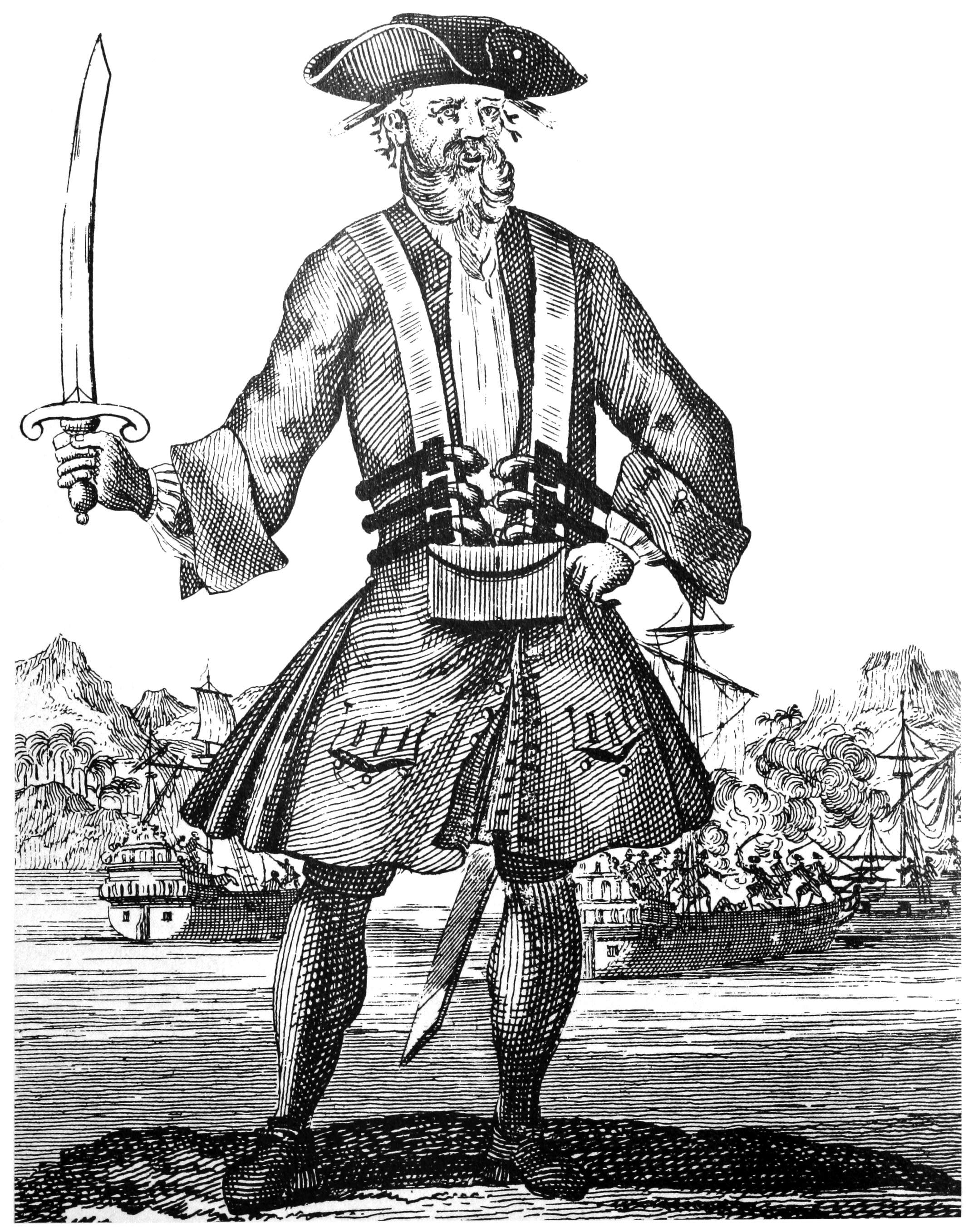
Engraving of the English pirate Blackbeard from the 1724 book A General History of the Pyrates

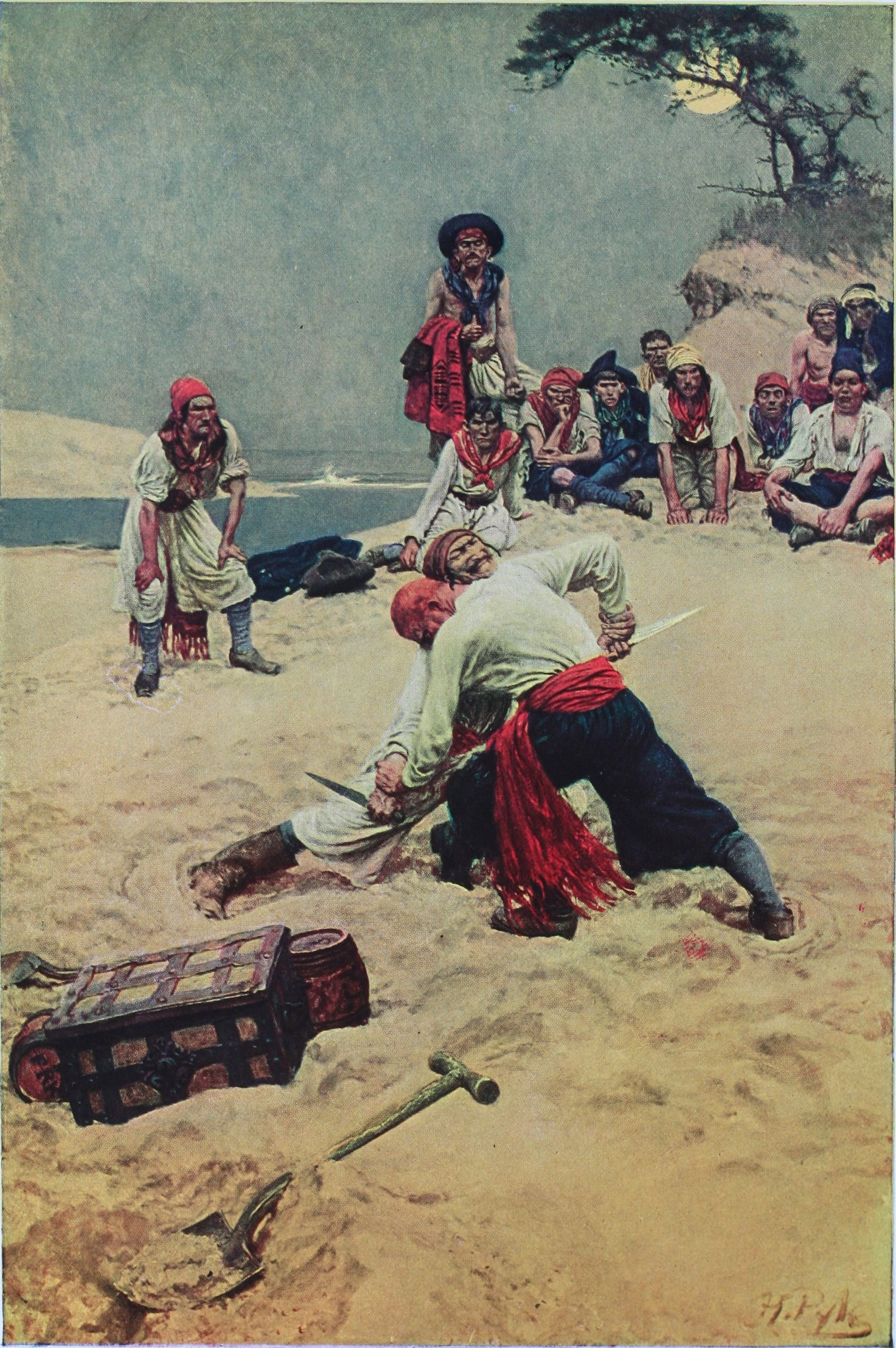
Pirates fight over treasure in a 1911 Howard Pyle illustration.

In English-speaking popular culture, the modern pirate stereotype owes its attributes mostly to the imagined tradition of the 18th-century Caribbean pirate sailing off the Spanish Main and to such celebrated 20th-century depictions as Captain Hook and his crew in the theatrical and film versions of J. M. Barrie's Peter Pan, and Robert Newton's portrayal of Long John Silver in the 1950 film adaptation of the Robert Louis Stevenson novel Treasure Island. In these and countless other books, films, and legends, pirates are portrayed as "swashbucklers" and "plunderers". They are shown on ships, often wearing eyepatches or peg legs, having a parrot perched on their shoulder, speaking in a West Country accent, and saying phrases like "Arr, matey" and "Avast, me hearty". Pirates have retained their image through pirate-themed tourist attractions, film, toys, books and plays.

== Origins ==
The characteristics of pirates in popular culture largely derive from the Golden Age of Piracy in the late 17th and early 18th centuries, with many examples of pirate fiction being set within this era. Vikings, who were also pirates, took on a distinct and separate archetype in popular culture, dating from the Viking revival. The first major literary work to popularise the subject of pirates was A General History of the Robberies and Murders of the most notorious pirates (1724) by Captain Charles Johnson. In giving an almost mythical status to the more colourful characters, such as the notorious English pirates Blackbeard and John Rackham, the book provided the standard account of the lives of many pirates in the Golden Age, and influenced pirate literature of Scottish novelists Robert Louis Stevenson and J. M. Barrie. While Johnson's text recounted the lives of many famous pirates from the era, it is likely that he used considerable licence in his accounts of pirate conversations.

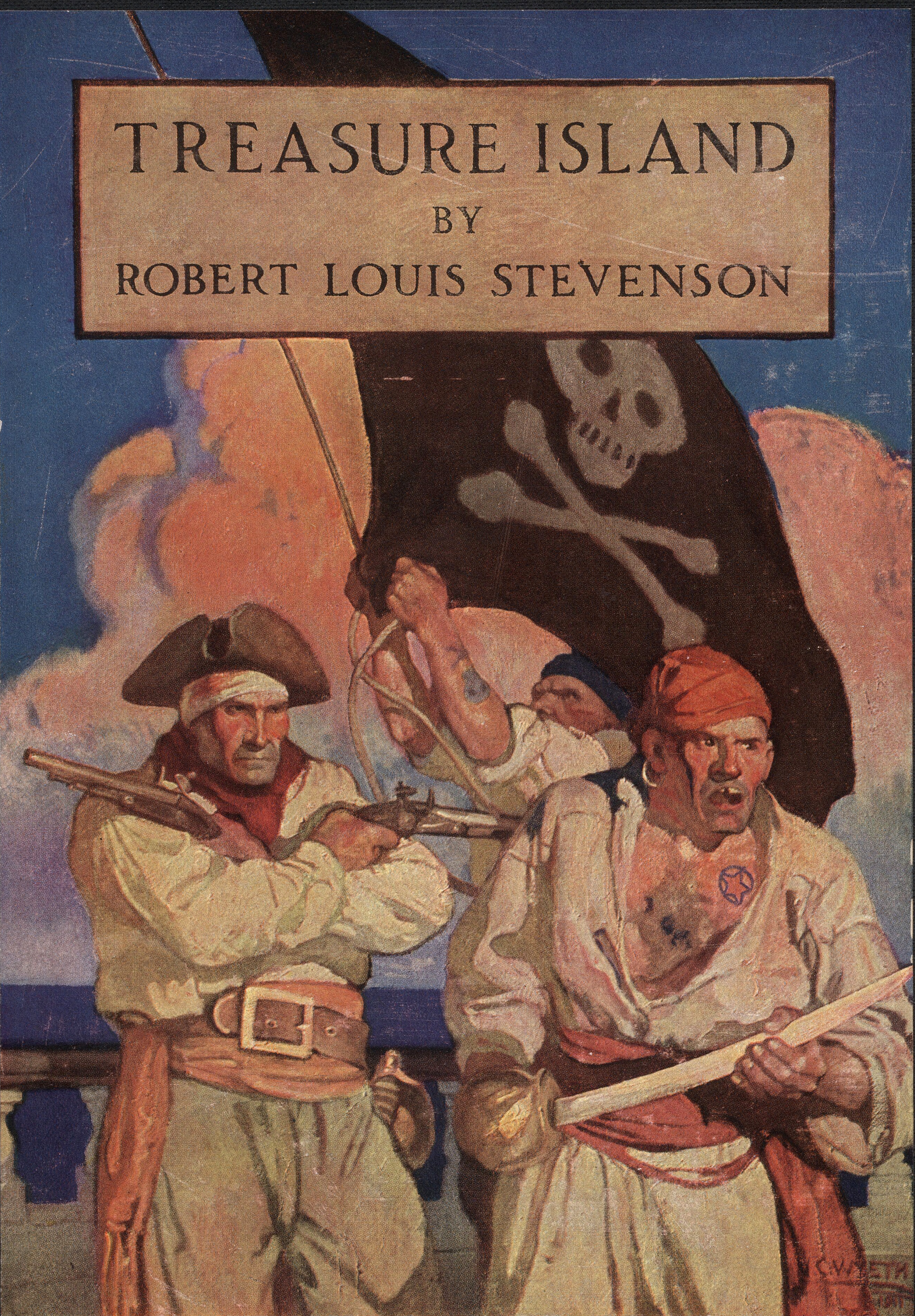
Illustrations of the 1911 edition of Treasure Island, by Pyle's student N. C. Wyeth

Stevenson's Treasure Island (1883) is considered the most influential work of pirate fiction, along with its many film and television adaptations, and introduced or popularised many of the characteristics and cliches now common to the genre. Stevenson identified Johnson's General History of the pirates as one of his major influences, and even borrowed one character's name (Israel Hands) from a list of Blackbeard's crew which appeared in Johnson's book.

In 18th and 19th century Britain, historical-fiction portrayals of pirates on the dramatic stage included false flag props representing the various European navies. A common trope was to represent the archetypical scene where a crew of privateers donned false uniforms along with the false flag as they approached a ship, only raising the skull and bones flag at the last moment before the attack. Other tricks often portrayed on stage included (in a more initially peaceful encounter of ships) the pirate offering to gamble, or claiming the need to inspect documents or retrieve a runaway prisoner, before placing the victim of the scheme in shackles. These portrayals of pirate characters were fictionalised but based on the mythologised historical memory of both the Golden Age of Piracy and the contemporary pirates at that time. Barbary corsairs were a frequent type of pirate portrayed in that genre of stage and literature.

== Appearance and mannerisms of Caribbean pirates ==
In films, books, cartoons, and toys, pirates often have a rough-and-ready appearance that evokes their criminal lifestyle, rogue personalities and adventurous, seafaring pursuits. They are usually greedy, mean-spirited, drunk on rum and focused largely on fighting and robbing enemy pirates and locating hidden treasure. They often wear shabby 17th or 18th century clothing, with a bandana or feathered tricorne. They are almost always armed with a cutlass and a flintlock pistol, or similar weaponry. They sometimes have scars and battle wounds, rotten or missing teeth (suggesting the effects of scurvy), as well as a hook or wooden stump where a hand or a leg has been amputated, and often an eye patch to conceal a lost eye. Some depictions of pirates also include monkeys or parrots as pets, the former mischievously assisting them in thieving and the latter loudly copying whatever the pirate captain says. The ship's captain will force captives and mutinous crewmen to walk the plank over shark-infested waters.

Historical pirates were often sailors or soldiers who had fallen into misfortune or were captured, forced into a life of crime. In various literature, the pirates may be represented as having fallen, perhaps resembling a respectable person in some way. Pirate characters generally quest for buried treasure, plundered riches in treasure chests. Pirates' treasure is usually gold or silver, often in the form of doubloons or pieces of eight.

== Pirate subculture ==
In the 1990s, International Talk Like a Pirate Day was invented as a parody holiday celebrated on September 19. This holiday allows people to "let out their inner pirate" and to dress and speak according to the pirate stereotype above. It has been gaining popularity through the Internet since its founders set up a website teaching "pirate speak."

Many games, movies, and other media are built upon the premise, introduced by Real Ultimate Power, that pirates and buccaneers are sworn enemies of ninjas. The "Pirates versus Ninjas" meme is also expressed in house parties and merchandise at popular-culture clothing and gift stores.

Pirates also play a central role in the parody religion of Pastafarianism. Established in 2005, Pastafarians (members of The Church of the Flying Spaghetti Monster) claim to believe that global warming is a result of the severe decrease in pirates since the 18th century, explaining the coldness associated with winter months that follow Halloween as a direct effect of the number of pirates that make their presence known in celebration.

== Science fiction pirates ==
The pirate archetype has been adapted to science fiction with more or less futuristic dress and speech.

- Air pirates are science fiction and fantasy character archetypes who operate in the air, rather than sailing the sea. As traditional seafaring pirates target sailing ships, air pirates capture and plunder aircraft and other targets for cargo, money, and occasionally they steal entire aircraft.
- Space pirates are science fiction character archetypes who operate in outer space, rather than sailing the sea. As traditional seafaring pirates target sailing ships, space pirates capture and plunder spaceships for cargo, money, and occasionally they steal entire spacecraft.

== Pirates in the arts ==
=== Comics and manga ===
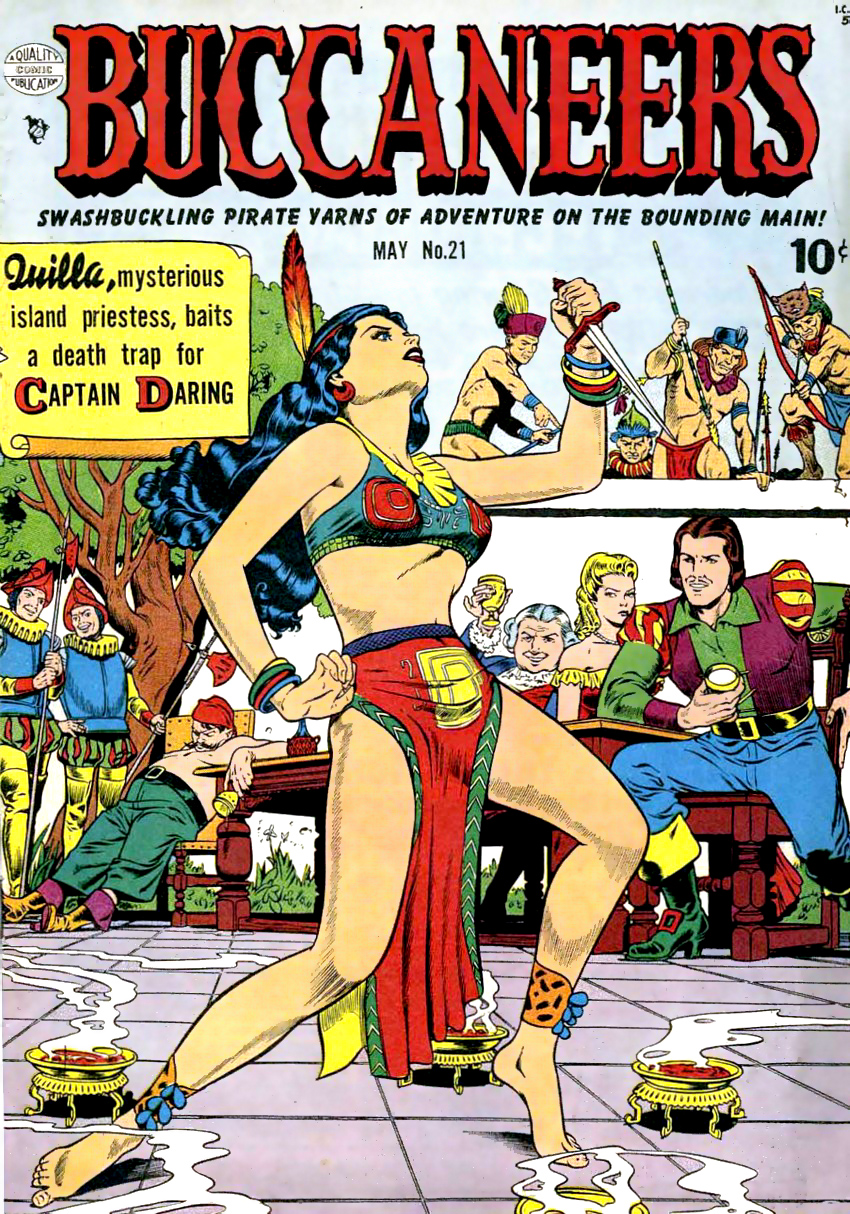
"Swashbuckling Yarns of Piracy": Buccaneers, volume 1, number 21, May 1950. Art by Reed Crandall.

- Terry and the Pirates (1934–1973) by Milton Caniff is an adventure comic strip frequently set among 20th-century pirates of China and Southeast Asia, led by the notorious Dragon Lady.
- Abraham Tuizentfloot, a mad man dressed up as a pirate who frequently wants to attack people. He debuted in Marc Sleen's The Adventures of Nero in 1957.
- Redbeard (1959 onwards), a Belgian comics series by Jean-Michel Charlier and Victor Hubinon starring captain Redbeard.
- A group of hapless pirates in Albert Uderzo's Astérix, in themselves parodies of the characters of Redbeard (see above), often run into Asterix and Obelix and are subsequently beaten up and usually sunk.
- Batman: Leatherwing (1994), an Elseworlds comic by Chuck Dixon featuring Batman as a pirate.
- One Piece (1997 onwards), set in a fictional world where piracy is at its height, the World Government and its Navy attempt to put it to a stop, and a young man named Monkey D. Luffy desires to become the next Pirate King. The most popular manga to date in Japan.
- Black Lagoon (2002 onwards) is a Japanese manga portraying group of modern-day pirates in the southeast Asian sea, largely making money with acts of smuggling, extortion, or acting as mercenaries.
- The Red Seas (2002 onwards), a mix of pirates and strange phenomena by Ian Edginton and Steve Yeowell.
- Homestuck (2009–2016), features a number of pirate themed characters such as Vriska Serket and her ancestor, Marquise Spinneret Mindfang.
- Outlaw Star, the primary antagonists of the series are members of the Pirate's Guild, a large network of space pirate clans throughout the universe.
- Watchmen features a "comic book within a comic book" called Tales of the Black Freighter. Watchmen is set in an alternate history where superheroes are alive and known to be in disgrace, so instead of comics dealing with superheroes, comics dealing with pirates are more popular.

=== Films ===
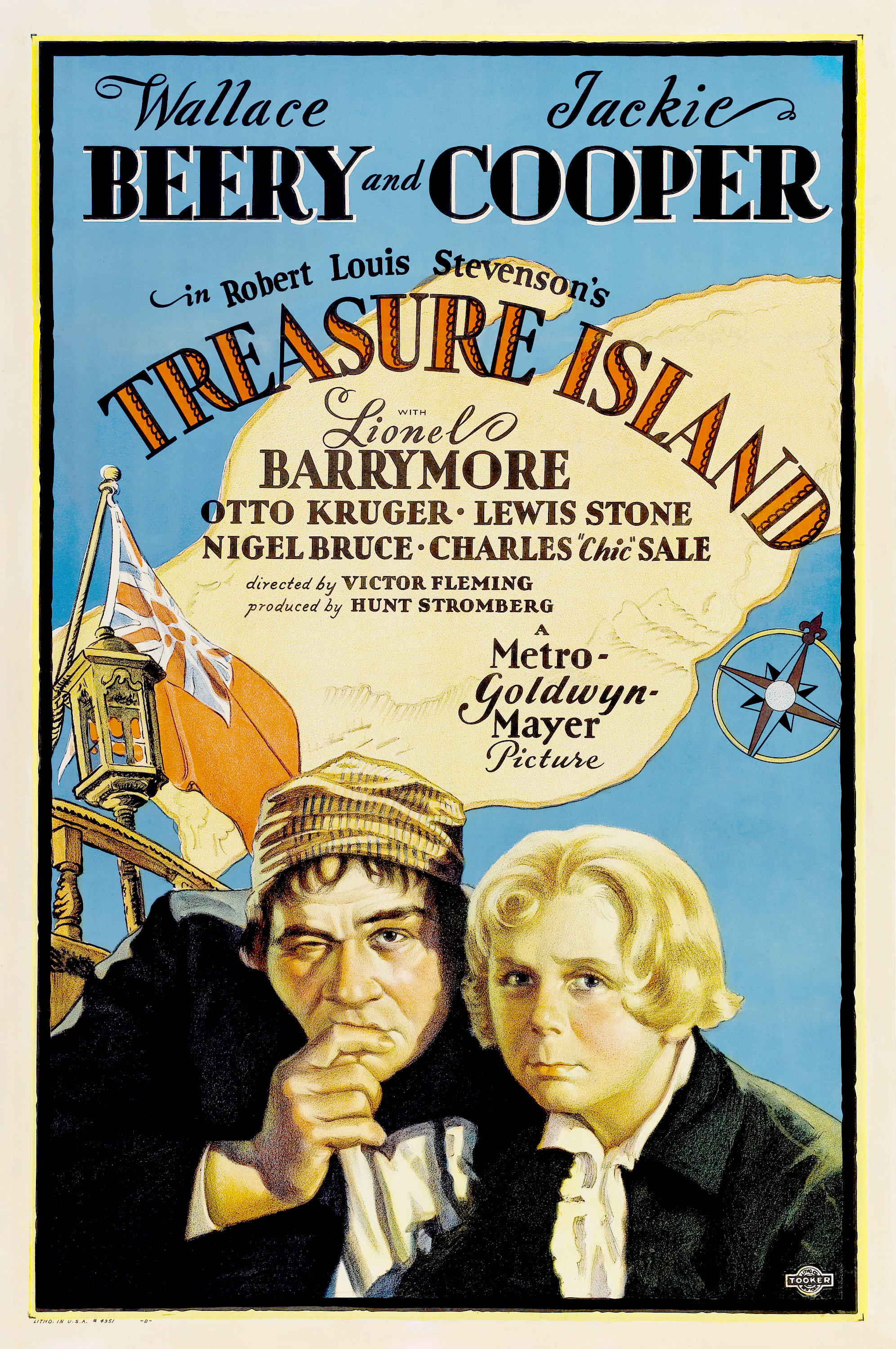
Poster – Treasure Island (1934) 01 colour edit

- The Black Pirate, a 1926 film starring Douglas Fairbanks.
- Treasure Island, a 1934 adaptation of Stevenson's book, starring Wallace Beery.
- Captain Blood, a 1935 film starring Errol Flynn.
- The Buccaneer, a 1938 film starring Fredric March.
- Jamaica Inn, a 1939 film starring Charles Laughton, Maureen O'Hara, and Robert Newton.
- The Sea Hawk, a 1940 film starring Errol Flynn.
- Reap the Wild Wind, a 1942 film starring John Wayne.
- The Black Swan, a 1942 film starring Tyrone Power, Maureen O'Hara, and Anthony Quinn.
- Frenchman's Creek, a 1944 film starring Basil Rathbone and Joan Fontaine.
- The Pirate, a 1948 musical starring Gene Kelly and Judy Garland.
- Treasure Island, a 1950 adaptation of Stevenson's book, starring Robert Newton.
- Against All Flags, a 1952 film starring Errol Flynn and Maureen O'Hara.
- Blackbeard, the Pirate, a 1952 film starring Robert Newton.
- Long John Silver, a 1954 sequel to the novel Treasure Island, with Robert Newton reprising his role.
- The Buccaneer, a 1958 film starring Yul Brynner, Charles Boyer and Charlton Heston.
- The Son of Captain Blood, a 1962 sequel to Captain Blood, starring Sean Flynn.
- Blackbeard's Ghost, a 1968 film starring Peter Ustinov.
- Treasure Island, a 1972 adaptation of Stevenson's book, starring Orson Welles.
- Swashbuckler, a 1976 film starring Robert Shaw, James Earl Jones, Peter Boyle, Genevieve Bujold, Beau Bridges and Anjelica Huston about pirates in Jamaica fighting against the island's corrupt Governor.
- Pirates of the 20th Century, a 1979 Soviet adventure film about modern piracy.
- The Island, a 1980 film based on Peter Benchley's novel.
- The Pirate Movie, a 1982 Australian film loosely based on The Pirates of Penzance, stars Christopher Atkins and Kristy McNichol.
- Nate and Hayes, a 1983 film based on the adventures of the notorious Bully Hayes, a pirate in the South Pacific in the late 19th century. Also known as Savage Islands.
- Yellowbeard, a 1983 film starring Graham Chapman as Yellowbeard the pirate.
- The Goonies, a 1985 film starring Sean Astin, Josh Brolin and Corey Feldman.
- Pirates, a 1986 Roman Polanski comic/adventure film starring Walter Matthau.
- The Princess Bride, a 1987 film adaptation of the William Goldman novel that has "The Dread Pirate Roberts" as one of its central characters.
- Hook, a 1991 film starring Robin Williams.
- Cutthroat Island, a 1995 Renny Harlin film that was a notable flop, starring Geena Davis
- Muppet Treasure Island, a 1996 film starring The Muppets and Tim Curry.
- Six Days Seven Nights, a 1998 film, features piracy in the South China Sea.
- Scooby-Doo on Zombie Island, a 1998 film, Scooby and the gang investigate a bayou island haunted by the spirits of Morgan Moonscar and his crew.
- Treasure Planet, a 2002 film, Disney-animated science fiction adaptation of Stevenson's book.
- Pirates of the Caribbean, a series of films based on Walt Disney's Pirates of the Caribbean attraction.
  - Pirates of the Caribbean: The Curse of the Black Pearl (2003), the first film starring Johnny Depp, Geoffrey Rush, Orlando Bloom, Keira Knightley, and Kevin McNally.
  - Pirates of the Caribbean: Dead Man's Chest (2006), the second film starring Depp, Bloom, Knightley, McNally and Bill Nighy.
  - Pirates of the Caribbean: At World's End (2007), the third film starring Depp, Rush, Bloom, Knightley, McNally and Nighy.
  - Pirates of the Caribbean: On Stranger Tides (2011), the fourth film starring Depp, Rush, McNally Penélope Cruz and Ian McShane.
  - Pirates of the Caribbean: Dead Men Tell No Tales (2017), the fifth film starring Depp, Rush, McNally and Javier Bardem.
- Pirates of Treasure Island, a 2006 film adaptation of the novel Treasure Island produced by The Asylum, starring Lance Henriksen.
- The Pirates! In an Adventure with Scientists!, a 2012 Aardman Animations film loosely adapted from a comedy book by Gideon Defoe.

=== Literature ===
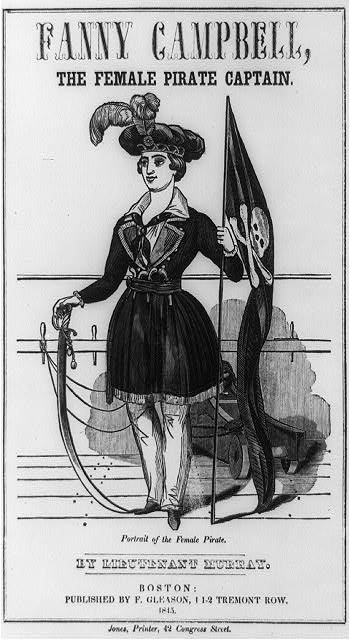
Fanny Campbell, protagonist of the 1844 novel "Fanny Campbell, the Female Pirate Captain" by Maturin Murray Ballou

- Robinson Crusoe (1719) and The Life, Adventures and Piracies of the Famous Captain Singleton (1720) by Daniel Defoe were among the first novels to depict piracy, among other maritime adventures.
- A General History of the Robberies and Murders of the most notorious Pyrates (1724) by Captain Charles Johnson (possibly a pseudonym for Defoe) introduced many features which later became common in pirate literature, such as pirates with missing legs or eyes, the myth of pirates burying treasure, and the name of the pirates flag Jolly Roger.
- The Corsair (1814), a poem by Byron concerns a pirate captain. It directly inspired Berlioz' overture Le Corsaire (1844).
- Moby-Dick (1851) by Herman Melville.
- The Pirate (1821), a novel by Sir Walter Scott.
- "The Gold-Bug" (1843), a short story by Edgar Allan Poe featured a search for buried treasure hidden by Captain William Kidd and found by following an elaborate code on a scrap of parchment.
- Fanny Campbell, the Female Pirate Captain (1844), a novel about a woman who goes to sea dressed as a man to rescue her fiancé and becomes a pirate captain
- Treasure Island (1883), a novel by Robert Louis Stevenson.
- The Black Corsair (1898), first in a series of pirate novels by Emilio Salgari.
- Sandokan (1883–1913), a series of pirate novels by Emilio Salgari. Set in Malaysia in the late 1800s.
- Captain Blood (1922), a novel by Rafael Sabatini (followed by two sequels: Captain Blood Returns [aka The Chronicles of Captain Blood] and The Fortunes of Captain Blood, each being a collection of Captain Blood adventures).
- The Dealings of Captain Sharkey (1925), a novel by Sir Arthur Conan Doyle, famous for his stories of Sherlock Holmes.
- Queen of the Black Coast (1934), novelette by Robert E. Howard features Bêlit a pirate queen who has a romantic relationship with Conan. She is Conan's first serious lover.
- Atlas Shrugged (1957) by Ayn Rand contains a fictional pirate Ragnar Danneskjöld whose activities are motivated by a capitalist ideology.
- The Princess Bride (1973), a novel by William Goldman has "The Dread Pirate Roberts" as one of its central characters.
- The Island (1979) by Peter Benchley and the 1980 movie adaptation for which he wrote the screenplay, feature a latter-day band of pirates who prey on civilian shipping in the Caribbean.
- On Stranger Tides (1987), a historical fantasy novel by Tim Powers. It was loosely adapted into the fourth Pirates of the Caribbean film.
- Bloody Jack (2002), a historical novel by L.A. Meyer.
- The Pirates! in an Adventure with Scientists (2004) by Gideon Defoe, a surreal adventure with stereotypical pirates and Charles Darwin. Defoe has written subsequent books involving the same pirate crew and their anachronistic, absurd adventures.
- The Piratica Series (2004, 2006, and 2007), a series of pirate novels by Tanith Lee.
- Sea Witch (2006), a novel for adults by Helen Hollick published by DA Diamonds.
- The Adventures of Hector Lynch (2007–2009), a pirate series by Tim Severin
- The Government Manual for New Pirates (2007), a spoof of survival guides by Matthew David Brozik and Jacob Sager Weinstein.
- Isle of Swords (2007), a novel by Wayne Thomas Batson.
- Pirate Latitudes (2009), a novel by Michael Crichton.
- The Pyrates Way Magazine (2006–Present), a quarterly online magazine by Kimball Publications, LLC.
- Maddox (writer) often portrays himself as a pirate on his website The Best Page in the Universe.
- Ana e os piratas do novo mundo (2012), a novel by Lucas Peixoto Dantas

=== Music ===
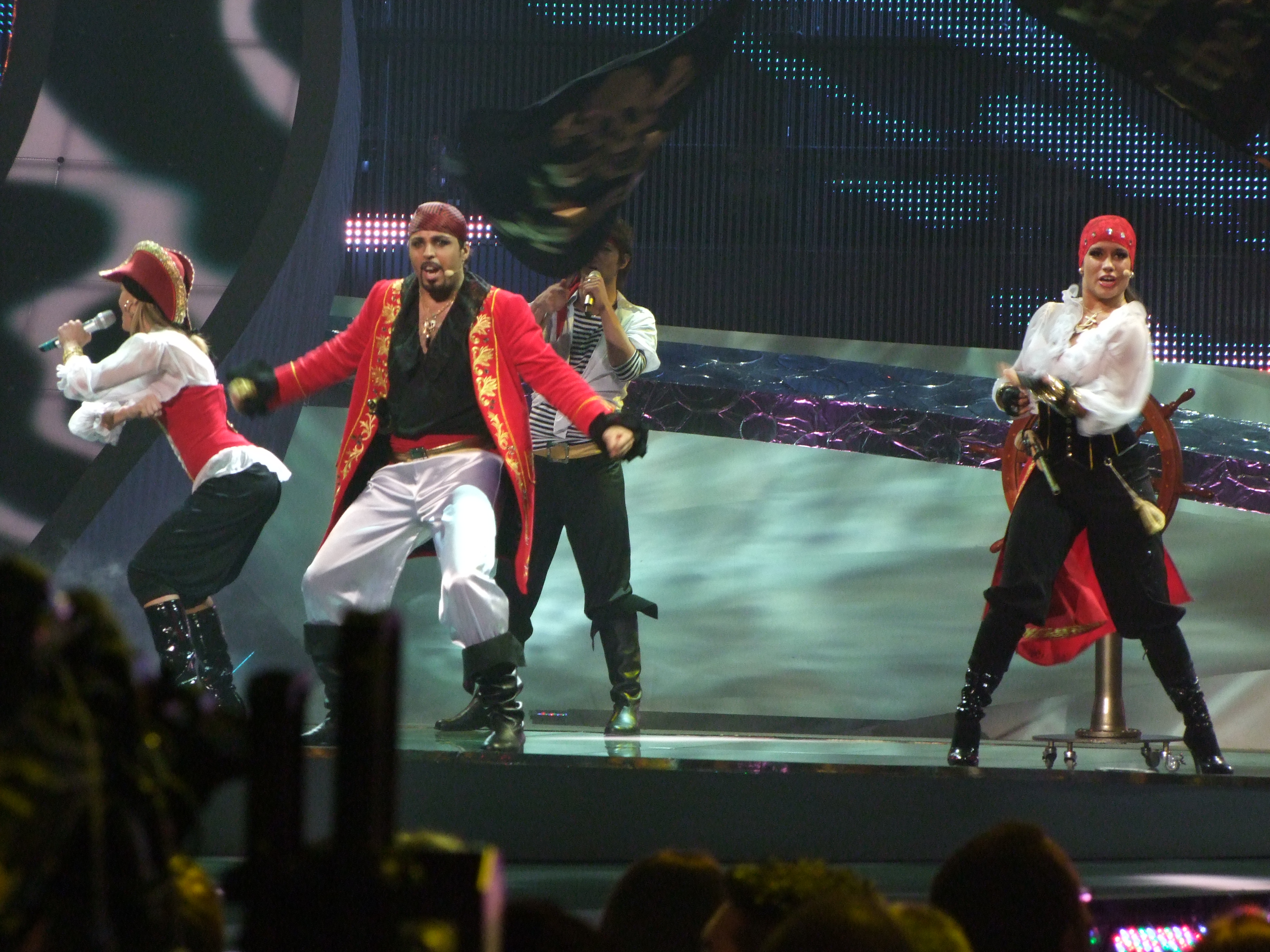
The Latvian singing group Pirates of the Sea perform "Wolves of the Sea" at Eurovision 2008

- Musicians have long been drawn towards pirate culture, due to its disestablishmentarianism and motley dress. An early 1960s British pop group called itself Johnny Kidd and the Pirates, and wore eye patches while they performed. Keith Moon, drummer of The Who, was a fan of Robert Newton. Bands like Flogging Molly, The Briggs, Dropkick Murphys, The Coral, The Mighty Mighty Bosstones, Tokyo Ska Paradise Orchestra, Bullets And Octane, Mad Caddies, The Vandals, Armored Saint, Jimmy Buffett, and Stephen Malkmus have pirate-themed songs as well.
- Lagerstein is an Australian pirate themed band based in Queensland Australia
- Alestorm is a pirate-themed power/folk metal band based in Perth, Scotland. Their fans are also encouraged to dress up like pirates and bring props to concerts.
- Ye Banished Privateers, an Umea-based band, perform shanty- and folk- inspired pirate music, also incorporating theatrical elements into their concerts.
- Swashbuckle is an American thrash metal band who dress up and sing about pirates.
- Emerson, Lake & Palmer recorded the song "Pirates", a 13 minute long performance piece from their 1977 tour. It features the Orchestra de L'Opera de Paris. The piece can be found on the album Works Volume 1.
- Running Wild, a German metal band, adopted a "pirate metal" image in 1987, with their third album.
- The Sex Pistols adapted the saucy song "Good Ship Venus" as their hit "Friggin' in the Rigging". Fellow Malcolm McLaren protégée, Adam Ant, took the pirate image further. One of the tracks on the album Kings of the Wild Frontier was called "Jolly Roger".
- Gorillaz recorded a song called "Pirate Jet" which appears as the 16th track on their third studio album Plastic Beach.
- In 1986, the Beastie Boys paid homage to the pirate lifestyle on their Licensed to Ill album with the song "Rhymin' and Stealin'". The song is filled with piratical and nautical phrasing liberally mixed with 1980s hip-hop references.
- Mutiny is an Australian pirate themed folk-punk band with releases on Fistolo Records.
- Goth musician/comedian Voltaire illustrates the sometimes humorous rivalry between vampiric and pirate camps of goths in the song "Vampire Club" from the album Boo Hoo (2002).
- American comedy band The Aquabats recorded a song entitled "Captain Hampton and the Midget Pirates" on their 1997 album The Fury of The Aquabats!, which told the story of Jim, a young boy who joins a pirate-hunting crew headed by Captain Hampton. Pirates are also mentioned in the band's 2000 song "The Wild Sea" on Myths, Legends and Other Amazing Adventures, Vol. 2.
- The Pirate, a musical starring Judy Garland and Gene Kelly, has several songs about piracy in general, and the dread pirate "Mack the Black" Macoco in particular.
- The Dreadnoughts are a Vancouver, Canada pirate-based band, including use of an accordion and a fiddle.
- Relient K released a single covering the song "The Pirates Who Don't Do Anything" for the children's show VeggieTales. It was originally recorded by the cast of VeggieTales, and Relient K's version of the song was later included in the 2003 compilation album Veggie Rocks!
- In Eurovision Song Contest 2008, the Latvian band Pirates of the Sea entered with the song "Wolves of the Sea".
- Nox Arcana recorded a pirate-themed album Phantoms of the High Seas in 2008, that contains a series of hidden puzzles and clues leading to a treasure map.
- Cosmo Jarvis released the song "Gay Pirates" on 23 January 2011.
- The Original Rabbit Foot Spasm Band released the song "Pirates!" in their album Year of the Rabbit on 3 February 2011.
- "Barret's Privateers" is a song written by Stan Rogers popular in Nova Scotia, Canada detailing the fictional story of Elcid Barret and his privateers and their voyage on the Antelope to raid American shipping vessels.

=== Stage ===
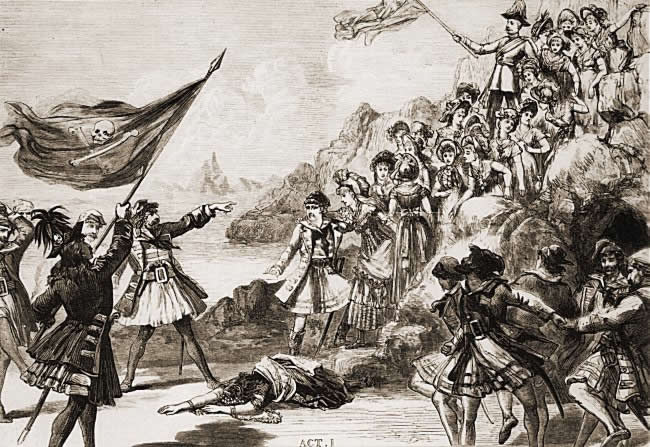
The Pirates of Penzance, 1880

In 1879, the comic opera The Pirates of Penzance was an instant hit in New York, and the original London production in 1880 ran for 363 performances. The piece, depicting an incompetent band of "tenderhearted" British pirates, is still performed widely today, and corresponds to historical knowledge about the emergence of piracy in the Caribbean.

While they do not appear onstage, in William Shakespeare's play Hamlet, Hamlet's ship to England is overtaken by pirates, allowing him to escape. Another example of pirates unwittingly saving someone's life appears in Shakespeare's Pericles, Prince of Tyre.

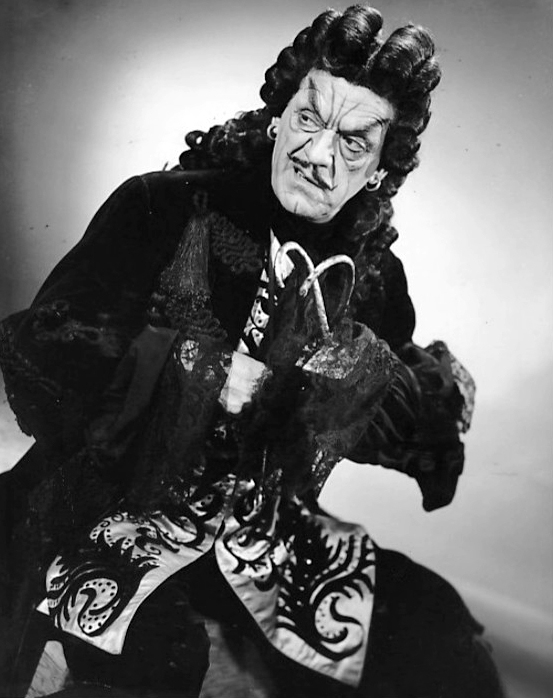
Boris Karloff as Captain Hook in a 1951 Broadway production of Peter Pan

In 1904, J.M. Barrie's play Peter Pan, or The Boy Who Wouldn't Grow Up was first performed. In the book, Peter's enemy in Neverland is the pirate crew led by Captain Hook. Details on Barrie's conception of Captain Hook are lacking, but he was seemingly inspired by at least one historical privateer, and possibly by Robert Louis Stevenson's Long John Silver. In film adaptations released in 1924, 1953, and 2003, Hook's dress, as well as the attire of his crew, corresponds to stereotypical notions of pirate appearance.

- Il pirata (The Pirate) is an opera by Vincenzo Bellini, 1827
- The Pirates of Penzance, a comic operetta by Gilbert and Sullivan contains a Pirate King and a crew of orphan pirates.
- Captain Sabertooth is a play first performed in the zoo\amusement park at Norway by Terje Formoe.
- The Buccaneers of America by John Esquemeling is the supposedly real stories of some Caribbean pirates.
- The Lady Pirates of Captain Bree also called Captain Bree and her Lady Pirates by Martin A. Follose and Bill Francoeur, a musical spoof
- Störtebeker Festival on Rügen island in Germany, established in 1959/1993, is one of the best-established open-air theatres in Europe, following the stories and legends of Klaus Störtebeker and his Victual Brothers and Likedeelers of the 14th century.

=== Television ===
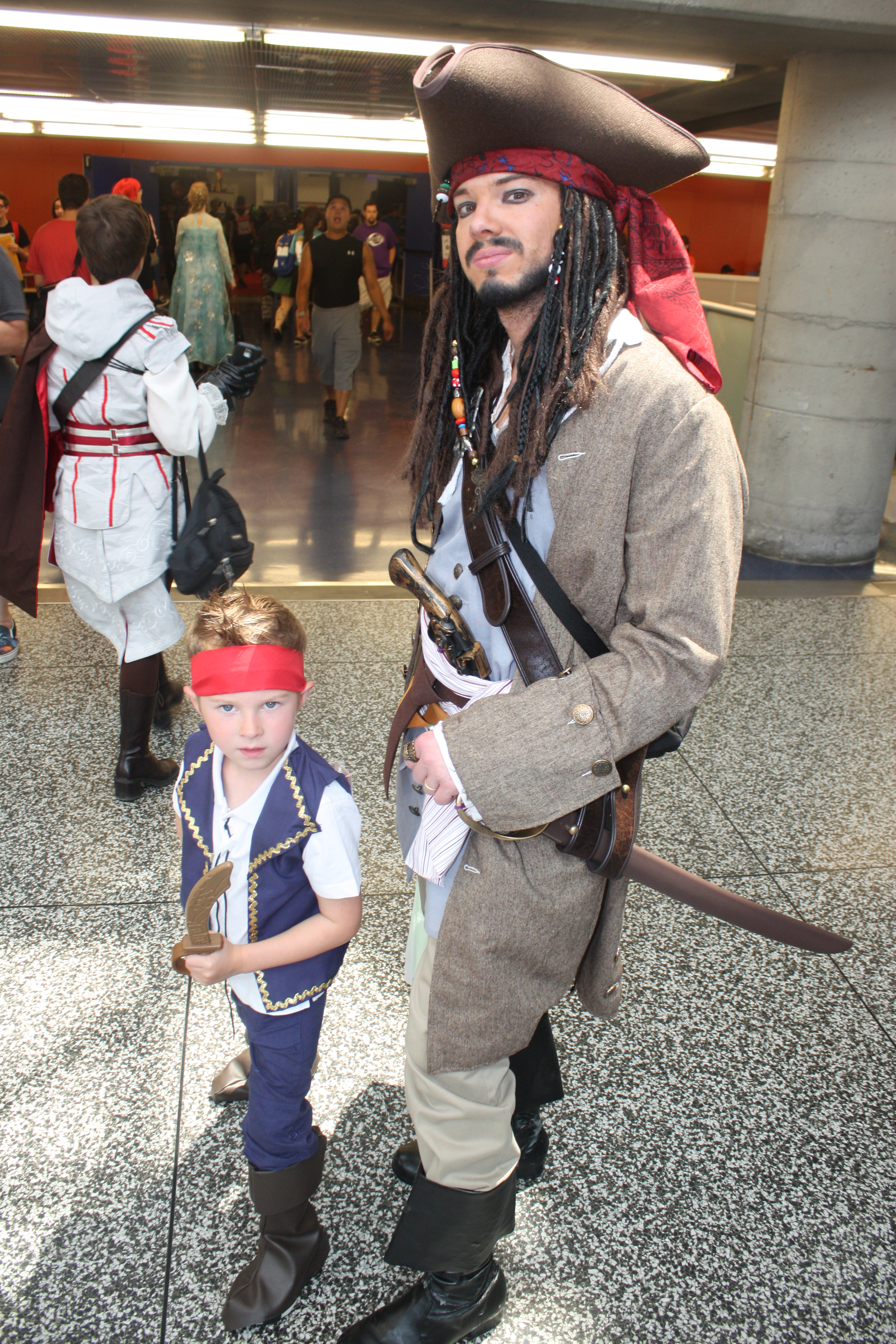
A child dressed as the Disney television character Jake of the Neverland Pirates poses with movie pirate Captain Jack Sparrow at Montreal Comicon 2015.

A pirate mascot on a tourist ship in Croatia

- The Buccaneers 1956 - A juvenile adventure series produced for Britain's ITV. It featured Robert Shaw as Captain Dan Tempest, a reformed pirate in service to the British administration in the Bahamas during the early 18th century.
- Captain Pugwash, a series of British children's animated television programmes, comic strips and books, was first shown on the BBC in 1957.
- The Doctor and his friends encountered space pirates in numerous episodes of BBC's Doctor Who (such as The Space Pirates), though they also met historical pirates in The Smugglers (1966) and The Curse of the Black Spot (2011). Both stories involved the bounty of Captain Henry Avery (Hugh Bonneville), who the Doctor eventually befriended.
- In a 1969 episode of Hanna-Barbera's Scooby-Doo, Where Are You!, Mystery Inc. faced the ghost of Redbeard (voiced by John Stephenson).
- The singing and dancing pirates Nasty Max, Mighty Matt, Massmedia and Sleazeappeal from the animated series Spartakus and the Sun Beneath the Sea.
- Disney's TaleSpin (1990) featured the air pirate Don Karnage who always tried to steal goods and sometimes treasures from Baloo.
- The Pirates of Dark Water is a Hanna-Barbera animated series of the 1990s.
- Mad Jack the Pirate, produced by Bill Kopp, showed on Fox Kids in the 1990s.
- The Wiggles introduced the friendly pirate Captain Feathersword (played by Paul Paddick) in the 1993 video Wiggle Time!
- Pirates was a 1994 children's sitcom about a family of pirates living in a council house.
- The animated series SpongeBob SquarePants' theme song is sung by Painty the Pirate, voiced by Pat Pinney. Certain episodes are introduced by Patchy the Pirate, portrayed by Tom Kenny, the voice of SpongeBob SquarePants. Also, some episodes feature recurring character The Flying Dutchman, who is a pirate ghost.
- One Piece (1999 onwards), the animated adaptation of the Japanese comic of the same name (see above).
- Pirate Islands, a 2003 Australian children's television show, and sequel Pirate Islands: The Lost Treasure of Fiji.
- Black Lagoon is a 2006 anime about pirates in the South China Sea. It is a somewhat realistic look at the underlying themes of modern-day piracy.
- The seventh season of Survivor, Pearl Islands, and Pirate Master had a piracy theme.
- In the show Deadliest Warrior, there was an episode titled "Pirate vs. Knight".
- The Disney Junior animated series Jake and the Never Land Pirates debuted in 2011.
- Kaizoku Sentai Gokaiger (2011), the 35th anniversary season of the Super Sentai series, has a pirate theme; its American counterpart Power Rangers Super Megaforce which is part of the 20th anniversary season of Power Rangers, uses costumes, props, and footage from Gokaiger.
- Marika Kato is the protagonist and space pirate captain of the Bentenmaru in the anime Bodacious Space Pirates (2012).
- Black Sails is a television drama series created by Jonathan E. Steinberg and Robert Levine for Starz Inc., which premiered in January 2014.
- Crossbones is an American television series on the NBC network which premiered May 30, 2014.
- The Flemish children's TV series Piet Piraat by Studio 100 stars a pirate captain and his crew.
- The Nickelodeon animated TV series The Loud House features a character named CJ, who likes to play pirates. "Arrr in the Family", an episode of the spinoff The Casagrandes, centers around the pirate theme.
- The HBO Max TV series Our Flag Means Death is a romantic comedy created by David Jenkins in 2022.

=== Video games ===
- Alone in the Dark is a survival horror game in which the antagonist, Ezechiel Pregzt, is a pirate turned eldritch cultist. Its sequel, Alone in the Dark 2, featured several pirates led by One Eyed Jack as antagonists.
- Assassin's Creed IV: Black Flag is centered around the Golden Age of Piracy.
- Brawlhalla features Thatch as a playable character
- Captain Syrup is the main antagonist of Wario Land and Wario Land II. She shows up again in Wario Land: Shake It!.
- Claw is a platform game by Monolith Productions that is a cartoon parody of pirate films.
- Donkey Kong Country 2: Diddy's Kong Quest features pirate-themed enemies and locations, including the recurring villain King K. Rool, now named Kaptain K. Rool and dressed as a pirate captain.
- Doodle Pirate is an Android game developed by Impudia Games, featuring a comedic side of treasure hunting.
- Final Fantasy XII has several characters, including Balthier, who are sky pirates. As well, Faris in Final Fantasy V and Leila in Final Fantasy II are pirates.
- Pirates feature as a character class in several Fire Emblem games.
- The Five Nights at Freddy's franchise features an animatronic named Foxy The Pirate.
- Heroes of the Storm features pirate-themed battleground Blackheart's Bay, and Blackheart, the ghost pirate lord, as an announcer.
- The action role-playing game Kingdom Hearts II features Port Royal, a world that adapts the plot of Pirates of the Caribbean: The Curse of the Black Pearl. It features heroes Sora, Donald, and Goofy teaming up with movie protagonist Jack Sparrow to fight against the movie's villain, Barbossa, as well as a later scenario where they revisit Jack. Kingdom Hearts III features the Caribbean, a world in which they team up with Jack once again to battle Davy Jones in an adaptation of Pirates of the Caribbean: At World's End.
- The Legend of Zelda: The Wind Waker features pirates such as Tetra, who is later revealed to be Princess Zelda, and her crew.
- Lego Racers first boss is Captain Redbeard. After he is beaten, the player can build cars using "pirated-themed" lego pieces.
- Loot, a card game made by Gamewright.
- The Dark Pictures Anthology: Man of Medan features three modern day pirates as the main antagonists.
- Maple Story has a Pirate job class.
- Medal of Honor: Warfighter, a first-person shooter made by Danger Close Games
- Megaman Battle Network 6 has a WWW member named Captain Blackbeard, an operator of Diveman.EXE who dressed as a sailor.
- Metroid is a videogame in which the main antagonists are space pirates.
- The pirate-themed Monkey Island series of video games is inspired by Tim Powers' book On Stranger Tides and Disneyland's Pirates of the Caribbean ride. It is set in the 18th century Caribbean and stars the hero pirate Guybrush Threepwood and the evil pirate LeChuck.
- Pirates of the Burning Sea is a swashbuckling MMORPG set in the early 18th century Caribbean.
- Paper Mario: The Thousand-Year Door features a ghost pirate named Cortez that guarded the fifth Crystal Star, but befriended Mario after he helped him on his fight against Lord Crump.
- Pirates of the Caribbean Online was a massively multiplayer online role-playing game based on Disney's Pirates of the Caribbean films.
- Pirates: The Legend of Black Kat by Westwood studios is a mix of third-person adventure and sea battles.
- Pirates, Vikings and Knights II is a multiplayer video game in which players can play as a team of stereotypical pirates.
- Plundered Hearts is a text adventure set in the 17th century in which the player character is a young woman who gets kidnapped by pirates.
- Ratchet & Clank Future: Tools of Destruction and Ratchet & Clank Future: Quest for Booty contain pirates as enemies throughout the levels.
- Rogue Galaxy is a role-playing video game in which the main character joins a crew of space pirates to help defeat an oppressive empire.
- Ruby Heart is a female pirate created by Capcom for the game Marvel vs Capcom 2. She also makes cameos in the game's sequel and Street Fighter V.
- Sea of Thieves is an open world video game with a pirate-themed setting.
- Sid Meier's Pirates! is a video game featuring pirates.
- Skies of Arcadia is a video game for the Dreamcast (later remade as Skies of Arcadia Legends for the GameCube) about a group of air pirates that struggle against an oppressive power threatening to take over and destroy the world.
- Sly 3: Honor Among Thieves features a level in which the Cooper Gang steals a pirate ship, and upgrades it to defeat rival pirate crews
- Sonic Rush Adventure takes place in a pirate-themed world, including a robot pirate named Captain Whisker.
- In the Soul series, Cervantes, a long-standing character in the franchise, is a pirate. In Soul Calibur III, there is a 'Pirate' class option for custom characters.
- Star Wars Empire At War contains a non-playable faction called the Black Sun Pirates, a gang of mercenaries.
- In Suikoden IV there are a great deal of pirates to encounter and recruit.
- In Tales of Berseria the protagonist, Velvet Crowe, reluctantly teams up with a group of pirates. The first mate, Eizen, becomes part of the main cast, while the rest of the crew makes frequent appearances throughout the game. The player has the choice of sending the crew on expeditions to retrieve items and explore uncharted waters.
- Tropico 2: Pirate Cove is a 2003 city-building game in which the player runs a pirate island as the Pirate King.
- Uncharted Waters is a series of role-playing video games by Koei set in the Age of Exploration where the player takes the role of a naval fleet captain. All the games feature pirates as regular threats, and it is possible to play as pirate characters in some iterations.
- The independent action-adventure game Wandersong features a chapter called "Voyage of the Lady Arabica," where the bard protagonist and his witch friend Miriam set out on a voyage with what appears to be a pirate crew. Despite their appearance, however, they do not engage in usual pirate activities, instead growing and selling coffee beans.
- World of Warcraft features pirates as NPCs and quest givers. In addition, Pirate's Day is celebrated in-game on September 19 each year in honour of International Talk Like a Pirate Day.
- Yohoho! Puzzle Pirates is a massively multiplayer online game in which the player takes the role of a pirate, having adventures on the high seas and pillaging money from roaming enemy ships.
- Zack & Wiki: Quest for Barbaros' Treasure is an adventure video puzzle game for the Wii.
- The first hub in Pac-Man World contains four pirate-themed levels: Buccaneer Beach, Corsair's Cove, Crazy Cannonade, and HMS Windbag.
- Uncharted 4: A Thief's End is an adventure game centered around trying to find Henry Every's treasure

=== Advertising ===
- Captain Crook was a character in McDonald's restaurants' McDonaldland advertising, 1971–1985. He appeared as a "mascot"-type costumed character, performed by Robert Towers and voiced by Larry Storch.
- Jean LaFoote was an animated pirate character appearing in advertising for Cap'n Crunch cereal in the mid-1970s. He was created by Jay Ward Productions and voiced by Jay Ward regular Bill Scott.
- Captain Morgan – the namesake of the British brand of rum is Sir Henry Morgan (c. 1635 – 1688), known as both a privateer and a pirate.

== Pirates in sports ==
Because pirate ships connote fearsomeness, loyalty and teamwork, many professional and amateur sports teams use the nickname Pirates, as well as other nicknames or logos associated with cultural depictions of pirates, such as an eyepatch.

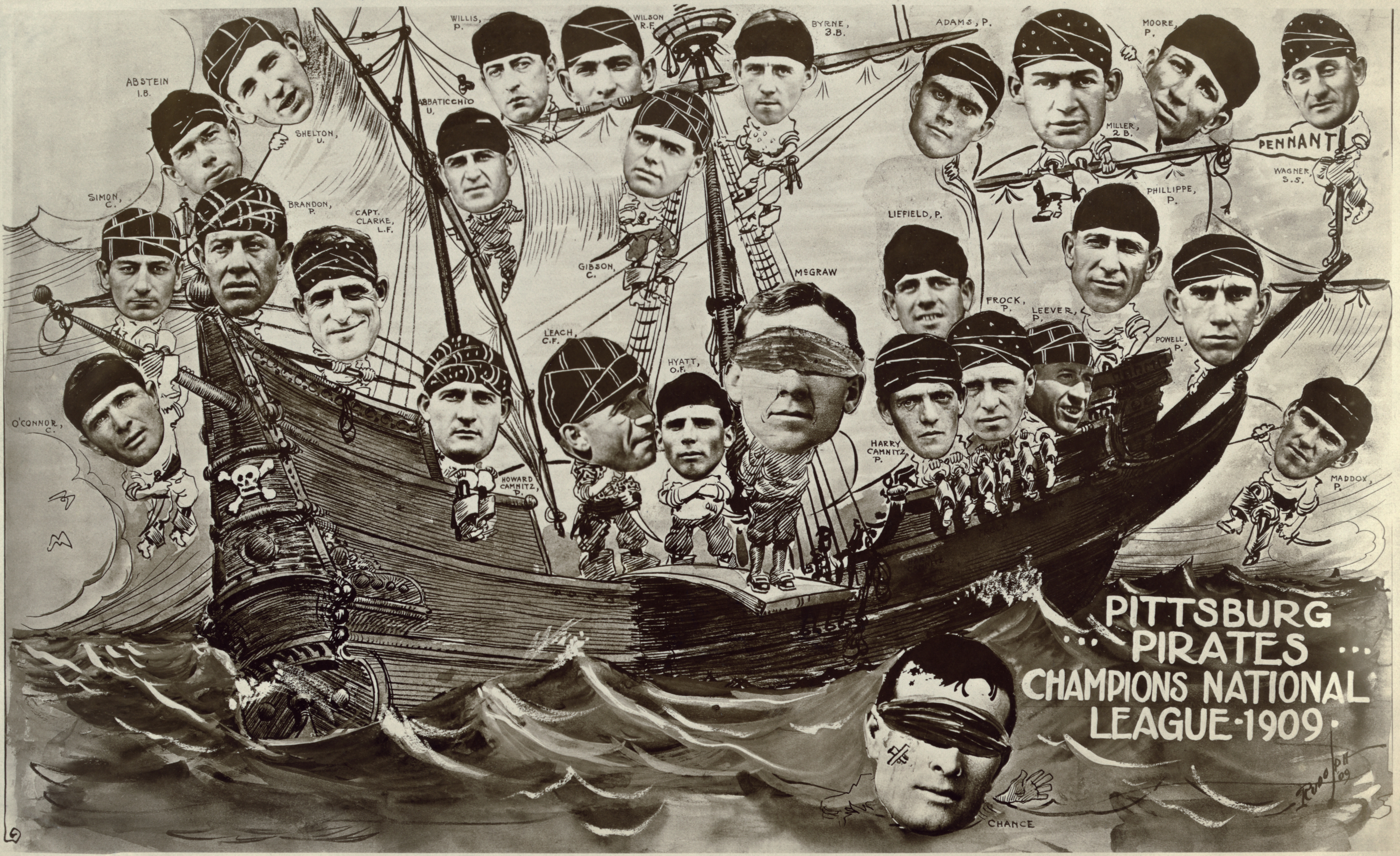
1909 drawing of the Pittsburgh Pirates baseball team on a boat

Teams:

- Professional
  - American football
    - Las Vegas Raiders – National Football League
    - Tampa Bay Buccaneers – National Football League
  - Association football
    - Bristol Rovers FC – Football League One, England
    - Orlando Pirates – Premier Soccer League, South Africa
    - Tampa Bay Mutiny – Major League Soccer
  - Baseball
    - Amsterdam Pirates – Honkbal Hoofdklasse (Dutch Baseball League)
    - Pittsburgh Pirates – Major League Baseball
    - Piratas de Campeche – Liga Mexicana de Béisbol (Mexican League)
    - Piratas de Isla de la Juventud – Cuban National Series
  - Basketball
    - Piratas de La Guaira – Superliga Profesional de Baloncesto, Venezuela
    - Piratas de Quebradillas – Baloncesto Superior Nacional, Puerto Rico
    - Wörthersee Piraten – Österreichische Basketball Bundesliga, Austria
  - Ice hockey
    - Portland Pirates – American Hockey League
  - Rugby league
    - Canberra Raiders – National Rugby League, Australia
- Collegiate
  - Barry University Buccaneers – Sunshine State Conference
  - East Carolina Pirates – American Athletic Conference
  - East Tennessee State Buccaneers – Southern Conference
  - Mass Maritime Buccaneers – Massachusetts State College Athletic Conference
  - Middle Tennessee Blue Raiders – Conference USA
  - Mount Union Purple Raiders – Ohio Athletic Conference
  - Seton Hall Pirates – Big East Conference
  - Southwestern Pirates – NCAA Division III Southern Collegiate Athletic Conference
  - UMass Dartmouth Corsairs – Little East Conference
  - New Orleans Privateers – Southland Conference
- Minor
  - Hockey
    - Nepean Raiders – Central Junior Hockey League
    - Prince Albert Raiders – Western Hockey League
    - Richmond Renegades – ECHL
    - Rochester Raiders – Great Lakes Indoor Football League
    - Tottenville Pirates
  - Rugby Union
    - Cornish Pirates

Pro wrestler Paul Burchill from WWE Friday Night SmackDown dressed like a pirate and claimed that Blackbeard is his great-great-great-great-great-grandfather. Previously, Carl Ouellet wrestled as Jean-Pierre Lafitte (supposedly a descendant of pirate Jean Lafitte).

- Kung Fu
- The music group Ye Banished Privateers recently introduced the sports genre "pirate kung fu" for fans and musicians alike.

== See also ==
- List of space pirates
- Lego Pirates
