= Henry Morgan in popular culture =

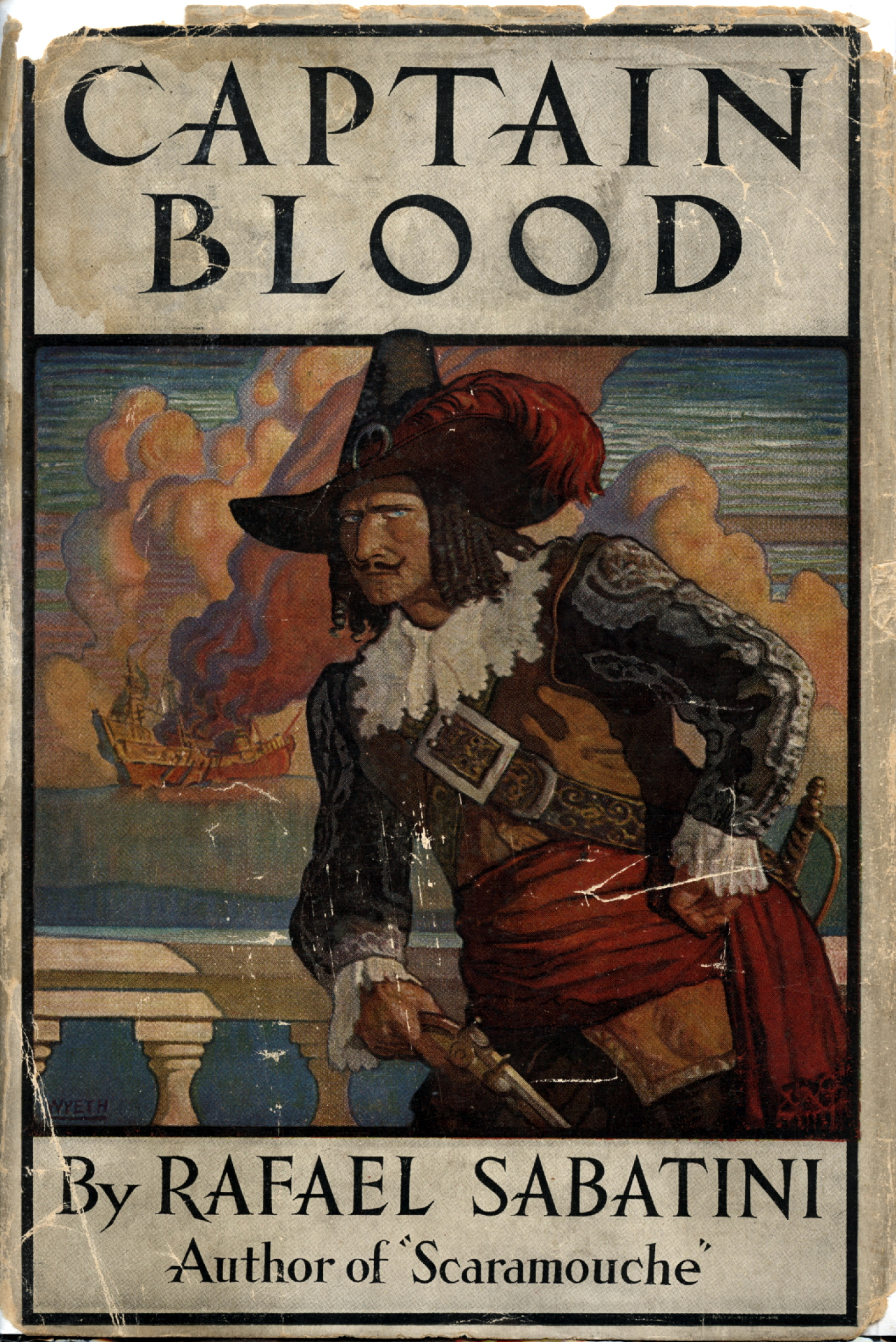
Rafael Sabatini's 1922 novel Captain Blood is based in large part on Morgan's career.

Sir Henry Morgan (c. 1635 – 25 August 1688) was a Welsh pirate, privateer and buccaneer. He made himself famous during activities in the Caribbean, primarily raiding Spanish settlements. He earned a reputation as one of the most notorious and successful privateers in history, and one of the most ruthless among those active along the Spanish Main.

== Comics ==
- The first American Donald Duck adventure comic book story Donald Duck Finds Pirate Gold features Donald, Huey, Dewey and Louie searching for the lost treasure of the Henry Morgan. It was scripted by Bob Karp and illustrated by Jack Hannah and Carl Barks.

== Film and television ==
- The 1935 film Captain Blood, starring Errol Flynn, adapted from Rafael Sabatini's novel (see below), was loosely based on Morgan's life. This film provided Flynn with a star-making role.
- The 1941 movie Horror Island has characters searching for the buried treasure of Henry Morgan.
- The 1942 film, The Black Swan, based on the novel of the same name by Rafael Sabatini, had an account of Henry Morgan after his becoming the governor of Jamaica. Morgan was portrayed by Laird Cregar in the film.
- The 1952 film Blackbeard the Pirate features Henry Morgan as an antagonist, portrayed by Torin Thatcher.
- The 1961 film Morgan, the Pirate, starring Steve Reeves, gave an account of how Morgan became a pirate and was courted by the English to work for them.
- The 1961 film, Pirates of Tortuga, Robert Stephens portrayed Morgan's having set up an independent pirate kingdom on Tortuga instead of answering Charles II's summons to England.
- In a 1965 episode of the TV sitcom The Munsters, "The Treasure of Mockingbird Heights", Herman and Grandpa Munster discover a secret chamber and a clue to Henry Morgan's pirate treasure hidden on the Munsters' property.
- The 1976 film, The Black Corsair, a character named Captain Morgan was portrayed by Angelo Infanti.
- In 2003, Henry Morgan was the namesake of the Morgan Tribe in Survivor: Pearl Islands.
- In 2006, The History Channel premiered the documentary True Caribbean Pirates, which told the known facts of Henry Morgan's life and death through re-enactments. Morgan was portrayed by Lance J. Holt.
- In the 2003 film, Pirates of the Caribbean: The Curse of the Black Pearl, Henry Morgan is mentioned as being one of the pirates who supposedly created the Brethren Court's Pirate's Code, along with Bartolomeu Português.
- 2013 Documentary "The Unsinkable Henry Morgan"
- In 2015, "Expedition Unknown" features Captain Morgan's Pirate Legacy in a journey to Panama in Season 1 Episode 7.

== Literature ==
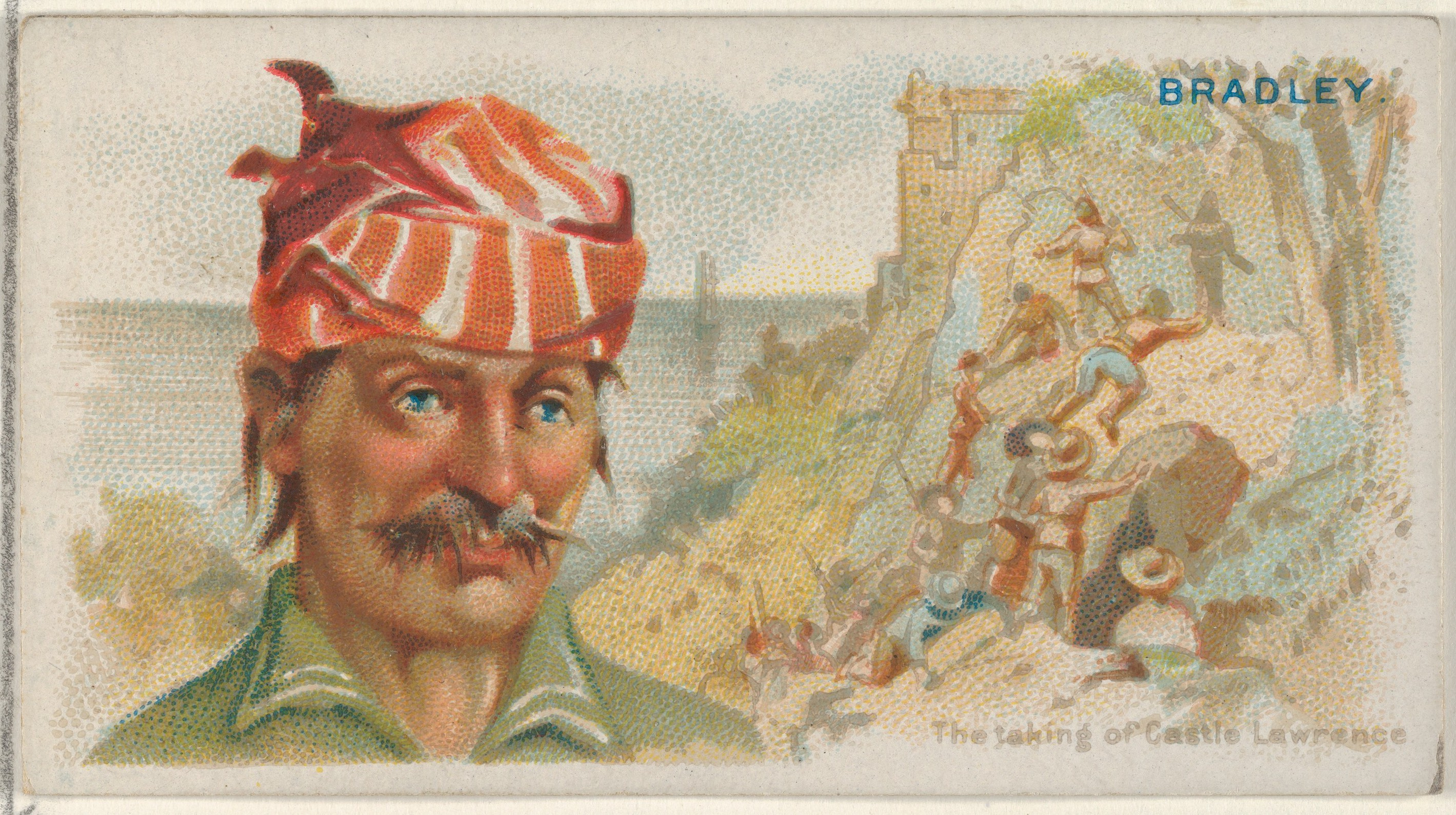
Morgan's Vice-Admiral Joseph Bradley, The Taking of Castle Lawrence (on the approach to Chagres), from the Pirates of the Spanish Main series (N19) for Allen & Ginter Cigarettes MET DP835036

- Rafael Sabatini's novel Captain Blood is based in large part on Morgan's career.
- Emilio Salgari's Caribbean saga is centred on the fictitious character of Emilio di Roccabruna, a.k.a. The Black Corsair, whose lieutenant is the historical Henry Morgan. He becomes the main character in Salgari's 1904 novel Yolanda, the Black Corsair's daughter.
- John Masefield's 1920 poem Captain Stratton's Fancy (later set to music by Peter Warlock) identifies Capt. Stratton as "the old bold mate of Henry Morgan".
- John Steinbeck's first novel, Cup of Gold (1929), is about Henry Morgan's life.
- Book 1 of Nicholas Monsarrat's The Master Mariner has anti-hero Matthew Lawe sailing with Morgan as Mate.
- Doc Savage seeks Henry Morgan's lost treasure on the Canadian Pacific coast in Brand of the Werewolf, Doc Savage Magazine, January 1934, and reprints.
- F. Van Wyck Mason's 1949 novel Cutlass Empire romanticised Morgan's life, loves and battles.
- Josephine Tey's 1952 novel The Privateer dramatised Morgan's life.
- Kage Baker's short novel The Maid on the Shore, published in the short story collection Dark Mondays, features Henry Morgan during his expedition to Panama.

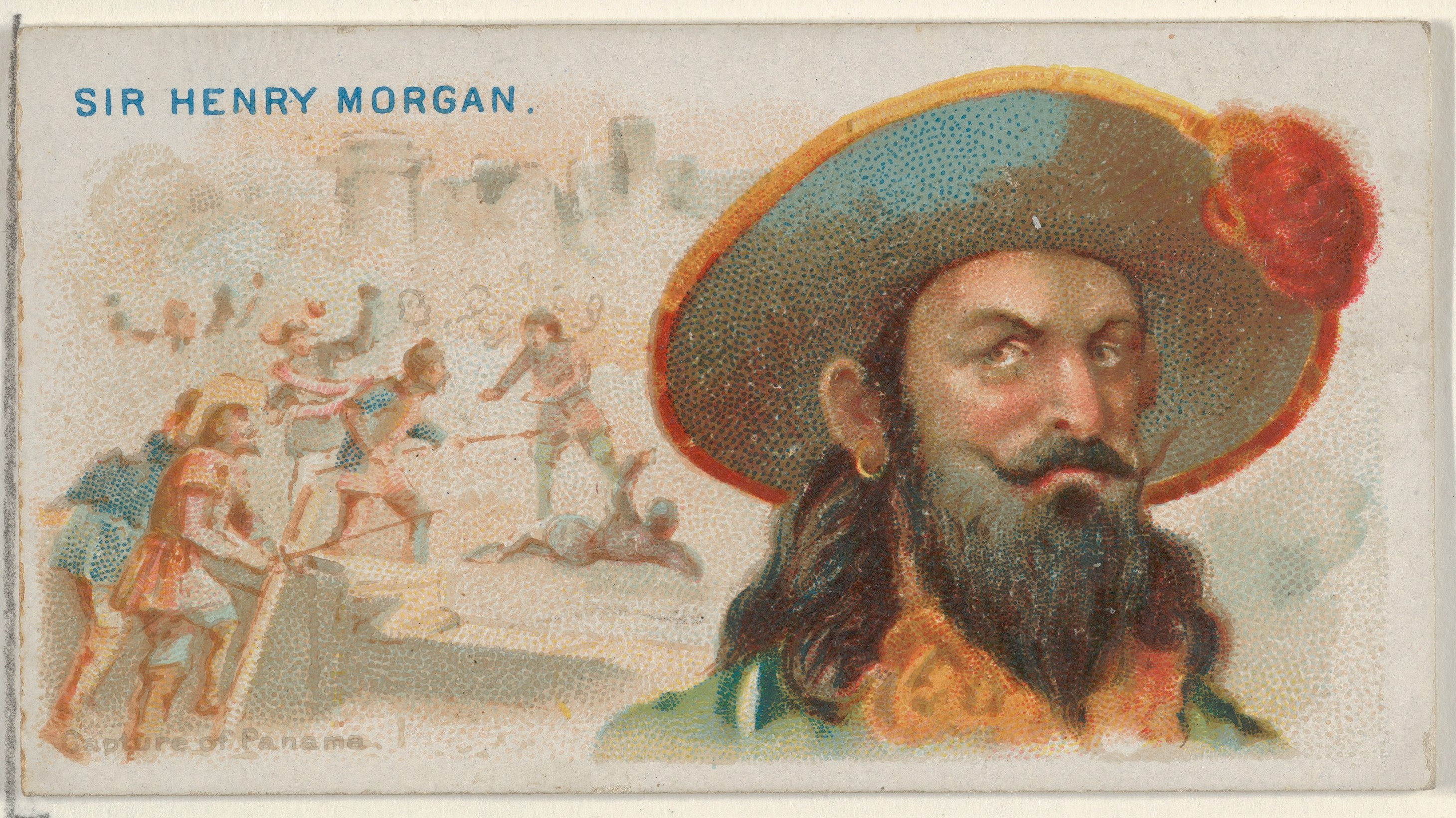
Sir Henry Morgan, Capture of Panama, from the Pirates of the Spanish Main series (N19) for Allen & Ginter Cigarettes MET DP835022

- Berton Braley's 1934 poem This is the ballad of Henry Morgan
- Ian Fleming's 1954 novel Live and Let Die centres round events that follow the discovery of treasure hidden by Morgan.
- Dudley Pope's Harry Morgan's Way: The Biography of Sir Henry Morgan combines first-hand sailor's knowledge of the Caribbean and use of primary documents; noted in the bibliography of James Stuart Olson and Robert Shadle Historical Dictionary of the British Empire 1996
- Morgan is likely the inspiration for the privateer Charles Hunter in Michael Crichton's novel Pirate Latitudes.
- James A. Michener's 1989 novel, Caribbean, features a chapter on Henry Morgan's exploits.
- In Isaac Asimov's Robots in Time, Book 2, Marauder, time travellers met Captain Henry Morgan when they went back in time in search of a fugitive robot.
- In the 1954 novel Deadmen's Cave by Leonard Wibberley, Morgan plays a major role in a hearty pirate tale of adventure, revenge, treasure, and redemption.
- In Nicholas Monsarrat's 1978 novel The Master Mariner, Book 1: Running Proud, Morgan appears in part 3 as a notorious, charismatic Buccaneer admiral, with unstable personality, charming one day and diabolically evil the next day.
- In James A. Owen's novel series, The Chronicles of the Imaginarium Geographica, Henry Morgan is in reality, a Yankee engineer named Hank Morgan (A Connecticut Yankee in King Arthur's Court), who served as one of the time travelling Messengers of the Caretakers of the Geographica (one of his assignments landed him in the Arthurian Age). After accidentally getting lost in time and space, he ends up in the Caribbean Islands and alters his name to Henry Morgan, where he attempts to find solutions to get back to his own time and ends up becoming the pirate.
- Lloyd Shepherd's 2012 novel The English Monster features Henry Morgan.
- He is mentioned in the 2013 novel, Time Riders: The Pirate Kings by Alex Scarrow when two of the main characters, Liam and Rashim, go back in time to 1666 and become privateers in the Caribbean Sea.
- Stephen Talty's 2007 non-fiction work, Empire Of Blue Water, chronicles Henry Morgan's rise and rule among the buccaneer brethren in and around Jamaica in the 17th century.

== Music ==
- "Morgan the Pirate" is a 1966 song by Richard and Mimi Fariña (it doesn't have anything to do with Henry Morgan besides the title, though; it's probably about Bob Dylan and he may be being characterized as a pirate).
- The album Good 'N' Cheap by Eggs over Easy featured a song titled "Henry Morgan" written and performed by Brien Bohn Hopkins and inspired by the novel Cup of Gold by John Steinbeck.
- The Mighty Diamonds recorded a song named "Morgan the Pirate".
- Scottish heavy metal band Alestorm named their first album Captain Morgan's Revenge, and prior to this, had an instrumental called "The Curse of Captain Morgan" on their EP "Terror on the High Seas", in part of the song "Captain Morgan's Revenge", before signing with Napalm Records and renaming themselves from Battleheart.
- Reggae Artist Prince Far I featured Morgan in his song "Head of the Buccaneer" from the 1981 album Voice of Thunder.
- OPM reference Captain Morgan in the song El Capitan.
- Pirate-themed Celtic punk/folk rock band Ye Banished Privateers pay homage to Henry Morgan in the song "Welcome to Tortuga" on their album Songs and Curses.
- In Peter Tosh's song 'You Can't Blame The Youth' Morgan is highlighted as a figure from Jamaica's history who, although being revered, was in actuality a monster.
- The band Wylde Nept has a song about Captain Morgan 'taking Royale' without cannon fire, a humorous view at his change from being a pirate to the governorship. The last verse opines that Captain Morgan will return to his former ways in the afterlife, when he finds there is no rum in heaven.

== Theatre ==
- The play The Women of Llanrumney by Azuka Oforka, premiered at Sherman Theatre in Cardiff in 2024, explores the often forgotten legacy of Henry Morgan as a plantation owner and enslaver. The play imagines the fate of his Llanrumney estate at St. Mary, Jamaica under the management of his widow, as well as the lives of two enslaved housekeepers working at the estate. The events of the play took place after Henry Morgan's death but his name was mentioned throughout the play.

== Other products ==
- The Captain Morgan brand of rum is named after the privateer.
- The Hotel Henry Morgan, located in Roatan, Honduras, the Port Morgan resort located in Haiti and Captain Morgan's Retreat and Vacation Club on Ambergris Caye, Belize are all named after the privateer.
- The video game Sid Meier's Pirates! features Henry Morgan as the greatest pirate in the Caribbean. Incorrectly, Morgan's flagship in the game is the Queen Anne's Revenge, which was historically the ship of fellow pirate Blackbeard.
  - Most mods for Sid Meier's Civilization V and VI feature Henry Morgan as the leader of the Buccaneer faction.
- Age of Pirates 2: City of Abandoned Ships (2009 video game) features Henry Morgan as one of the greatest pirate in the Caribbean, the Chief-in-Command of Brotherhood of Coast, and player can complete series of tasks given by Henry Morgan.
- In the Japanese comic-book series, One Piece there is a character named Captain "Axe-Hand" Morgan. Series creator Eiichiro Oda confirmed in a Q&A section in the serialized manga that Morgan is indeed named after Henry Morgan.
  - Also in One Piece, there is "Big News" Morgans, the president of the World Economy News Paper and one of the emperors of the Underworld.
- In the video game Assassin's Creed IV: Black Flag, set a few decades after Morgan's death, his outfit is an unlockable feature. His sacking of Panama is also mentioned by Laureano de Torres y Ayala, Governor of Cuba, during a conversation with Lawrence Prince, overheard by the main character.
- The 1933 Australian radio series Afloat With Henry Morgan featured Morgan as a main character, and contains many references to Morgan's exploits. It was produced by and starred George Edwards.
- In the video game Caribbean! by Snowbird Games, Henry Morgan appears as a vassal of the Brotherhood of Coast, one of the main factions in the game.
