= John Derdrake =

Danish pirate (possibly fictitious)

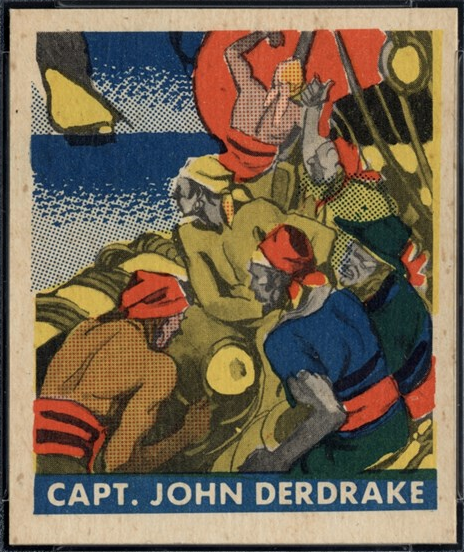
John Derdrake card from the 1948 Leaf Pirate trading card set

John Derdrake, known as “Jack of the Baltic,” was a legendary Danish pirate that might have been active in the 1700s. His story, if true, makes him one of the few pirates known to force his victims to walk the plank.

== History ==
After losing a dockyard job in Copenhagen due to drunkenness, Derdrake signed on to a London-bound vessel as a ship's carpenter. His parents soon died and left him a small inheritance, with which he purchased a brig with a copper-sheathed bottom. Hauling logwood proved unprofitable, so he offered his services to Peter the Great. He was accepted into Russian service, but after killing a co-worker in a dockyard argument, fled back to his ship and sailed again for London.

After selling the ship's cargo he left for Norway but was attacked by a Russian warship en route. He defeated the warship and took it for his own, manning it with 70 English, Danish, and Norwegian sailors and renaming it Sudden Death. They captured and looted several vessels in the Baltic, selling their looted cargo in Sweden. Derdrake was known to drown all his captives, reputedly making them walk the plank. A captured captain escaped and reported Derdrake to the Governor of St. Petersburg, a General Shevelling. One of Derdrake's sailors went ashore and reported that Derdrake had killed the General's sister, who had been captured from a passing ship. She was stabbed to death in the back by Derdrake himself in revenge for her brother's doings.

The Governor sent two ships after Derdrake. They attacked and sank the Sudden Death, whose crew was hanged. Derdrake escaped ashore and settled in Stralsund where he lived comfortably for fourteen years on a luxurious estate he purchased. However, upon traveling to Stockholm, he was recognized and caught, where he was tried and hanged.

Derdrake's story may be apocryphal: there was no governor of St. Petersburg named Shevelling, while Peter the Great died in 1725, and copper sheathing was not extensively used or tested on wooden ships until the mid to late 1700s.

== See also ==
- Stenka Razin (c. 1630–1671), a better-known Russian pirate
