= Cup of Gold =

1929 novel by John Steinbeck

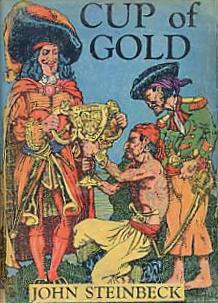
- First edition cover
- Author: John Steinbeck
- Language: English
- Publisher: Robert M. McBride & Co.
- Publication date: 1929
- Publication place: United States
- Text: Cup of Gold online

Cup of Gold: A Life of Sir Henry Morgan, Buccaneer, with Occasional Reference to History (1929) is John Steinbeck's first novel, a work of historical fiction based loosely on the life and death of 17th-century privateer Henry Morgan. It centres on Morgan's assault and sacking of Panama City (the "Cup of Gold"), and the woman (La Santa Roja, or the Red Saint) he seeks there, reputed to be fairer than the sun.

As of January 1, 2025 the book is in the public domain in the United States, becoming the first of Steinbeck’s novels to no longer be under copyright.

== Plot ==
The novel begins with young Henry on a Welsh farm, listening to Dafydd, an old farm hand who became a pirate and returned to tell of his adventures. The old farm hand tells Old Robert (with Henry listening) his colorful tales of the Caribbean, then leaves by morning. Those stories encourage Henry to leave home to seek his fortune. Henry becomes a famous pirate captain with two goals: to capture Panama from the Spanish, and to win the heart of the Red Saint (La Santa Roja). When Morgan captures Panama, the Red Saint is waiting inside the city. The city is easily taken, but the Red Saint puts up a fight. After Morgan and his crew raid the city, they leave with riches and no Red Saint. Morgan ends his career as a pirate and is knighted by the English King, who places Morgan in charge of disciplining other pirates.

== Release details ==
- 1929, Robert McBride & Co. (First edition) 1537 copies sold, yellow cloth binding
- 1936, Covici-Friede (Second edition) Maroon cloth binding (939 copies)
- 1938, Viking Press
- 1976, Penguin Books
- 2008, Penguin Books, introduction by Susan F. Beegel, ISBN 978-0143039457pp
