= Fanny Campbell, the Female Pirate Captain =

1844 American novel by Maturin Murray Ballou

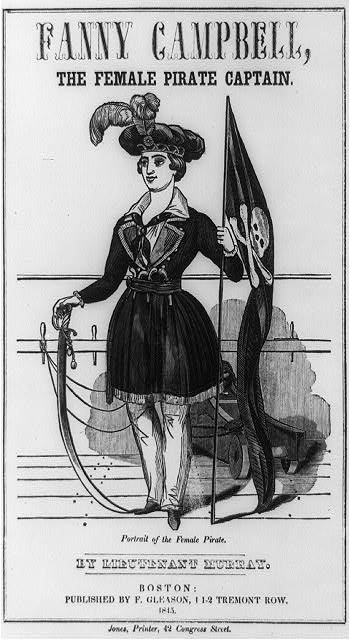
Fanny Campbell, protagonist of the 1844 novel Fanny Campbell, the Female Pirate by Maturin Murray Ballou

Fanny Campbell, the Female Pirate Captain: A Tale of the Revolution is an 1844 American novel by Maturin Murray Ballou, about a woman who goes to sea to rescue her fiancé and becomes commander of a pirate ship. The popularity of its heroine continued long after the book was published, with some writers publishing accounts of Fanny Campbell as if she were real.

== Plot ==
Fanny Campbell, the protagonist, is a young woman who lives in Lynn, Massachusetts, in the 1770s. She has a childhood sweetheart named William Lovell, who becomes a sailor. After his first voyage, Lovell asks Campbell to marry him. She says yes and will marry Lovell when he returns from his second voyage. In 1775, just before the American Revolution, William and 10 other Americans are seized and put in irons by the captain and crew of the British ship the Constance, which sets sail for Cuba. Fanny decides to rescue her fiancé by dressing as a man, calling herself Channing, and signs on as a deckhand on the Constance.

On board the ship, rumors begin to circulate that the captain is going to take the entire crew to England and force them to join the British Navy. Fomenting a mutiny, Campbell helps spread these rumors and then takes command of the Constance, turns the ship and its crew into pirates, and continues on to Cuba.

After she has freed her fiancé and the other prisoners, Campbell asks Lovell to promise not to reveal that she is a woman. On the way to Cuba, they encounter the British barque the George, whose captain senses something is amiss and orders his crew to open fire. Despite the superior firepower of the George, Campbell and her crew manage to win the battle, capturing the enemy ship and taking it along with them.

The two ships stop briefly in Cuba, then capture another British sloop whose crew informs her that Great Britain and the American colonies are at war. The crews of both ships, except for four men, decide to join the Americans and become privateers, fighting against the British. Eventually the Constance and the George sail back to Massachusetts, landing at Marblehead because British troops have occupied Boston. Fanny Campbell and William Lovell travel back home to Lynn. They marry and have papers drawn up that commission them as privateers. William returns to sea to privateer throughout the Revolutionary War, but Fanny stays home to take care of their children. She continues however to shoot, ride and practice her sailing, keeping her cutlass in the closet of their home.

== Literary style ==
Neil Rennie, in Treasure Neverland: Real and Imagined Pirates, calls Fanny Campbell's author Ballou a "pioneer of pulp" and cites his description of Fanny as she is praying:

A painter should have seen her there, her person modestly veiled yet displaying her form in most ravishing distinctness; her breast heaving with suppressed emotions, and her hands clasped and raised to Heaven. Her features were after the Grecian school, with a coral lip that would have melted an anchorite. Where Fanny got those eyes from, heaven only knows, they rivaled a Circassian's. Nature seems to have delighted her with every gift it might bestow. Her teeth were regular and white as pearls, and her hair was a very dark auburn, worn parted smoothly across her brow, and gathered in a modest snood behind her head, while it was easy to see by its texture that if left to itself, it would have curled naturally. Such was Fanny Campbell.

== Publication and influence ==
Ballou originally published the book in 1844 under the pseudonym "Lieutenant Murray". It quickly became popular, selling 80,000 copies at twenty-five cents each in just a few months: Sixteen years after its initial publication, an 1860 ad by publisher Frederic Brady said "Fanny Campbell, the heroine, is one of the most interesting characters ever delineated, and her exploits surpass in boldness and brilliancy the most gallant exploits ever performed. This book is acknowledged by all who have read it to be the very best romantic history of the stirring incidents of our Revolutionary War ever written."

Literary critic Barbara Cutter described Fanny Campbell in 2003 as one of a series of books in American antebellum literature that helped establish the cultural ideal of the assertive, redemptive woman. Margaret Cohen, in the Novel and the Sea, calls Fanny the "female equivalent of the crafty mariner.". In the nineteenth century, the novel inspired some of its female readers to follow in Fanny Campbell's footsteps. Sarah Emma Edmonds decided to dress as a man and fight for the Union in the Civil War after reading Fanny Campbell. Maud Buckley, a captain's wife who eventually got her own license called her three masted schooner the Fanny Campbell, which she commanded on the Great Lakes in Michigan for several years in the 1870s:

The book's popularity created a fashion for female pirates in scrimshaw artwork that continued for several decades in the 19th century. Fanny Campbell scrimshaw continued to be popular in the 21st century, with one 19th century whale's tooth carved with a picture of Fanny Campbell selling for $5,000 at Christie's Auction House in 2009.

Some authors of works about seafaring adventurers have misidentified Fanny Campbell as a real person. Ballou's novel was retold as a true tale in Edward Rowe Snow's "Fanny Campbell, Who Loved and Won", in his 1953 story collection, "True Tales of Pirates and Their Gold". Gretchen J Woertendyke who examines the novel in Hemispheric Regionalism: Romance and the Geography of Genre states that Fanny Campbell was based on actual historical figures and circumstances. "Ballou's adaptation takes the true story of Fanny and makes it strange," she writes. Author Dr. Linda Grant DePauw in Seafaring Women writes about Campbell in her discussion of actual women who went to sea or considered going, including Deborah Samson, who investigated working on a privateer before she decided to enlist as a Revolutionary soldier.
