= Ye Banished Privateers =

Swedish folk rock band

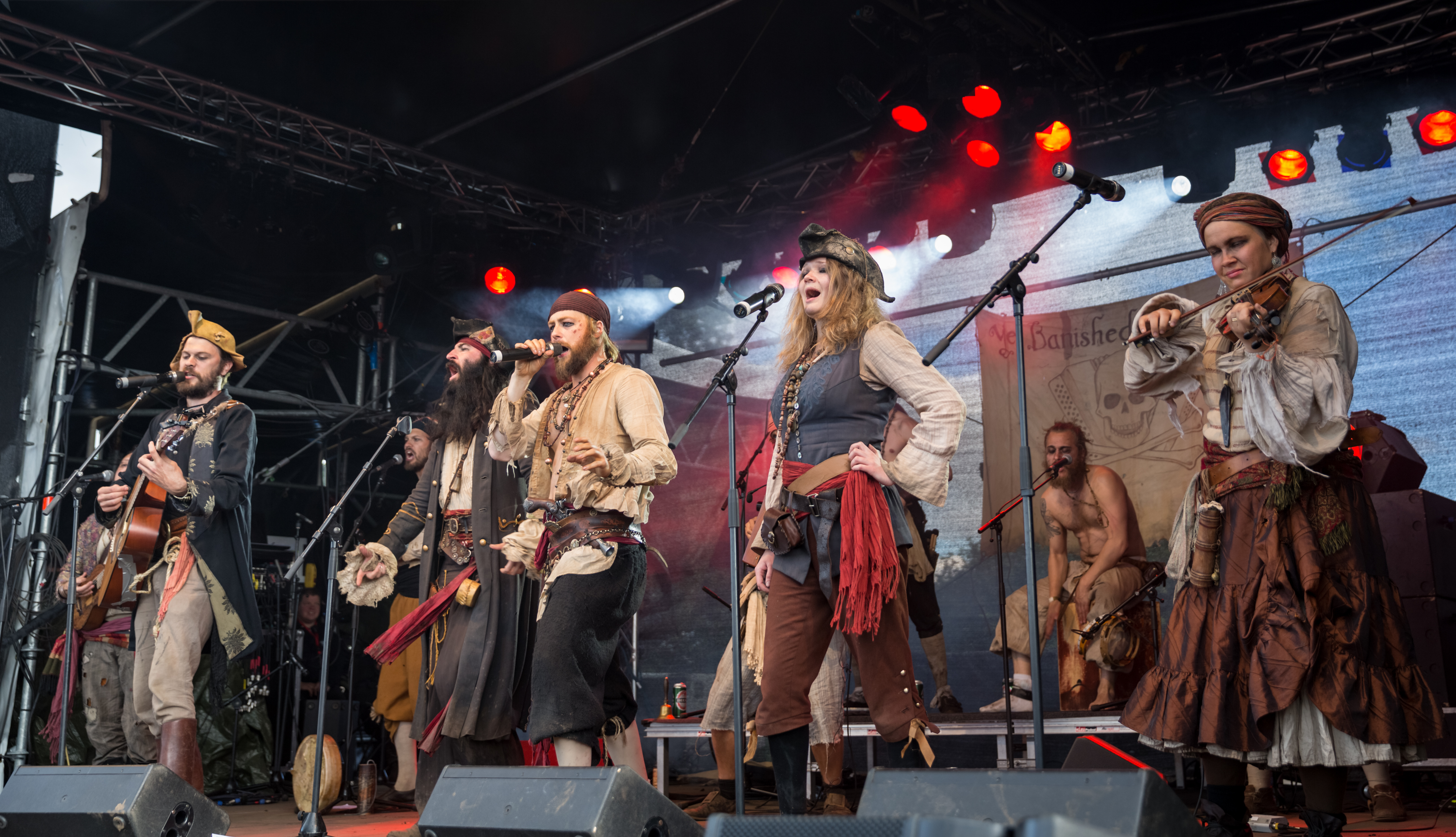
- Ye Banished Privateers in 2015

Background information
- Origin: Umeå, Sweden
- Genres: Folk rock; sea shanty; Irish folk; Celtic rock
- Years active: 2008 - present
- Label: Napalm Records
- Website: http://yebanishedprivateers.com/

Ye Banished Privateers are a folk rock band from Umeå, Sweden.

Their songs are inspired by traditional Irish and Scandinavian folk music and their lyrics are mostly based on sea and piracy history from the 17th and 18th centuries. During their shows they portray a crew of pirates, wearing historical clothes and acting while playing, making the show itself a mix of music and theatre.

== Biography ==
The band was started in 2008 by Björn Malmros and Peter Mollwing, who gathered several other musicians with the idea of playing pirate folk music.

Today, the band amounts to nearly 30 members.

Their first self-produced album, Songs and Curses, was released on 19 September 2012 for the International Talk Like a Pirate Day.

After playing several shows in their home country, they started touring Germany in 2014.

In the same year, on 12 September, they released The Legend of Libertalia their second studio album, on Totentanz Records.

In 2015 and 2016 they toured mainly in Sweden, Germany and the Netherlands.

They announced their third album in 2016, but the release was delayed until 30 June 2017. First Night Back in Port finally came out when they signed a deal with Napalm Records.

In 2020 Ye Banished Privateers released their fourth album Hostis Humani Generis. The name of the album, Latin for "enemy of mankind" is a term that was often used to describe maritime pirates; outsiders of society and a threat to the status quo. Due to the coronavirus pandemic, the band was not able to release the album as planned and live-streamed a concert instead, an online event in which 12000 fans participated.

They released a Christmas special album titled A Pirate Stole My Christmas on December 3, 2021 which featured classics of the holiday with a new pirate spin to them.

In 2025, they served as the opening act for Faun's World Hex Tour in Europe and the United Kingdom.

== Discography ==
Studio albums

- 2012: Songs and Curses
- 2014: The Legend of Libertalia (Totentanz Records)
- 2017: First Night Back in Port (Napalm Records)
- 2020: Hostis Humani Generis (Napalm Records)
- 2021: A Pirate Stole my Christmas (Napalm Records)
- 2025: 'Til the Sea Shall Give Up Her Dead (Napalm Records)

Samplers

- 2013: The Swashbuckling Sound of Pirates – Der Grosse Piraten Entertainment Markt – 20 pieces of Scurvy Seasongs (Totentanz Records)
- 2014: Best of MPS 2014 (Totentanz Records)

== Band members ==
- Anders "Nobility" Nyberg - harpsichord, celesta, pump organ, miniature piano
- Anton "Taljenblock" Teljebäck - viola pomposa, pump organ, brass trash, stone and muddy lawn
- Björn "Bellows" Malmros – accordion, harmonica, ocean drum, dholak, djembe, pottery, tabla
- Evelina Rolon “Harpy”, Harp and bass
- Eva "Eva the Navigator" Maaherra Lövheim - fiddle, octapad
- Frida “Freebird” Granström - fiddle, brass, trumpet, octapad
- Hampus "Monkey Boy" Holm - German style bass drum, octapad
- Hampus "Bojtikken" Larsson - cajón, percussion, octapad, bouzouki, guitar
- Ina Molin - cajón, dholak
- Jens "Wan Chou Zhong" Tzan Choong - banjo, guitalele, sitar
- Jim "Silent Jim" Sundström - mandolin, vocals
- Jonas "Hog Eye McGinn" Nilsson - 5-string banjo, guitar
- Magda "Magda Malvina Märlprim" Andersson - synthesizer, bouzouki, vocals
- Martin "Scurvy Ben" Gavelin - sawbone, cajón, morsing, wah-wah pedal, crash, cripple and roll
- Peter "Quartermaster Blackpowder Pete" Mollwing - vocals
- Richard "Old Red" Larsson - u-bass, double bass, bouzouki, 12-string guitar
- Lovisa “Quick Fhinn” cajó, percussion
- Stina Hake - recorder, dholak, whistles, cello
- William "Shameless Will" Hallin - lead chants and shouts
