= Treasure Island =

1883 novel by Robert Louis Stevenson

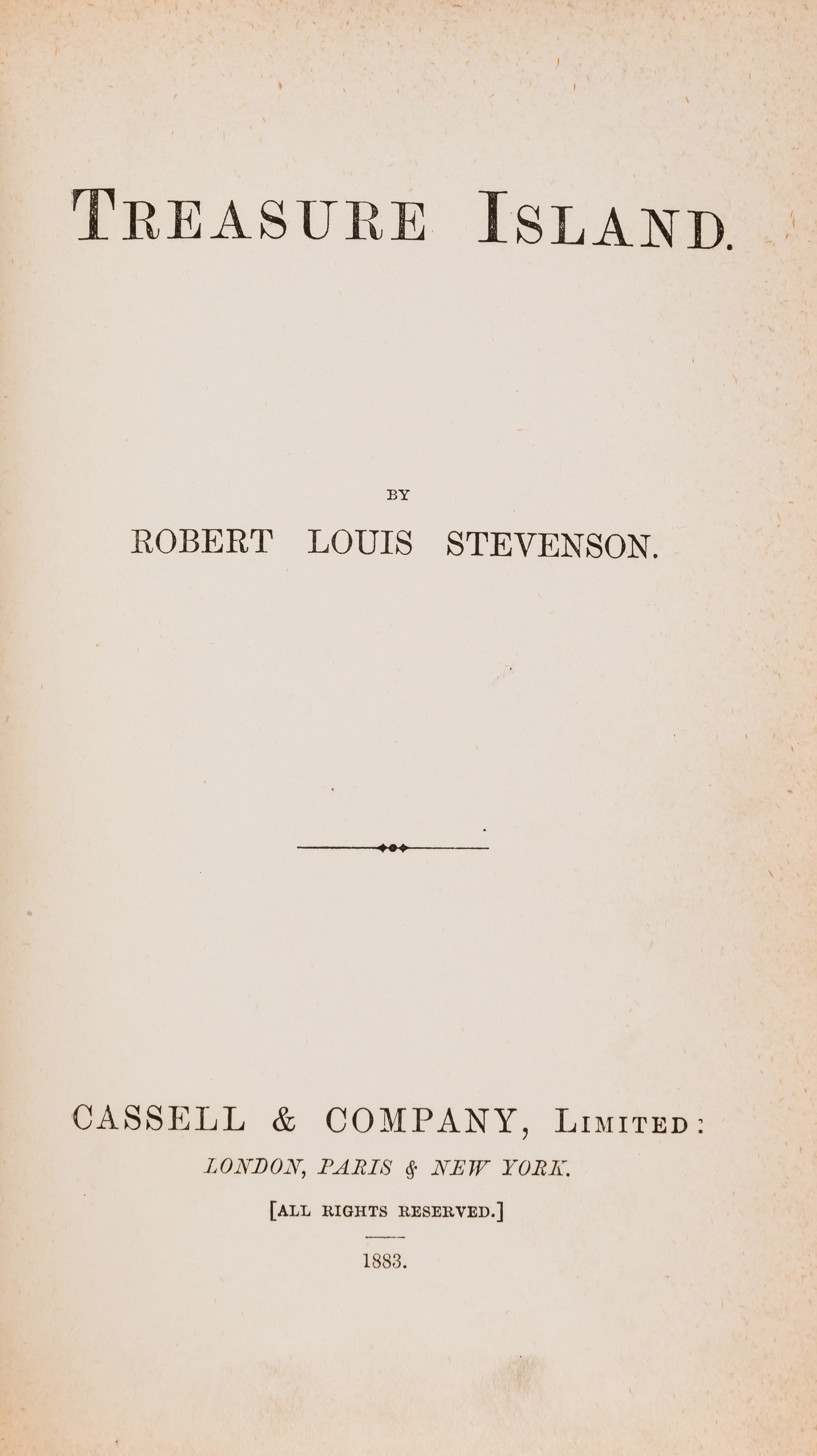
- Title page of the first edition, 1883
- Author: Robert Louis Stevenson (Captain George North)
- Working title: The Sea Cook: A Story for Boys
- Language: English
- Subjects: Pirates, coming-of-age
- Genre: Adventure; historical novel
- Publisher: Cassell and Company
- Publication date: 14 November 1883; 143 years ago
- Publication place: United Kingdom
- Pages: 292 (first edition)
- OCLC: 610014604
- Text: Treasure Island at Wikisource

Treasure Island is an adventure and historical novel by Scottish novelist Robert Louis Stevenson. It was published as a book in 1883, but is set in the 18th century, and tells a story of "buccaneers and buried gold". It is considered a coming-of-age story, and is noted for its atmosphere, characters, and action.

The author used the working title The Sea Cook: A Story for Boys, and the pseudonym "Captain George North". When it was first published as a serial from 1881 to 1882 in the children's magazine Young Folks the title became Treasure Island or the Mutiny of the Hispaniola. It was first published as a book on 14 November 1883 by Cassell & Co. It has since become one of the most-often dramatised and adapted novels.

Since its publication Treasure Island has significantly influenced depictions of pirates in popular culture, including elements such as deserted tropical islands, treasure maps marked with an "X", and one-legged seamen with parrots perched on their shoulders.

== Plot summary ==
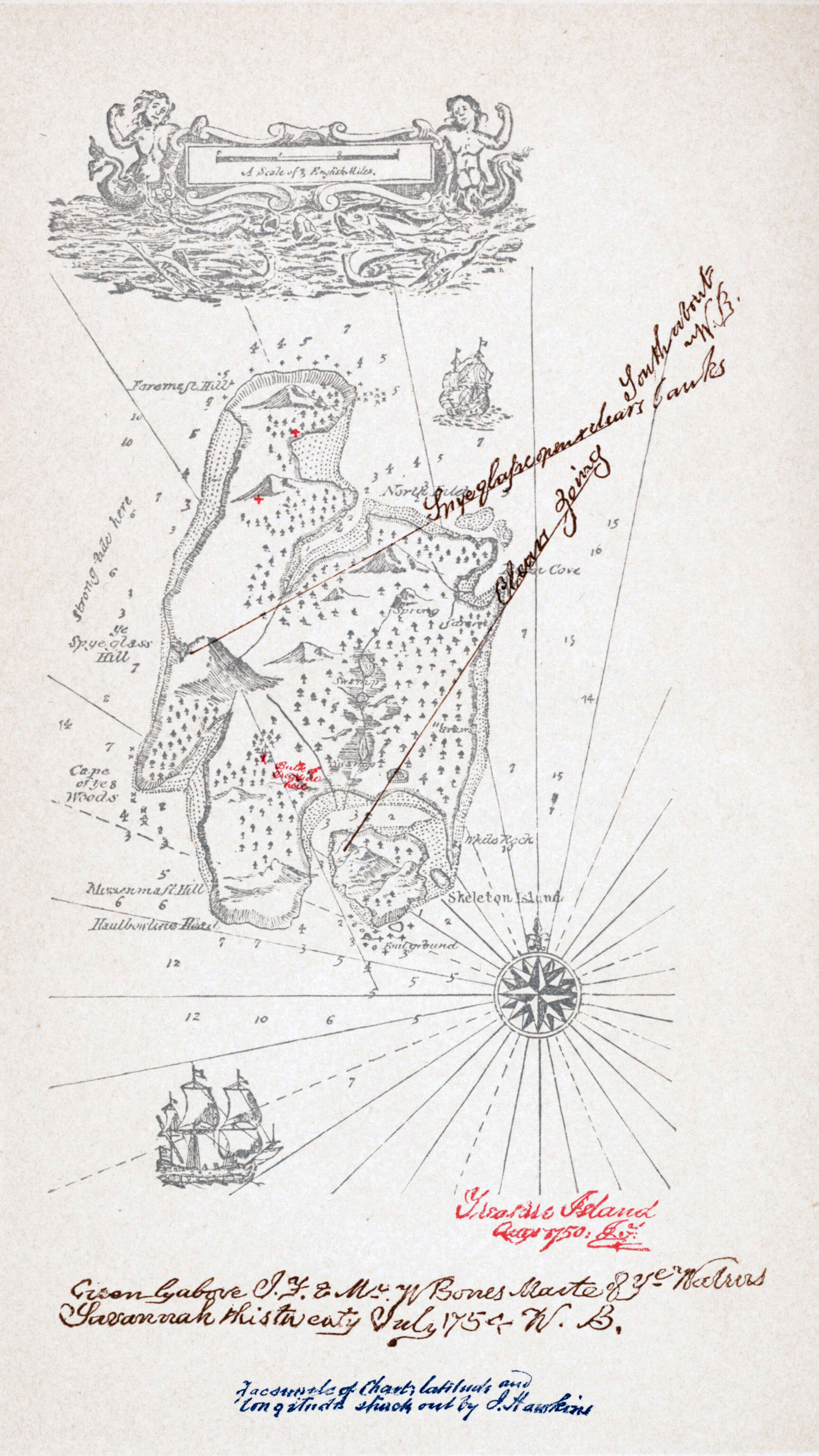
Stevenson's map of Treasure Island

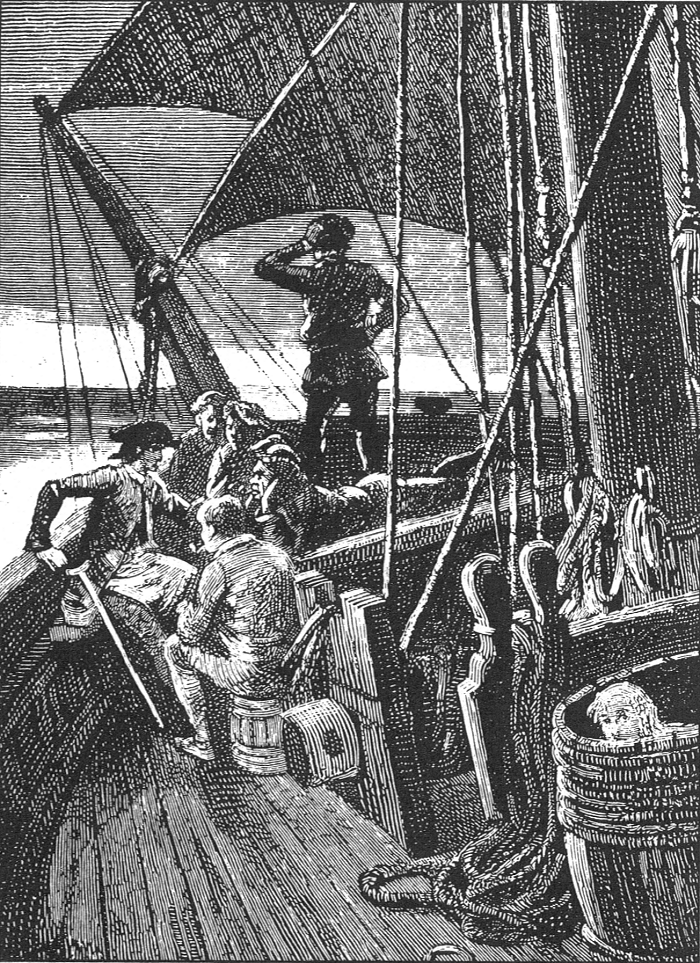
Jim Hawkins hiding in the apple-barrel, listening to the pirates

In the mid-18th century, an old sailor who identifies himself as "The Captain" lodges at the rural Admiral Benbow Inn near Bristol. He spends his mornings walking on the local beaches and cliffs watching for ships with a spyglass. Afternoons and evenings, he intimidates the other guests by singing pirate songs and telling wild sea stories. He tells the innkeeper's son, Jim Hawkins, to beware of "a seafaring man with one-leg".

A rogue known as Black Dog confronts "The Captain", a former shipmate. They argue about the disposition of a mysterious chart, and "The Captain", proper name Billy Bones, runs Black Dog off in a cutlass fight before collapsing from a stroke. That night, Jim's father dies from poor health. Days later, Pew, a blind beggar who is also a former pirate, delivers a summons to Bones which he calls "the black spot". Shortly thereafter, Bones dies of a stroke.

Pew and his accomplices attack the inn but are attacked and routed by mounted excise officers, and Pew is trampled to death by one of their horses. Jim and his mother escape with a packet from Bones' sea chest, which is found to contain a map of the island on which the infamous pirate Captain Flint hid his treasure, called on the map Skeleton Island. Jim shows the map to physician Dr. Livesey who is also a magistrate, and the local gentry, Squire Trelawney, and they decide to make an expedition to the island, with Jim serving as a cabin boy.

They recruit a crew and set sail from Bristol on a schooner chartered by Trelawney, the Hispaniola, under Captain Alexander Smollett. Jim forms a strong bond with the ship's one-legged cook, Long John Silver. The crew suffers a tragedy when first mate Mr. Arrow, a drunkard, is washed overboard during a storm. Late one night, Jim hides when he overhears several crewmen, led by Silver, discussing their pasts as pirates on Flint’s crew. They plan to mutiny after the salvage of the treasure, and to murder the captain and the few remaining loyal crew. Jim secretly informs Captain Smollett, Trelawney, and Livesey.

Arriving at the island and going ashore, Jim flees into the jungle after witnessing Silver murder a sailor for refusing to join the mutiny. He meets a marooned pirate named Ben Gunn, who is also a former member of Flint's crew. The mutineers arm themselves and take the ship, while Jim and Smollett's loyal band take refuge in an abandoned stockade on the island. After a brief truce, the mutineers attack the stockade, with casualties on both sides of the battle. Jim makes his way to the Hispaniola and cuts the ship from its anchor, drifting it along the ebb tide. He boards the ship and encounters the pirate Israel Hands, who had been injured in a drunken dispute with one of his companions. Hands helps Jim beach the schooner in the northern bay, then attempts to kill Jim with a dagger, but Jim shoots him dead with two pistols.

Jim goes ashore and returns to the stockade, where he is horrified to find only Silver and the pirates. Silver tells Jim that when everyone found the ship was gone, Captain Smollett's party had agreed to a truce whereby the pirates take the map and allow the besieged party to leave. In the morning, Livesey arrives to treat the wounded and sick pirates, and tells Silver to look out for trouble once he's found the site of the treasure. After a dispute over leadership, Silver and the others set out with the map, taking Jim along as a hostage. They find a skeleton with its arms oriented toward the treasure, unnerving the party. Ben Gunn shouts Captain Flint's last words from the forest, making the superstitious pirates believe that Flint's ghost is haunting the island. They eventually find a treasure cache, but it is empty.

The pirates prepare to kill Silver and Jim, but they are driven off by the doctor's party, including Gunn. Livesey explains that Gunn had already found the bulk of the treasure and taken it to his cave, long ago. The expedition members load this portion of the treasure onto the Hispaniola and depart the island, with Silver as their only prisoner, marooning the other three surviving pirates. At their first port, in Spanish America, Silver steals a bag of money and escapes. The remaining crew sail back to Bristol and divide up the treasure. Some treasure was never found, but Jim refuses to return to the "accursed" island to look for it.

== Inspiration ==
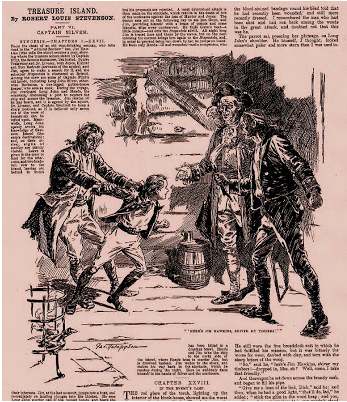
Treasure Island, illustrated by George Wylie Hutchinson (1894)

Treasure Island was written by Stevenson after returning from his first trip to America, where he was married. Still a relatively unknown author, inspiration came to him in summer of 1881 in Braemar, Scotland, when bad weather kept the family inside. To amuse his 12-year old stepson Lloyd Osbourne, he used the idea of a secret map as the basis of a story about hidden treasure. He had clearly started work by 25 August, writing in a letter to a friend:

If this don't fetch the kids, why, they have gone rotten since my day. Will you be surprised to learn that it is about Buccaneers, that it begins in the Admiral Benbow public house on the Devon coast, that it's all about a map and a treasure and a mutiny and a derelict ship... It's quite silly and horrid fun – and what I want is the best book about Buccaneers that can be had.

Stevenson wanted to title the book The Sea Cook. One month after conceiving of the book, chapters began to appear in the pages of the Young Folks magazine, but the editor went with a different title. After completing several chapters rapidly, Stevenson was interrupted by illness. He left Scotland and continued working on the first draft near London, where he and his father discussed points of the tale, and his father suggested elements that he included. The novel eventually ran in seventeen weekly instalments from 1 October 1881 to 28 January 1882. The book was later republished as the novel Treasure Island and proved to be Stevenson's first financial and critical success.

The growth of the desert island genre can be traced back to 1719 when Daniel Defoe's Robinson Crusoe was published. A century later, novels such as S. H. Burney's The Shipwreck (1816), and Sir Walter Scott's The Pirate (1822) continued to expand upon Defoe's classic. Other authors in the mid-19th century continued this trend, with works including James Fenimore Cooper's The Pilot (1823). During the same period, Edgar Allan Poe wrote "MS Found in a Bottle" (1833) and "The Gold-Bug" (1843). All of these works influenced Stevenson's end product.

Stevenson also consciously borrowed material from previous authors. In a letter from July 1884 to Sidney Colvin, he wrote that, "Treasure Island came out of Kingsley's At Last, where I got the Dead Man's Chest — and that was the seed — and out of the great Captain Johnson's History of the Notorious Pirates." Stevenson also admits that he took the idea of Captain Flint's pointing skeleton from Poe's The Gold-Bug and he constructed Billy Bones's history from the "Money-Diggers" section ("Golden Dreams" in particular) of Tales of a Traveller by Washington Irving, one of his favourite writers.

== Characters ==
=== Main ===
- Jim Hawkins: The narrator of most of the novel. Jim is the son of an innkeeper on the north Devon coast of England and appears to be in his mid-teens. He is eager to go to sea and hunt for treasure. Jim consistently displays courage and heroism, but is also sometimes impulsive and impetuous. He exhibits increasing sensitivity and wisdom as the journey progresses.
- Long John Silver: The one-legged cook aboard the Hispaniola. Silver is the secret leader of the pirates. He is deceitful, mean, and greedy, but also charismatic, and his physical and mental strength are impressive. He is kind toward Jim and appears genuinely fond of him. Silver was based in part on Stevenson's friend and mentor William Ernest Henley, an amputee.
- Dr. David Livesey: A doctor and magistrate; he narrates a few chapters of the novel. He exhibits common sense and rationality, and is fair-minded, treating wounded pirates just as he does his own comrades. But he does not hesitate to express his opinions and dislikes openly towards the pirates. Some years prior to the events of the novel, he had participated in the Battle of Fontenoy, during which he was wounded in action.
- Captain Alexander Smollett: The captain of the Hispaniola. He is savvy and is rightly suspicious of the crew that Trelawney hires. Smollett is a real professional, taking his job seriously and displaying skill as a negotiator. Smollett believes in rules and does not like Jim's disobedience, but later in the novel states that he and Jim shouldn't go to sea together again as Jim was too much of the born favourite for him.
- Squire John Trelawney: A wealthy landowner who arranges the voyage to the island. He is too trusting and talkative, and is duped by Silver into hiring pirates as the ship's crew.
- Billy Bones: An old seaman who resides at the Admiral Benbow Inn. He used to be Flint's first mate, and is surly and rude. He exhorts Jim to be on the lookout for a one-legged man. A treasure map in his possession sets the events of the novel in motion.
- Ben Gunn: A former member of Captain Flint's crew who was found on Treasure Island, having been marooned there by another ship's crew three years earlier when they couldn't find Flint's treasure. He is described as being "insane", at least partially, and has a craving for cheese. He helps Silver escape and in England receives £1,000 (equivalent to £105,127 in 2025) which he spends or loses in 20 days. He becomes a Lodge gamekeeper and also sings in a church choir.
  - In the semi-official prequel story Porto Bello Gold by Arthur D. Howden Smith, Ben Gunn was the servant of captain Andrew "Rip-Rap" Murray, Flint's associate and the mastermind behind the capture of the treasure ship Santissima Trinidad, whence the buried treasure was taken. Murray described Ben Gunn as a "half-wit" whom he kept as servant specifically because he considered him intellectually incapable of treachery. After Flint's crew killed Murray and overpowered his crew, Ben Gunn went to serve Flint and fled the Walrus in Savannah after Flint's death.
  - According to The Adventures of Ben Gunn, he was Nic Allardyce's servant and friend from back home.

=== Minor ===
- Alan: An honest sailor who is killed by the mutineers during the landing on the island and whose death scream is heard across the isle. The incident occurs just before Long John murders Tom.
- Allardyce: One of the six members of Flint's Crew who, after burying the treasure and silver and building the blockhouse on Treasure Island, are all killed by Flint, who returns to his ship alone. Allardyce's body is lined up by Flint as a compass marker to the cache.
  - In Porto Bello Gold, one sailor on Flint's ship is named "Tom Allardyce". A lanky fellow with rather long, yellow hair, he is an antagonistic ringleader of sailors opposing Flint in at least two "fo'c'sle councils". Flint thinks they may present him with the Black Spot; he eventually challenges Allardyce to bring six friends and bury the treasure together.
  - According to The Adventures of Ben Gunn, his first name was "Nic", he was surgeon on Flint's crew, and Ben Gunn was his servant and friend from back home.
- Job Anderson: The ship's boatswain and one of the leaders of the mutiny. He participates in the storming of the blockhouse and is killed by Gray while attacking Jim. He is probably one of Flint's old pirate hands, though this is never stated. Along with Hands and Merry, he forced Silver to start the mutiny before the treasure was found.
- Mr. Arrow: The first mate of the Hispaniola. He is an alcoholic and is useless as a first mate. He disappears before they get to the island and his position is filled by Job Anderson. Silver had secretly given Mr. Arrow alcohol and he fell drunkenly overboard on a stormy night. In his BBC adaptation of 1977, John Lucarotti gives him the first name "Joshua". His first name was not stated in the novel.
- Black Dog: Formerly a member of Flint's pirate crew, later one of Pew's companions who visits the Admiral Benbow to confront Billy Bones. He is spotted by Jim in Silver's tavern and slips out to be chased by two of Silver's men (in order to maintain the ruse that Silver and his men are not associated with him). Two fingers are missing from his left hand, and from his first appearance at the Admiral Benbow Inn, it appears Billy Bones may have previously attacked him and caused the injury.
- Pew: A vicious, deadly, and sinister blind beggar who served as a member of Flint's crew. Despite his blindness, he proves to be a dangerous adversary and can even be considered a ringleader amongst his fellow crewmen. He is the second messenger to approach Billy Bones and the one to deliver the Black Spot. He is trampled to death by the horses of revenue officers riding to assist Jim and his mother after the raid on their inn. Silver claims Pew spent his share of Flint's treasure at a rate of £1,200 (equivalent to £126,153 in 2025) per year, and that for two years until his accident at the "Admiral Benbow", he begged, stole, and murdered. Stevenson avoided predictability by making the two most fearsome characters a blind man and an amputee. In the play Admiral Guinea (1892), Stevenson gives him the full name "David Pew". Stevenson's novel Kidnapped (1886) also features a dangerous blind man.
  - In Porto Bello Gold by Arthur D. Howden Smith, Pew fatally stabs Captain Murray, working in concert with Long John Silver. From the context, it seems that Silver means Pew when he addresses one man as "Ezra" just previously.
- Mr. Dance: Chief revenue officer (titled Supervisor) who ascends with his men upon the Admiral Benbow, driving out the pirates, and saving Jim Hawkins and his mother. He then takes Hawkins to see the squire and the doctor.
- Dogger: One of Mr. Dance's associates, who doubles Hawkins on his horse to the squire's house.
- Captain J. Flint: A pirate who was captain of a ship called the Walrus, and who is dead before the events of the novel begin. In life he was the leader of the pirates and they refer to him often. He was the original possessor of the treasure, and buried it on the island. Long John Silver's parrot is named after him.
- Abraham Gray: A ship's carpenter's mate on the Hispaniola. He is almost incited to mutiny but remains loyal to the Squire's side when asked to do so by Captain Smollett. He saves Hawkins' life by killing Job Anderson during an attack on the stockade, and he helps shoot the mutineers at the rifled treasure cache. He later escapes the island together with Jim Hawkins, Dr. Livesey, Squire Trelawney, Captain Smollett, Long John Silver, and Ben Gunn. He spends his part of the treasure on his education, marries, and becomes part owner of a full-rigged ship.
- Israel Hands: The ship's coxswain and Flint's old gunner. He tries to murder Jim Hawkins, who shoots him in self-defence.
- Harry: He is probably one of Flint's old pirate hands; one of those who "ran after Black Dog" at the Spyglass Inn.
- Mr. and Mrs. Hawkins: The parents of Jim Hawkins. Mr. Hawkins dies early in the story.
- John Hunter: A manservant of Squire Trelawney. Dr. Livesey considers him to be the most steady and capable of Livesey's servants to have in a fight. He accompanies Trelawney to the island but is later knocked unconscious in an attack on the stockade. He dies of his injuries while unconscious.
- John: A mutineer who is injured while trying to storm the blockhouse. Throughout the latter narrative he is primarily referred to by Hawkins as 'the man with the bandaged head' and ends up being killed at the rifled treasure cache. He is probably one of Flint's old pirate hands, as his name is called by Blind Pew before Pew was killed at the Inn.
- Dick Johnson: The youngest of the mutineers, who has a Bible. The pirates use one of its pages to make a Black Spot for Silver, only to have him predict bad luck on Dick for sacrilege. Soon becoming mortally ill with malaria, Dick ends up being marooned on the island after the deaths of George Merry and John.
- Dirk: One of Flint's old pirate hands, he was a lookout for the ex-pirates in Pew's attack on the Inn
- Richard Joyce: One of the manservants of Squire Trelawney who accompany the squire to the island, a mild-mannered valet inexperienced in firearms. He is shot through the head and killed by a mutineer during an attack on the stockade.
- George Merry: A mutinous and hostile member of Silver's crew, who disobeys orders and occasionally challenges Silver's authority. With Anderson and Hands he launches the mutiny prematurely; he forces Silver to attack the blockhouse instead of waiting for the treasure to be found. He almost overthrew Silver's rule and forced Long John to take Jim as a hostage. Later killed at the empty cache just as he is about to kill both Silver and Hawkins.
- Tom Morgan: An ex-pirate from Flint's old crew. He ends up marooned on the island with Dick and one other mutineer.
- O'Brien: A mutineer who survives the attack on the blockhouse and escapes. He is later killed by Israel Hands in a drunken fight on the Hispaniola. He is referred to by Hawkins as the pirate 'with the red nightcap' throughout most of the narrative, until Hands reveals to Hawkins that the fellow was an Irishman named O'Brien.
- Tom Redruth: The gamekeeper of Squire Trelawney. He accompanies the Squire to the island but is shot and mortally wounded by the mutineers as the captain's party are relocating from the ship to the stockade.
- Tom: An honest sailor who is killed by Silver for refusing to join the mutiny.

Among other minor characters whose names are not revealed are the four pirates who were killed in an attack on the stockade along with Job Anderson; the pirate killed by the honest men minus Jim Hawkins the day before the attack on the stockade; the pirate killed by Ben Gunn the night before the attack; the pirate shot by Squire Trelawney when aiming at Israel Hands, who later died of his injuries; and the pirate marooned on the island along with Tom Morgan and Dick Johnson (features as Jerry Wilkins in the 1963 sequel Der Piratenkapitän, see below).

== Historical allusions ==
=== Real pirates and piracy ===
The historian Luis Junco suggests that Treasure Island is a combination of the story of the murder of Captain George Glas aboard the Earl of Sandwich in 1765 and the taking of the ship Walrus off the island of La Graciosa near Tenerife. The pirates of La Graciosa buried their treasure there, and were subsequently all killed in a bloody battle with the Royal Navy; the treasure was never recovered.

In his book Pirates of the Carraigin, David Kelly deals with the piracy and murder of Captain Glas and others by the ship's cook and his gang aboard a ship travelling from Tenerife to London. The perpetrators of this crime also buried the considerable treasure they had stolen but most of it was later recovered. They were all executed in Dublin in 1766. In his research, Kelly showed that Stevenson was a neighbour of the named victim in Edinburgh, and so was aware from an early age of these events, which had been a scandal at the time. Stevenson and his family were members of a church congregation set up by the victim's father. Although he never visited Ireland, Stevenson based at least two other books, Kidnapped and Catriona on real crimes that were perpetrated in Dublin; these crimes were all reported in detail in The Gentleman's Magazine, published in Dublin and Edinburgh.

Other allusions to real piracy include:

- Five real-life pirates mentioned are William Kidd (active 1696–1699), Blackbeard (1716–1718), Edward England (1717–1720), Howell Davis (1718–1719), and Bartholomew Roberts (1719–1722). Kidd buried treasure on Gardiners Island, though the booty was recovered by authorities soon afterwards.
- The name "Israel Hands" was taken from that of a real pirate in Blackbeard's crew, whom Blackbeard maimed (by shooting him in the knee) simply to ensure that his crew remained in terror of him. Allegedly, Hands was taken ashore to be treated for his injury and was not at Blackbeard's last fight (the incident is depicted in Tim Powers' novel On Stranger Tides), and this alone saved him from the gallows. Supposedly, he later became a beggar in England.
- Silver refers to "three hundred and fifty thousand" pieces of eight at the "fishing up of the wrecked plate ships". This remark conflates two related events: first, the salvage of treasure from the 1715 Treasure Fleet which was wrecked off the coast of Florida in a hurricane; second, the seizure of 350,000 salvaged pieces of eight the following year (out of several million) by privateer Henry Jennings. This event is mentioned in the introduction to Johnson's General History of the Pyrates.
- Silver refers to a ship's surgeon from Roberts' crew who amputated his leg and was later hanged at Cape Coast Castle, a British fortification on the Gold Coast of Africa. The records of the trial of Roberts' men list Peter Scudamore as the chief surgeon of Roberts' ship Royal Fortune. Scudamore was found guilty of willingly serving with Roberts' pirates and various related criminal acts, as well as attempting to lead a rebellion to escape once he had been apprehended. He was, as Silver relates, hanged, in 1722.
- Stevenson refers to the Viceroy of the Indies, a ship sailing from Goa, India (then a Portuguese colony), which was taken by Edward England off Malabar while John Silver was serving aboard England's ship the Cassandra. No such exploit of England's is known, nor any ship by the name of the Viceroy of the Indies. However, in April 1721, the captain of the Cassandra, John Taylor (originally England's second in command who had marooned him for being insufficiently ruthless), together with his pirate partner, Olivier Levasseur, captured the vessel Nostra Senhora do Cabo near Réunion island in the Indian Ocean. The Portuguese galleon was returning from Goa to Lisbon with the Conde da Ericeira, the recently retired Viceroy of Portuguese India, aboard. The viceroy had much of his treasure with him, making this capture one of the richest pirate hauls ever. This is possibly the event that Stevenson referred to, though his (or Silver's) memory of the event seems to be slightly confused. The Cassandra was last heard of in 1723 at Portobelo, Panama, a place that also briefly figures in Treasure Island as "Portobello".
- The preceding two references are inconsistent, as the Cassandra (and presumably Silver) was in the Indian Ocean during the time that Scudamore was surgeon aboard the Royal Fortune, in the Gulf of Guinea.
- A real life 1800s smuggling gang, the "Benbow Brandy Men", operated out of the Benbow pub in Penzance, smuggling gin, brandy, and tobacco to avoid paying the massive import taxes imposed by the Crown to fund its foreign wars.

=== Other allusions ===
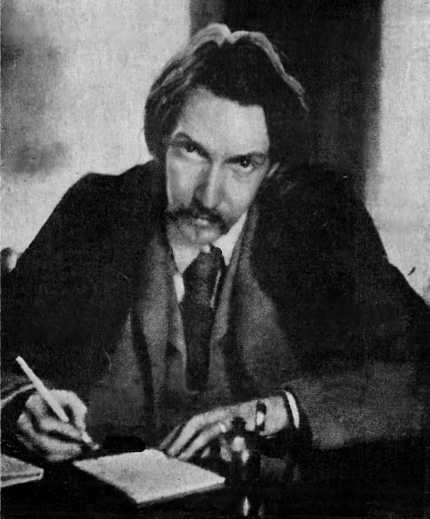
Robert Louis Stevenson

- 1689: A pirate whistles "Lillibullero".
- 1702: The Admiral Benbow Inn on the Devon coast, where Jim and his mother live, is named after the real life Admiral John Benbow (1653–1702).
- 1733: Foundation of Savannah, Georgia, where Captain Flint died in 1754.
- 1745: Doctor Livesey was at the Battle of Fontenoy (1745).
- 1747: Squire Trelawney and Long John Silver both mention "Admiral Hawke", i.e. Edward Hawke, 1st Baron Hawke (1705–81), promoted to rear admiral in 1747.
- 1749: The novel refers to the Bow Street Runners (1749).
- Treasure Island was in part inspired by R. M. Ballantyne's The Coral Island, which Stevenson admired for its "better qualities." Stevenson alludes to Ballantyne in the epigraph at the beginning of Treasure Island, "To the Hesitating Purchaser", "... If studious youth no longer crave, His ancient appetites forgot, Kingston, or Ballantyne the brave, Or Cooper of the wood and wave ..."

=== Possible allusions ===
==== Characters ====
- Squire Trelawney may have been named after Edward Trelawney, Governor of Jamaica 1738–52.
- Dr. Livesey may have been named for Joseph Livesey (1794–1884), a famous 19th-century temperance advocate, founder of the tee-total "Preston Pledge". In the novel, Dr. Livesey warns the drunkard Billy Bones that "the name of rum for you is death."

==== Treasure Island ====
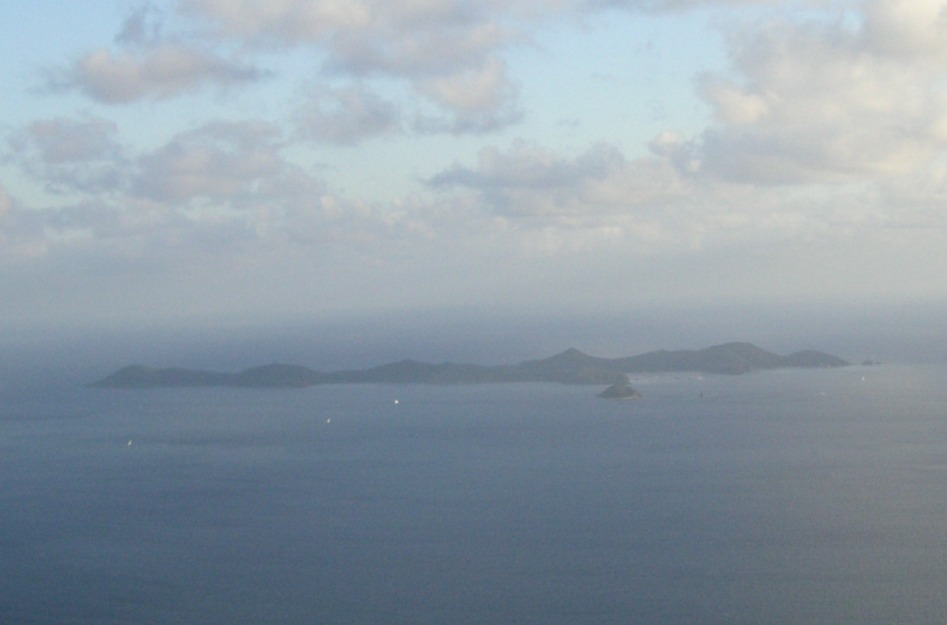
Norman Island

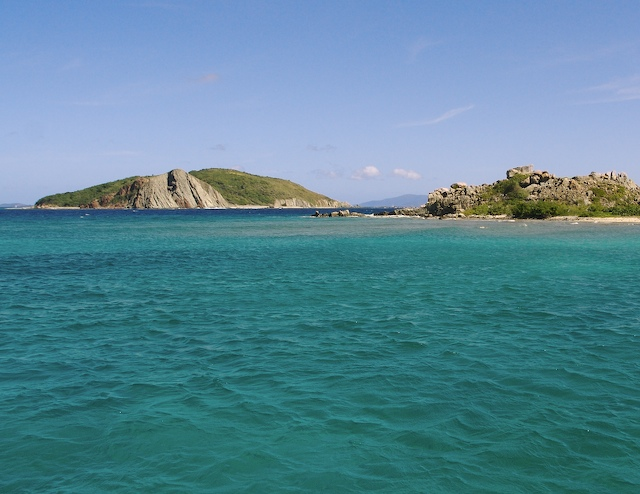
Dead Chest Island as viewed from Deadman's Bay, Peter Island

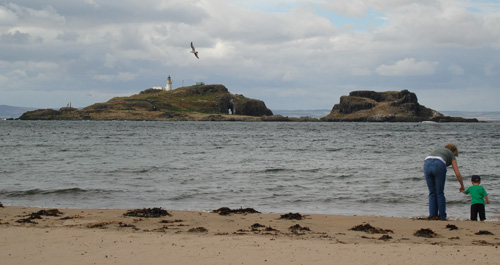
View of Fidra from Yellowcraigs

Stevenson himself never said he based the island on a real place. He did say Dead Chest Island, a barren rock in the British Virgin Islands, which Stevenson found mentioned in Charles Kingsley's At Last: A Christmas in the West Indies, "was the seed" for the phrase "Dead Man's Chest". Beyond this there is no evidence, by Stevenson, that the island was anything other than an imaginative piece of fiction. Nevertheless this has not stopped many places from capitalizing on the name attempting to lay claim as the "real" island. These claimants include:

- Isla de Pinos near Cuba, which served as a supply base for pirates for about 300 years, is believed to have inspired Treasure Island.
- Norman Island in the British Virgin Islands was supposedly mentioned to Stevenson by a sailor uncle, and also possesses a "Spyglass Hill" like the fictional Treasure Island.
- Small pond in Queen Street Gardens in Edinburgh, said to have been visible from Stevenson's bedroom window in Heriot Row.
- Osborn Island (now Nienstedt Island) in the Manasquan River in Brielle, New Jersey. Stevenson supposedly visited there in May 1888 (five years after writing Treasure Island) and christened it "Treasure Island"
- Fidra in the Firth of Forth, visible from North Berwick where Stevenson had spent many childhood holidays.
- Unst, one of the Shetland Islands, to which the map of Treasure Island bears a very vague resemblance.
- R. F. Delderfield, in The Adventures of Ben Gunn, suggests that its real name is Kidd's Island, and identifies it as an outlying island of the Leeward Islands and Windward Islands, south-south-west of Tobago (pp. 119–120).

In August 2022 Mick Whitley, then the member of Parliament for Birkenhead, supported the findings of a local historian named John Lamb that Stevenson had set his classic novel Treasure Island in the towns of Birkenhead and Wallasey on the Wirral Peninsula lying opposite Liverpool. This followed a previous announcement by Alan Evans of Wirral Borough Council that the French science fiction writer Jules Verne had also set his 1874 novel The Mysterious Island in Birkenhead. Their letters of support for Mr Lamb's claims were posted on the Jules Verne and the Heroes of Birkenhead website in August 2022.

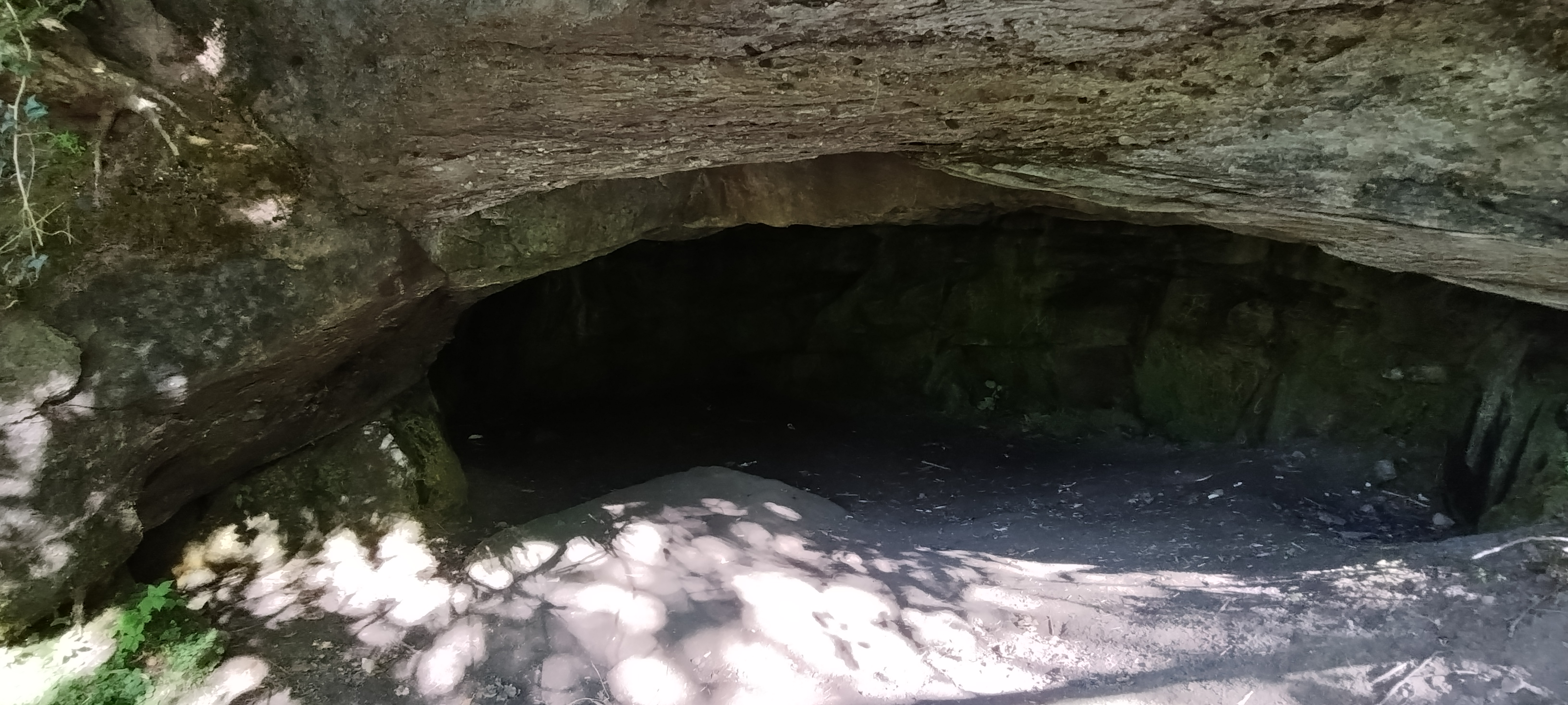
"Stevenson's Cave" in Bridge of Allan.

As a child, Stevenson repeatedly summered in the spa town of Bridge of Allan. "Stevenson's cave" in Bridge of Allan was reportedly the inspiration for Ben Gunn's dwelling on Treasure Island.

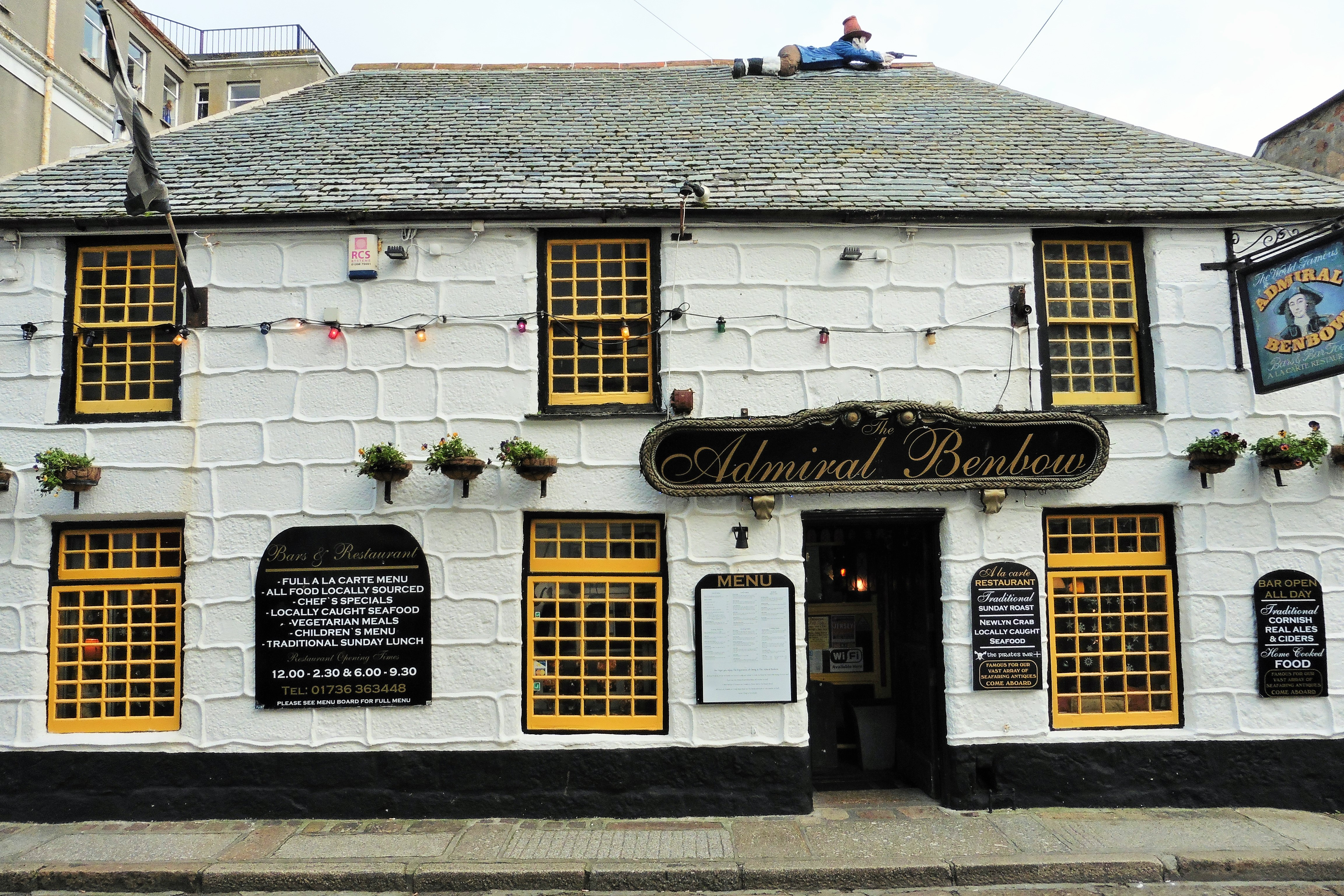
The Admiral Benbow in Penzance, reportedly an inspiration for Stevenson's Inn

Both the Llandoger Trow in Bristol, and the Admiral Benbow in Penzance, have claimed to be an inspiration for the Admiral Benbow Inn. Stevenson visited Cornwall and Penzance in August 1877, and as the inn is described in the book as being in a rural area and it was necessary to travel to Bristol, Penzance's "Benbow Brandy Men" may have inspired him to feature the Penzance Benbow in Treasure Island. The Hole in the Wall, in Bristol, is claimed to be the Spyglass Tavern. Pirates' House in Savannah is where Captain Flint is claimed to have spent his last days, and his ghost is claimed to haunt the property.

== Sequels and prequels ==
=== Literature ===
Stevenson's Treasure Island has spawned an enormous amount of literature based upon the original novel:

- Porto Bello Gold (1924), a prequel by A. D. Howden Smith that was written with explicit permission from Stevenson's executor, tells the origin of the buried treasure and recasts many of Stevenson's pirates in their younger years, giving the hidden treasure some Jacobite antecedents not mentioned in the original.
- Back to Treasure Island (1935) is a sequel by H. A. Calahan, the introduction of which argues that Robert Louis Stevenson wanted to write a continuation of the story.
- The Return of Long John Silver (1949), a sequel written by John Connell with illustrations by Ley Kenyon.
- The Adventures of Ben Gunn (1956), by R. F. Delderfield, follows Ben Gunn from parson's son to pirate and is narrated by Jim Hawkins in Gunn's words.
- Der Piratenkapitän (1963), a sequel by German author Heinrich Rosemann. Two years on, Jim Hawkins, again narrating in the first person, is persuaded by Squire Trelawney and Doctor Livesey to return for the remaining treasure. On Antigua they meet Jerry Wilkins, the fever-stricken one of the three pirates left behind, who escaped the island on a raft after killing the other two and is now looking for a ship to help him secure "his" silver. As the protagonists continue their voyage their ship is seized by a pirate ship under Long John Silver, with Silver executing two sailors in cold blood in exchange for two pirates killed in battle. Hawkins, made Silver's cabin boy, later poisons the pirates and frees the captives, taking Silver captive in return. On Treasure Island, Hawkins is instrumental in defeating another pirate band under Wilkins after divining he would have brought the remaining treasure to Ben Gunn's old cave. Wilkins is killed in the final shootout, and the silver and valuable antique weapons are retrieved. According to the postscript, the captive John Silver was executed on the Execution Dock in London.
- Flint's Island (1972), a sequel by Leonard Wibberley, who notes in the introduction that it had long been a dream of his to do so.
- Long John Silver – Den äventyrliga och sannfärdiga berättelsen om mitt liv och leverne som lyckoriddare och mänsklighetens fiende (1998) is a prequel by the Swedish author Björn Larsson, who tells the fictional story of the pirate Long John Silver, told in first person by Silver himself in a manuscript in his last days of life.
- Jim Hawkins and the Curse of Treasure Island (2001) is a sequel by Frank Delaney under the pseudonym "Francis Bryan".
- Before (2001) is a prequel by Michael Kernan, published in the Netherlands as Vóór Schateiland.
- Sept Pirates (2007) is a comic-book sequel by Pascal Bertho and artist Tom McBurnie.
- Long John Silver (2007) is a four-volume French graphic novel by Xavier Dorison and artist Mathieu Lauffray.
- Flint & Silver (2008) is a prequel by John Drake, who followed with two additional books: Pieces of Eight (2009) and Skull and Bones (2010).
- Return to Treasure Island (2010) is a sequel by John O'Melveny Woodswrote.
- Treasure Island: The Untold Story (2011) is a true-life prequel by John Amrhein Jr.
- Silver: Return to Treasure Island (2012) is a sequel by former Poet Laureate of the United Kingdom Andrew Motion.
- Treasure Island!!! (2012) is a novel by Sara Levine about an American woman who becomes obsessed with Treasure Island (Europa Editions, 2012).
- Tread Carefully on the Sea (2014), by David K. Bryant, merges all the references to Captain Flint into a prequel covering the burial of the treasure.
- Skulduggery (1991/2014), a prequel written by Tony Robinson which features Ben Gunn attending a school for pirates and meeting junior counterparts of Blind Pew and Long John Silver. Originally published as part of the Silvery Jackanory compilation in 1991. (ISBN 9781781124086)
- Treasure Island Comprehension Guide (2009) is a guide for understanding this book from Veritas Press. This is written by Ned Bustard.

=== Film and television ===
Several sequels have also been produced in film and television, including:

- Return to Treasure Island (1954), a film by E. A. Dupont
- Long John Silver (1954)
- Return to Treasure Island (1986), written by Ivor Dean, Robert S. Baker and John Goldsmith, is a HTV television series that features Silver, Hawkins and Gunn.
- Black Sails (2014–2017), a prequel drama series by Robert Levine and Jonathan E. Steinberg, tells the story of Captain Flint and John Silver leading up to the Treasure Island story. The series is said to take place 20 years before the events of the book, in 1715; however this is actually 40 years before the dates given by Stevenson. The series consists of four seasons.

== Adaptations ==
There have been over 50 film and TV adaptations of Treasure Island.

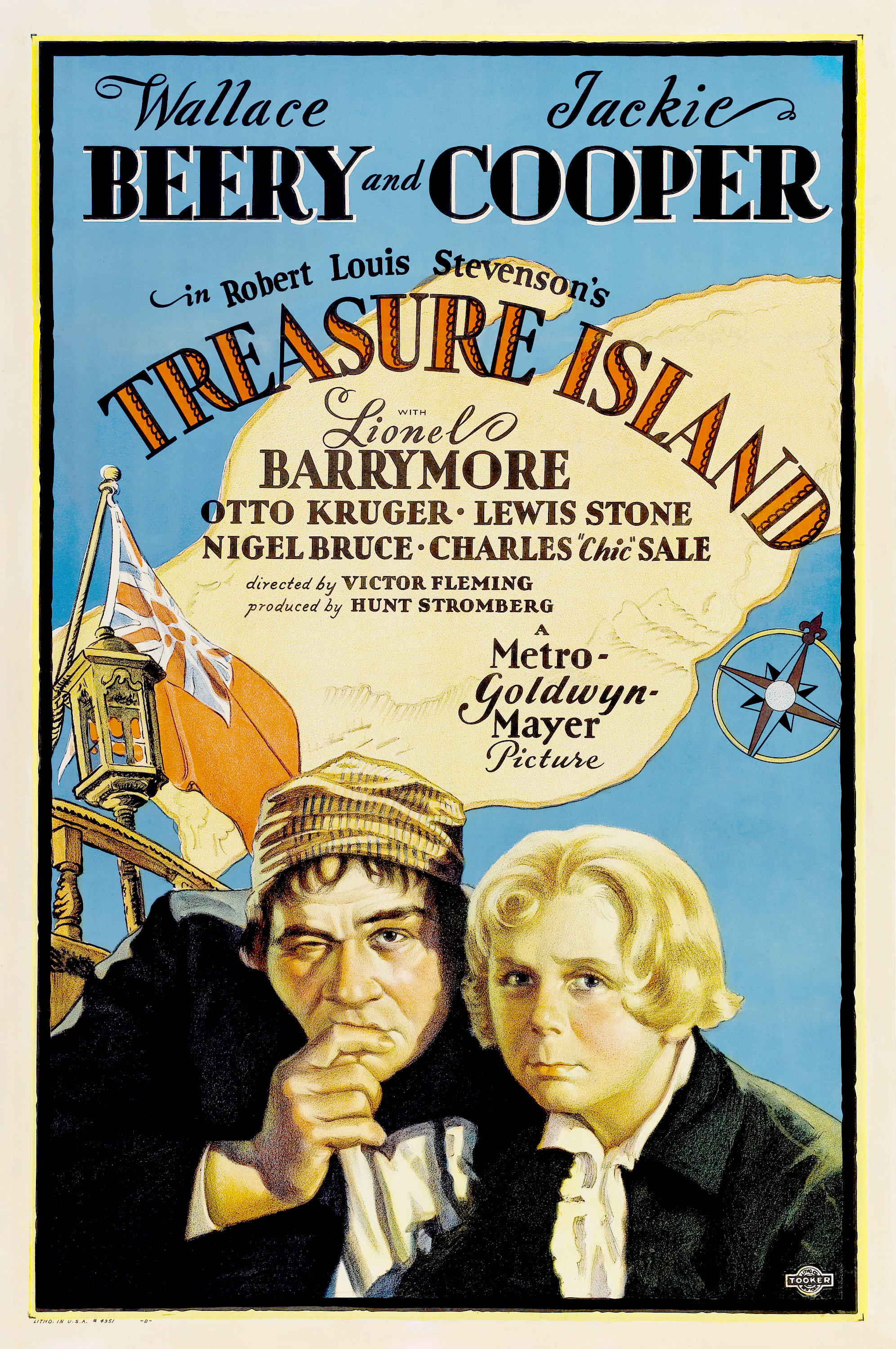
Poster for the 1934 film version, the first talkie adaptation of the novel

=== Film ===
Film adaptations include:

==== English-language ====
- Treasure Island (1918) — a silent film released by Fox Film Corporation and directed by Sidney Franklin and Chester Franklin.
- Treasure Island (1920) — a silent film notably starring a woman, Shirley Mason, as Jim Hawkins, along with Charles Ogle, who had played Frankenstein's monster a decade earlier in the Edison version of Frankenstein, as Long John Silver. Said to be a lost film, it was directed by Maurice Tourneur and released by Paramount Pictures.
- Treasure Island (1934) — the first sound film version starring Wallace Beery, Jackie Cooper and Lionel Barrymore.
- Treasure Island (1950) — starring Bobby Driscoll and Robert Newton, notable for being the first version in colour and the Walt Disney Studios' first completely live-action film. A sequel to this version was made (but not by Disney) in 1954, entitled Long John Silver, which also starred Newton in the titular role.
- Treasure Island (1972) — starring Orson Welles, was produced by National General Pictures, and directed by John Hough, Andrew White, and John Salway.
- Treasure Island (1973) — a Filmation animated film released by Warner Bros. directed by Hal Sutherland, written by Ben Starr, starring Richard Dawson as Long John Silver, Davy Jones as Jim Hawkins, and Dal McKennon as Captain Flint & Ben Gunn.
- Treasure Island (1987) — another animated adaptation, this film produced by Burbank Films Australia and directed by Warwick Gilbert.
- Muppet Treasure Island (1996) — a film produced by The Jim Henson Company and released by Walt Disney Pictures, starring the Muppets. The human performers include Tim Curry as Long John Silver, Billy Connolly as Billy Bones, Jennifer Saunders as Mrs. Bluberidge, and newcomer Kevin Bishop as Jim Hawkins.
- Treasure Island (1999) — starring Jack Palance as Long John Silver, Patrick Bergin as Billy Bones, Christopher Benjamin as Squire Trelawney and Kevin Zegers as Jim Hawkins.
- Treasure Planet (2002) — a reimagined adaptation from Walt Disney Animation Studios set in space, with Long John Silver as a cyborg and many of the original characters re-imagined as aliens and robots, except for Jim, his mother and his father, who are human.
- Pirates of Treasure Island (2006) — a direct-to-DVD mockbuster by The Asylum to cash in on Pirates of the Caribbean: Dead Man's Chest.
- Treasure Island (2027) - another adaptation, this time Sony Pictures will be distributing the film. Ridley Scott was attached to direct the adaptation, with Hugh Jackman set to star as John Silver and Hugh Grant and Owen Cooper also part of the cast. Jack Thorne will write the script of the film. It is scheduled to be released on November 11, 2027.

==== Foreign-language ====
- Treasure Island (1938) — a loose Soviet adaptation starring Osip Abdulov and Nikolai Cherkasov, with a score by Nikita Bogoslovsky.
- Between God, the Devil and a Winchester (1968), a spaghetti western version starring Richard Harrison and Gilbert Roland.
- Treasure Island (1971) — a Soviet film starring Boris Andreyev as Long John Silver, with a score by Alexei Rybnikov.
- Animal Treasure Island (1971) — an anime film directed by Hiroshi Ikeda, written by Takeshi Iijima and Hiroshi Ikeda, with story consultation by famous animator Hayao Miyazaki. This version replaces several of the human characters with animal counterparts.
- Treasure Planet (1982), a Bulgarian animated science fiction adaptation directed by Rumen Petkov. Petkov's idea of moving the action of the novel into space influenced Antonio Margherit, who in 1987 directed the television series Treasure Island in Space. In the English dub, Philip (Jimmy Hawkins in the original) is voiced by Bryan Cranston.
- Treasure Island (1982) — a Soviet film in three parts; almost entirely faithful to the text of the novel. Featuring Oleg Borisov as Long John Silver.
- L'Île au trésor (1985) — a Chilean-French adaptation starring Vic Tayback as Long John Silver and Melvil Poupaud as Jim Hawkins, with Martin Landau, Anna Karina, and Jean-Pierre Léaud also starring.
- Il Pianeta del Tesoro – Treasure Planet (1987; aka Treasure Island in Outer Space) — Italian/German science-fiction adaptation starring Anthony Quinn as Long John Silver.
- L'Île aux trésors (2007) — a French-British-Hungarian film directed by Alain Berbérian, starring Gérard Jugnot, Alice Taglioni, Vincent Rottiers and Jean-Paul Rouve.

=== TV films ===
- Shin Takarajima (1965) — a 52-minute anime TV special directed by Osamu Tezuka and animated by Mushi Productions with the characters replaced as animals. Originally planned as a 26-episode TV series for a bi-weekly program, only one episode was produced before the idea was scrapped and it was aired as a one-off special. It is not an adaptation of Tezuka's manga of the same name.
- Treasure Island (1986-8) — a critically acclaimed Soviet Ukrainian animated film directed by Davyd Cherkaskyi, produced by Kyivnaukfilm aired in two parts, and released in the United States (1992) as Return to Treasure Island. The film's portrayal of Dr. Livesey became the subject of internet memes in 2022.
- Treasure Island (1990) — a made-for-TV film for TNT, starring Charlton Heston, Christian Bale, Oliver Reed, Christopher Lee and Pete Postlethwaite; written, produced and directed by Heston's son, Fraser C. Heston.
- Treasure Island: The Adventure Begins (1994) — a TV movie special promoting the Treasure Island Hotel and Casino.
- Treasure Island (1995) — a made-for-TV movie directed by Ken Russell and starring Hetty Baynes as Long Jane Silver.

=== Television series ===
- Treasure Island (1951) — a seven-part BBC series starring Bernard Miles as Long John Silver.
- The Adventures of Long John Silver (1955) — 26 episodes shot at Pagewood Studios, Sydney, Australia filmed in full colour and starring Robert Newton.
- L'isola del tesoro — (1959) an Italian television miniseries produced by RAI with Alvaro Piccardi, Ivo Garrani and Arnoldo Foà.
- "Mr. Magoo's Treasure Island" (1964) — a two-part episode of the cartoon series The Famous Adventures of Mr. Magoo, was based on the novel, with Mr. Magoo in the role of Long John Silver.
- Treasure Island (1966) — a German-French co-production for German television station ZDF.
- Treasure Island (1968) — a BBC series of nine 25-minute episodes starring Peter Vaughan.
- Treasure Island (1977) — a BBC adaptation Starring Ashley Knight and Alfred Burke.
- Treasure Island (Takarajima; 1978) — a Japanese animated series adapted from the novel.
- "Treasure Island" (1988) — an episode of Alvin and the Chipmunks starring Alvin as Jim Hawkins, Dave as Long John Silver, Simon as Dr. Livesey, Theodore as Squire Trelawney, and Brittany as Mrs. Hawkins.
- The Legends of Treasure Island (1993–1995) — an animated series loosely based on the novel, with the characters as animals.
- "Salty Dog" — an episode of Wishbone in which the eponymous character explores the story in a children's adapted version.
- Treasure Island (2012) — two-part series starring Eddie Izzard, shown on Sky1 (United Kingdom) from 1–2 January.
- Black Sails (2014–2017) — a Starz television drama series that serves as a prequel to the story, detailing the origins of Captain Flint (Toby Stephens), Billy Bones (Tom Hopper), and John Silver (Luke Arnold) during the Golden Age of Piracy.
- Treasure Island (L'isola del tesoro; 2015) — an Italian CGI animated series by Rai Fiction and Mondo TV. It mixes the original work with new characters and mythical elements such as voodoo.
- Treasure Island (2026) — a Paramount+ (United Kingdom) and MGM+ (United States) television series starring David Oyelowo, Hayley Atwell, and Jack Huston.

=== Theatre ===
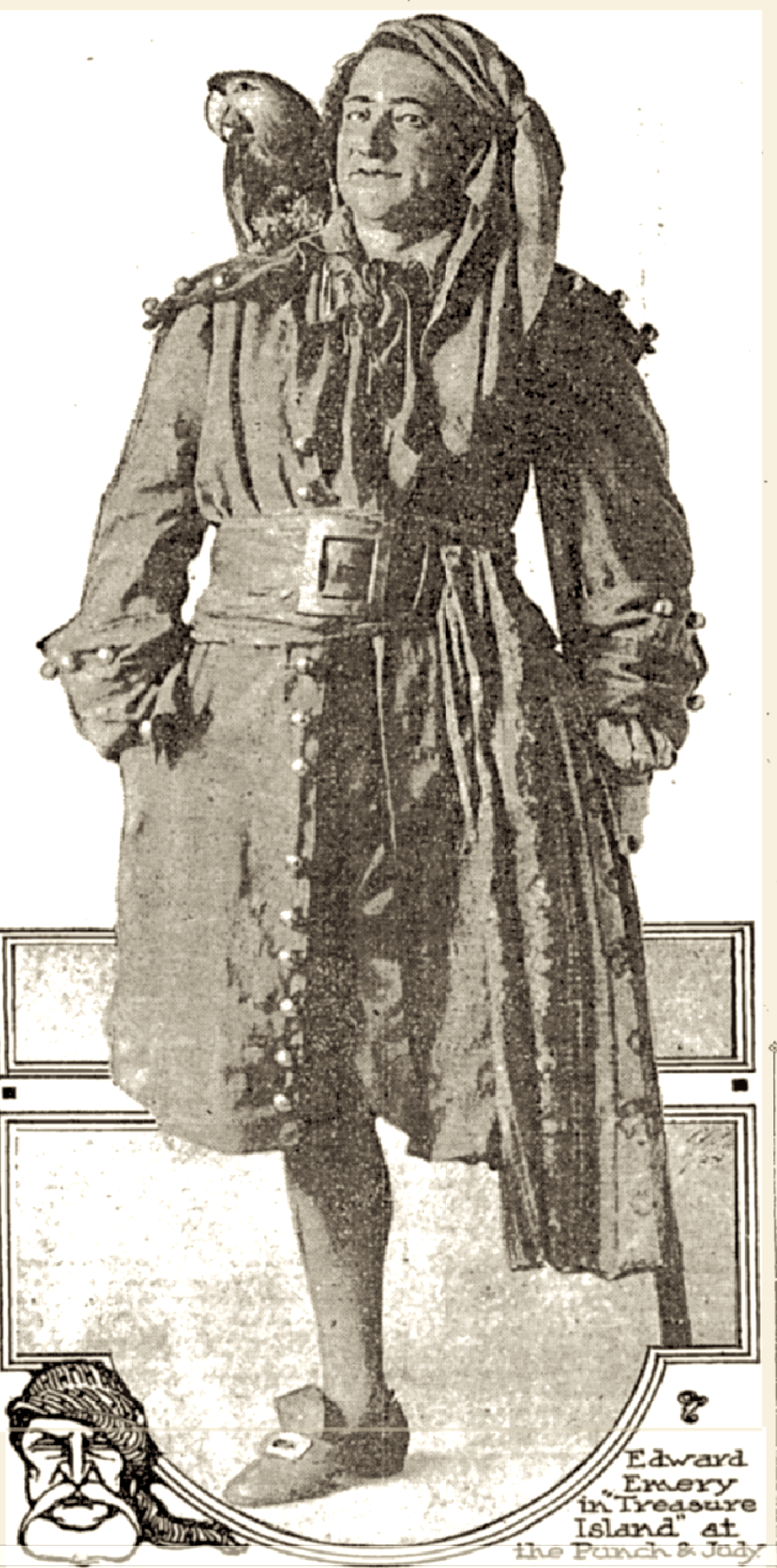
Edward Emery as Long John Silver in the 1915 Broadway production of Treasure Island.

There have been over 24 major stage adaptations made, though the number of minor adaptations remains countless. The story is also a popular plot and setting for a traditional pantomime wherein Mrs. Hawkins, Jim's mother is the dame.

- In 1915 Jules Eckert Goodman's play Treasure Island was staged on Broadway.
- In 1947, a production was mounted at the St. James's Theatre in London, starring Harry Welchman as Long John Silver and John Clark as Jim Hawkins.
- For a time, in London, there was an annual production of the musical Treasure Island, based on a book by Bernard Miles and Josephine Wilson. The music was composed by Cyril Ornadel and the lyrics by Hal Shaper. The musical was performed at the Mermaid Theatre, originally under the direction of Bernard Miles, who played Long John Silver, a part he also played in a television version. Comedian Spike Milligan would often play Ben Gunn in these productions, and in 1981, Tom Baker played Long John Silver.
- Pieces of Eight (1985), premiered in Edmonton, Alberta, is a musical adaptation by Jule Styne.
- In 1986, a Danish language musical adaptation of Treasure Island named Skatteøen premiered at Folketeatret, Copenhagen with a book by Preben Harris and music and lyrics by singer-songwriter Sebastian. Since its premiere, it has been put on stage frequently by several Danish theatre companies.
- In 2007, an adaptation of Treasure Island by Ken Ludwig premiered at the Alley Theatre, Houston; played at the Theatre Royal, Haymarket on London's West End in 2008; and won the AATE Distinguished Play Award for Best Adaptation of the Year.
- An adaptation in August 2009 was run by the Henegar Center for the Arts in downtown historic Melbourne, Florida.
- Treasure Island: the Curse of the Pearl Necklace (2014–15), by Jon Bradfield and Martin Hooper, is an alternative pantomime that included gay, lesbian, and trans characters, and played a sold-out run at London's Above The Stag Theatre.
- In 2011, Tom Hewitt starred in B.H. Barry and Vernon Morris's stage adaptation of the novel, which officially opened 5 March at the Irondale Center in Brooklyn.
- In July 2011, Bristol Old Vic staged a large-scale outdoor production of Treasure Island outside the theatre on King Street, Bristol directed by Sally Cookson, with music by Benji Bower.
- From October 2013 to 2014, Mind the Gap Theatre Company, a leading UK theatre company in working with actors with learning disabilities, embarked on a national tour of Treasure Island, retold with a twist by Olivier award-winning writer Mike Kenny.
- In 2013, YouthPlays published Long Joan Silver by Arthur M. Jolly, an adaptation in which all of the pirates are women.
- A version by Bryony Lavery and directed by Polly Findlay was produced at London's Royal National Theatre from December 2014 to April 2015. In this version of the play, Jim is a girl. This production starred rising actor Patsy Ferran as Jim and Arthur Darvill as Silver.
- As part of their 2017 Season, the Stratford Festival of Canada premiered an adaptation of Treasure Island by Canadian playwright Nicolas Billon.
- In 2018 the newly reopened Leicester Haymarket Theatre staged a new version of Treasure Island, adapted by Sandi Toksvig, as their first Christmas show in 10 years.

=== Audio ===
==== Radio ====
- Orson Welles broadcast a radio adaptation via The Mercury Theatre on the Air in July 1938, with its setting being half in England and half on the Island. The broadcast, which omits "My Sea Adventure", included music by Bernard Herrmann.
- William Redfield played Silver on the May 14, 1948 Your Playhouse of Favorites adaptation.
- Ronald Colman hosted an adaptation of the novel on the April 27, 1948, broadcast of Favorite Story.
- James Mason played Silver opposite Bobby Driscoll's "Jim Hawkins" on the Lux Radio Theatre's adaptation on January 29, 1951.
- There have been two BBC Radio adaptations of Treasure Island, with Silver being played by Peter Jeffrey in 1989, and Jack Shepherd in 1995.
- Author John le Carré performed an abridged reading of the novel in five parts as part of BBC Radio 4's Afternoon Reading.
- Treasure Island 2020 (November 12, 2018 – January 12, 2020) is a 10-part BYU Radio radio adaptation broadcast via The Apple Seed. The audio adventure places the main trio of kids in 2019 and turns it into a time-traveling adventure that involves both them going to the past to look for treasures and Long John Silver, Billy Bones, and others coming to the present through the time vortex. The series is now available as a free podcast.

==== Other audio recordings ====
- Basil Rathbone starred as both The Narrator and Silver, with Dix Davis as Jim Hawkins, in a 1944 audio recording for Columbia Masterworks Records.
- James Kenney played Jim Hawkins and Anthony Woodruff played Long John Silver in the Tale Spinners for Children audio adaptation of Treasure Island (United Artists Records, UAC 11013).
- A 2013 Big Finish Productions audiobook adaptation of Treasure Island was written and directed by Barnaby Edwards and starred Tom Baker as Long John Silver, Nicholas Farrell as the Narrator, and Edward Holtom as Jim Hawkins.
- The King Arthur/Treasure Island album features a 15 minutes long adaptation of the novel with Captain Flint replacing Billy Bones as the holder of the map.
- There is also a 30-minute recording of the novel with a more expanded version of the plot. Both these albums feature different orchestration of the song "Fifteen men on a Dead man's chest", and the 30 minute version features a song about Long John Silver's parrot, Captain Flint.
- A recent adaptation made in 2026, Treasure Island: A Telling for the New World is an 8-hour cinematic audio drama produced by Otherworld Media. Rritten and directed by Orson Ossman, it resets the classic Robert Louis Stevenson adventure in the 1828 American South, specifically the Louisiana bayous, the Port of New Orleans, and the Caribbean. The star-studded, all-American voice cast features Keith David as Long John Silver, John Goodman as Billy Bones, and Glynn Turman as the storyteller/older Jim Hawkins. It also features an original score by Taj Mahal and sound design supervised by Skywalker Sound's Randy Thom.

=== Books and comics ===
- Famous Stories #1 (1942, Dell Comics) — sixty pages, drawn by Robert Bugg
- Shin Takarajima (1947) — a loose adaptation of Treasure Island by Sakai Shichima and Osamu Tezuka
- Classics Illustrated #64 (Oct. 1949, Gilberton) — adapted by Ken Fitch and Alex A. Blum
- "Walt Disney's Treasure Island", Four Color #624 (April 1955, Dell Comics) — adapted by John Ushler from Disney's 1950 film adaptation
- "La isla del tesoro", Joyas Literarias Juveniles #2 (1970, Editorial Bruguera) — adapted by José Antonio Vidal Sales and Alfonso Cerón Nuñez; translated and reprinted as "Treasure Island", King Classics #7 (1977, King Features)
- Pendulum Illustrated Classics (1973, Pendulum Press) — adapted by John Norwood Fago and Nardo Cruz
- Marvel Classics Comics #15 (1976, Marvel Comics) — adapted by Bill Mantlo and Dino Castrillo; re-issued by Fisher-Price in 1984
- Godspeed (1993) — a science-fictional novel by Charles Sheffield that recasts the search for pirate treasure as the search for lost faster-than-light drive technology
- Robert Louis Stevenson's Treasure Island: The Graphic Novel (2005, Penguin Books) — adapted by Tim Hamilton
- Robert Louis Stevenson's Treasure Island (2007, Capstone Publishers) — adapted by Greg Rebis
- Treasure Island #1–6, Marvel Illustrated (Aug. 2007–Jan. 2008, Marvel Comics) — adapted by Roy Thomas, Mario Gully, and Pat Davidson
- L'Île au trésor, de Robert Louis Stevenson (2007–2009, Delcourt) — adapted by David Chauvel and Fred Simon; translated and reprinted as Papercutz Classics Illustrated Series #5 (2010, Papercutz)
- Disney Treasure Island, Starring Mickey Mouse (Oct. 2018, Dark Horse Comics) — adapted by Teresa Radice, Erin Brady (translation), and Stefano Turconi

=== Music ===
- The self-titled Ben Gunn Society album released in 2003 presents the story centered on the character of Ben Gunn, based primarily on Chapter XV, "Man of the Island", and other relevant parts of the book.
- "Treasure Island" (1992) is a song by Running Wild, from their Pile of Skulls album, that tells the novel's story.
- Scottish glam rock artists The Sensational Alex Harvey Band paid tribute to the book with their 1974 song "The Tomahawk Kid". The song names many of Treasure Island's characters in its lyrics, and was often dedicated to Robert Louis Stevenson in live performance.
- "I'm Still Here (Jim's Theme)" and "Always Know Where You Are" are songs performed by Goo Goo Dolls frontman John Rzeznik for Disney's animated retelling.
- The Cursed Island (2014) is an album by Skull & Bones that is based on Treasure Island.
- "Dead Man's Sea Shanty" by artist Chonny Jash is a retelling of the story of Treasure Island as a sea shanty, heavily utilising a rearrangement of "Dead Man's Chest".
- Treasure Island (2025) is a suite for orchestra composed by Andrea Montepaone and published by Telecinesound Records in which the events of the novel are described through 13 pieces.

=== Video games ===
- Treasure Island (1984) is a graphic adventure video game based loosely on the novel. It was written by Greg Duddle, published by Mr. Micro (and often rebranded by Commodore) on the Commodore 16, Plus/4, Commodore 64, and ZX Spectrum. In the game, the player takes the part of Jim Hawkins travelling around the island dispatching pirates with cutlasses before getting the treasure and being chased back to the ship by Long John Silver.
- Treasure Island (1985) is an adventure game based upon the novel published by Windham Classics.
- Captain Silver (1987) is an arcade game that follows its protagonist, Jim Aykroyd, in his quest to find Captain Silver's hidden treasure, for which he must battle an undead Captain Silver in order to find.
- La Isla del Tesoro de R. L. Stevenson (1999) is a point-and-click adventure game based upon the novel developed, edited, and published by Barcelona Multimedia.
- Monkey Island, a LucasArts adventure game, is partly based on Treasure Island, lending many of its plot points and characters and using many humorous references to the book.
- Treasure Planet: Battle at Procyon is one of the various video games released by Disney based on their animated film Treasure Planet.
- Treasure Island (2010) is a hidden objects game launched by French publisher Anuman Interactive.

== References in popular culture ==
- The Strong Winds series of children's adventures by Julia Jones draws freely from events and names in Treasure Island.
- In the Swallows and Amazons series by Arthur Ransome, the Blacketts' Uncle Jim has the nickname of Captain Flint and a parrot.
- In J.M. Barrie's Peter Pan, Captain Hook is mentioned as being the only pirate that Long John Silver, also known as "Barbecue", feared.
- A 1960 episode of Dennis the Menace is centered around the pursuit of buried treasure, inspired by Mr. Wilson reading his childhood copy of Treasure Island to Dennis and his friends.
- The book is referenced by Bart Simpson in The Simpsons episode "Bart Gets an F".
- Treasure Island According to Spike Milligan (2000) is a parody by Spike Milligan.
- At the beginning of a fifth-season episode of Arthur titled "You Are Arthur" (2000), the titular character is seen reading Treasure Island.
- In an episode of Survivor: Heroes vs. Villains, titled "Jumping Ship" (2010), the castaways Amanda, Colby and Danielle win an overnight trip to the former home of Robert Louis Stevenson and a screening of the 1934 version of Treasure Island.
- In The Way Back (2010), one of the prisoners in the Russian gulag briefly narrates some of Treasure Island to his fellow inmates. He mentions the characters Jim and Long John Silver.
- In the teen fiction novel One for Sorrow (2015, Fledgling Press) by Philip Caveney, the main character, Tom Afflick, is reading Treasure Island which serves as the catalyst for his adventure.
- In Blade Runner 2049 (2017), Rick Deckard makes a continued allusion to Treasure Island upon first meeting the protagonist; in the scene, he explicitly references Ben Gunn's craving for cheese.
- In Solo: A Star Wars Story, Woody Harrelson's character Tobias Beckett is based on Long John Silver.
- In the finale of Season 3 of The Handmaid's Tale (2019), Commander Lawrence reads an excerpt of Treasure Island to a group of runaway children.

=== Pirates of the Caribbean ===
Disney's Pirates of the Caribbean franchise references Treasure Island many times. In the 2006 revamp of the original attraction, the island port was officially named Isla Tesoro, with the Spanish translation of Treasure Island is La isla del tesoro. In making Pirates of the Caribbean: The Curse of the Black Pearl, Treasure Island was one of many inspirations behind making the film, noted by the filmmakers like producer Jerry Bruckheimer, who regarded the 1950 Walt Disney Studio feature.

In writing Captain Jack Sparrow, screenwriters Ted Elliott and Terry Rossio took from their experience on Treasure Planet, and asked the question, "Is Long John Silver a delightful Falstaffian character or a contemptible villain?" Hector Barbossa's pet monkey, named "Jack" after Jack Sparrow, is a reference to Long John Silver's pet parrot Captain Flint. Both animals are named after their owner's former captain.

Of the films in the series, Dead Man's Chest features the most references.

- Joshamee Gibbs sings "Dead Man's Chest", a song from the novel, which served as the original opening in an earlier version of the film.
- Jack Sparrow is given the Black Spot by Bootstrap Bill Turner as a marker that the Kraken can track.
- Governor Weatherby Swann witnesses Mercer kill the captain, who was intended to be called "Captain Hawkins", as revealed by screenwriters Ted Elliott and Terry Rossio on the film's DVD commentary. Hawkins' backstory was intended to relate to that of Jim Hawkins' father in Treasure Island, explaining the circumstances of his father's disappearance at sea and why he never returned to the Admiral Benbow Inn.
- The merchant ship the Edinburgh Trader was played by the Bounty, a ship replica which played the Hispaniola in the 1990 movie adaptation of the novel.

Pirates of the Caribbean: On Stranger Tides has Hector Barbossa begin wearing a wooden peg leg where a real one used to be, revealed to have been lost in an off-screen encounter with Blackbeard. Barbossa is feared as an omen of death and referred to as "the one legged man" by Blackbeard and his daughter Angelica, which is a parallel to Billy Bones having feared John Silver and ominously referred to him by the same moniker. Regarding this change in Barbossa, actor Geoffrey Rush noted Robert Newton playing Long John Silver in Treasure Island.

Terry Rossio references Treasure Island and Treasure Planet in the annotations for his screenplay draft for Pirates of the Caribbean: Dead Men Tell No Tales, which features a character named Captain (later Admiral) John Benbow as a reference to the Admiral Benbow Inn. One of Chris Schweizer's early ideas for the Pirates of the Caribbean comic book series was to have Will Turner and Elizabeth Swann's 12-or-13-year-old son be involved in Jack Sparrow's search for Anamaria who had disappeared while searching for a mystical treasure, with the boy eventually growing up and becoming Billy Bones, a character from Treasure Island. A phantom pirate named Black Dog Briar appears in the video game expansion.

== See also ==
- Elenore Abbott, illustrator
- Moral Emblems
