= Word of Mouth (radio programme) =

BBC Radio programme

BBC Radio's Word of Mouth is a programme about English and the way it is spoken. It is broadcast regularly on BBC Radio 4 and is presented by Michael Rosen. The programme looks at all aspects of the spoken word from slang, acronyms, strange vocabulary, jargon and poetry; along with etymology, and changes through time and among society. It has a very lively message board to which the presenter regularly contributes. The programme is part of a stable of network radio programmes produced in Bristol for Radio 4.

The programme was devised and originally presented by Frank Delaney with Simon Elmes as producer and was first broadcast in 1992.

== Bibliography ==
- Elmes, Simon & Rosen, Michael (2002). Word of Mouth. Oxford University Press. ISBN 0-19-866263-7
