= Jim Hawkins and the Curse of Treasure Island =

2001 novel by Frank Delaney

Jim Hawkins and the Curse of Treasure Island is a 2001 adventure novel by Frank Delaney, written under the pseudonym of Francis Bryan. It is a sequel to the 1883 novel Treasure Island by Robert Louis Stevenson.

== Plot summary ==
Twelve years after the events chronicled in Treasure Island, Jim Hawkins (the narrator) takes up ownership of the Admiral Benbow Inn. He improves the inn with his share of the treasure taken from the island, and becomes well known as a raconteur of his adventures.

He is visited by a lady travelling by coach from Bristol, without any luggage but with a young boy. She identifies herself as Grace Richardson with her son Louis; she is much agitated and seeks information from Jim as to the location of Joseph Tait. Jim recalls Tait as being one of the pirates marooned on the island. Jim takes her to the safety of his inn. A party of men approach the inn; Louis is brutally attacked by one of them. Hawkins rushes to the rescue and in so doing, kills the attacker. The dead man's companions besiege the inn, demanding that Jim surrender to the law. Their leader, Sir Thomas Maltby, claims to be a Court Councillor, with power to hold inquiries, convene summary courts and pass sentence, but he is delayed by the intervention of Squire Trelawney, allowing Jim to escape. Maltby says that the dead man was his cousin, the Duke of Berwick.

Jim seeks the assistance of his uncle Ambrose Hatt, a well-connected lawyer in Bristol, who manages to delay any legal moves to arrest Jim. It is decided that an expedition must return to Treasure Island to see if Tait is still alive. Grace will still not explain her connection with Tait, but Jim suspects that Louis is his son.

The ship Hispaniola, which Jim knows well, is chartered. Under the command of Captain Reid, it sails to the island, but is shadowed by a black-sailed brig, unidentified but possibly owned by Maltby and his followers.

Jim accompanies a party of sailors ashore. He is separated from them, and cannot find them again; they have vanished without trace. In a dark cave, he is captured by a man he cannot see, but suspects of being Tait. He barely escapes on a crude raft and drifts for several days before being rescued, more dead than alive. He is unable to speak or see, but discovers that he is on board the black brig, commanded by Maltby. He identifies himself as Mills, an assay clerk sent to value the silver left behind on the island.

The ship enters port on a nearby coast, where Jim is given into the case of Dr Ballantyne. When he is sufficiently recovered, Jim explains his story to the doctor, who takes him to visit his neighbour, Long John Silver, now living in comfort in a fine villa.

Jim, Silver and Ballantyne join the ship and return to Treasure Island. Jim contrives to board the Hispaniola, whilst Captain Reid keeps Maltby's crew at bay. He had previously claimed to have plague aboard, preventing Maltby from boarding.

A fresh expedition searches the island. Many dead bodies are found and it becomes clear that Tait and an unnamed and unseen companion had survived by wrecking ships and brutally enslaving some of the survivors. Tait is captured; his giant companion is killed. Tait is taken on board the Hispaniola.

Fighting ensues between the crews of the ships. Tait is killed, as is Maltby. The many dead are buried at sea.

Jim now learns at least part of the truth. Maltby stood to inherit the title and estates of the Duke of Berwick if Grace's son Louis died. Grace had been secretly married to the heir of the estate, and Louis was their son. Tait, then a coachman, witnessed the ceremony. Grace and Louis had been fleeing from Maltby. Fortunately, Ambrose Hutt has persuaded Tait to sign a document attesting to the circumstances, before he was killed.

Jim had hoped to marry Grace, but he is surprised and disappointed that his Uncle Ambrose, despite the age difference, has got in first. However, Louis comes to stay at the Admiral Benbow until he comes of age and can claim the inheritance.

With the fresh treasure taken from the island, Jim further improves the inn and expands its clientele. He builds a small house nearby for Ben Gunn, who had assisted in the expedition.
