= Harold Augustin Calahan =

American novelist

- Born: November 7, 1889; Brooklyn, New York, US
- Died: November 25, 1965 (aged 76); Port Chester, New York, US
- Occupation: author
- Writing career
- Notable work: Back to Treasure Island (1935)
- Military career
- Branch: United States Navy
- Rank: lieutenant commander

Harold Augustin Calahan (November 7, 1889 – November 25, 1965) or H. A. Calahan was a lieutenant commander in the United States Navy and an author on sailing.

He was born in Brooklyn and attended Columbia University for his B.S., M.S. and his law degree. In 1917 he was working at an advertising agency, and he later married Gladys Britton. He died of a heart attack in 1965 in Port Chester, New York, and was buried in Arlington National Cemetery on November 30, 1965.

He is known for writing the novel Back to Treasure Island (1935), a sequel to Robert Louis Stevenson's Treasure Island. He strongly argued that Stevenson had in mind to write such a story.

== Author ==
- Learning to Sail (1932)
- Learning to Race (1934)
- Back to Treasure Island (1935)
- Yachtsman's Omnibus: Learning to Sail, Learning to Race, Learning to Cruise (1935)
- Wind and Tide in Yacht Racing (1936)
- Ships's Husband: A Guide to Yachtsmen in the Care of Their Craft (1937)
- Gadgets and Wrinkles: A Compendium of Man's Ingenuity at Sea (1938)
- So You're Going to Buy a Boat (1939)
- Rigging (1940)
- What makes a war end? (1944)
- Learning to Cruise (1945)
- Geography for grown-ups (1946)
- Sailing technique (1950)
- The Heavens As a Guide: The Sky and the Sailor; A History of Celestial Navigation (1952)
