= Frank Delaney =

Irish novelist, journalist and broadcaster (1941–2017)

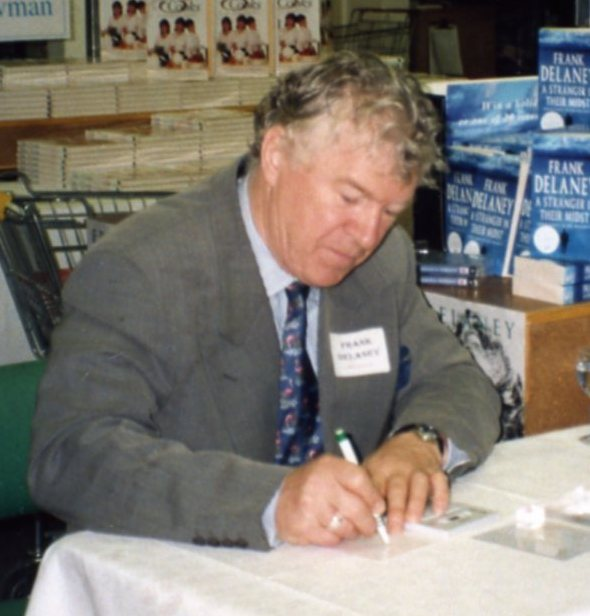
- Delaney in March 2008
- Born: 24 October 1942; Thomastown, County Tipperary, Ireland
- Died: 21 February 2017 (aged 74); Litchfield County, Connecticut, USA
- Occupations: Novelist, journalist, broadcaster
- Spouse(s): Eilish Kelliher, Susan Collier, Salley Vickers
- Children: Frank, Bryan, Owen
- Writing career
- Notable works: Ireland; The Matchmaker of Kenmare; Simple Courage: A True Story of Peril on the Sea; Tipperary; Shannon; The Amethysts; James Joyce's Odyssey; The Celts (BBC); Goodbye, Mr. Chips (screenplay)

Francis James Joseph Raphael Delaney (24 October 1942 – 21 February 2017) was an Irish novelist, journalist and broadcaster. He was the author of The New York Times best-seller Ireland, the non-fiction book Simple Courage: A True Story of Peril on the Sea and many other works of fiction, non-fiction and collections.

== Early life ==
Delaney was born in Thomastown, County Tipperary, Ireland, on 24 October 1942. His father, Edward, was the principal of the national school in Thomastown; his mother, Elizabeth Josephine O'Sullivan, was a teacher at the school.

== Broadcasting career ==
Delaney began working as a newsreader for the Irish state radio and television network RTÉ in 1970. In the early 1970s, he became a news reporter for the BBC in Dublin, and covered an intense period of violence known as the Troubles. After five years of reporting on the violence, he moved to London to work in arts broadcasting. In 1978, he created the weekly Bookshelf programme for BBC Radio 4, which covered books, writers and the business of publishing. Over the next five-and-a-half years he interviewed more than 1,400 authors, including Anthony Burgess, John Updike, Margaret Atwood, Christopher Isherwood and Stephen King.

On television, Delaney wrote and presented for Omnibus, the BBC's weekly arts series. He served as the Literature Director of the Edinburgh Festival in 1980, and hosted his own talk show Frank Delaney in the early 1980s, which featured many cultural and literary personalities. He later created and presented Word of Mouth, the BBC's radio programme about language, as well as a variety of radio and television documentaries including specials on James Joyce, Robert Graves, Ernest Hemingway in Paris, and the Shakespeare industry. He presented The Book Show on the Sky News satellite channel for many years.

== Writing career ==
Delaney said in a 2014 interview that he had wanted to be a novelist since childhood. “I've always relished the power of the tale,” he said, “how it grabs us and then absorbs us, and casts a spell over us, and teaches us." His first book, James Joyce's Odyssey (1981), was well received and became a best-seller in the UK and Ireland. He wrote and presented the six-part documentary series The Celts (1987) for the BBC, and wrote the accompanying book. He subsequently wrote five books of non-fiction (including Simple Courage), ten novels (including Ireland, Venetia Kelly's Traveling Show and Tipperary), one novella, and a number of short stories. He also edited many compilations of essays and poetry.

Delaney wrote the screenplay for an adaptation of Goodbye, Mr. Chips (2002), which starred Martin Clunes and was shown on ITV in Britain, and in the Masterpiece Theatre series in the United States. His articles were published by newspapers in United States, the UK and Ireland, including on the Op-ed pages of The New York Times. He was a frequent public speaker, and was a contributor and guest on NPR programmes.

On Bloomsday 2010, Delaney launched Re:Joyce, a series of short weekly podcasts that went page-by-page through James Joyce's Ulysses, discussing its allusions, historical context and references.

== Private life and death ==
Delaney lived in Ireland, England and the USA. His first marriage was to Eilish Kelliher, with whom he had his three sons, Frank, Bryan and Owen. He married three times more, firstly to Susan Collier, co-founder of an international textile design company, and secondly to Salley Vickers, the award-winning author.

Frank Delaney died on 21 February 2017 at the age of 74 in Litchfield County, Connecticut, USA.

== Bibliography ==
=== Fiction ===
- The Last Storyteller (2012, Random House)
- The Matchmaker of Kenmare (2011, Random House)
- Venetia Kelly's Traveling Show (2010, Random House)
- Shannon, A Novel (2009, Random House)
- Tipperary, A Novel (2007, Random House)
- Ireland, A Novel (2005, HarperCollins & Time Warner)
- At Ruby's (2001, HarperCollins)
- Jim Hawkins and the Curse of Treasure Island (2001, Orion)
- Pearl (1999, HarperCollins)
- Desire and Pursuit (1998, HarperCollins)
- A Stranger in their Midst (1995, HarperCollins)
- Telling the Pictures (1994, HarperCollins)
- The Sins of the Mothers (1992, HarperCollins)
- My Dark Rosaleen (1989, CenturyHutchinson)
- The Amethysts (1977, HarperCollins)

=== Non-fiction ===
- Undead (2011, RosettaBooks)
- Simple Courage: A True Story of Peril on the Sea (2006, Random House)
- A Walk to the Western Isles: After Boswell and Johnson (1993, HarperCollins)
- Legends of the Celts (1989, Hodder & Stoughton)
- A Walk in the Dark Ages (1988, HarperCollins)
- The Celts (1986, Hodder & Stoughton)
- Betjeman Country (1983, Hodder & Stoughton)
- James Joyce's Odyssey (1981, Hodder & Stoughton)

=== Collections ===
- The Folio Society/Hutchinson Book of Essays (1990, Folio Society & CenturyHutchinson)
- The Folio Book of Irish Short Stories (1999, Folio Society)
- The Poems of Christy Brown
- The Landleaguers by Anthony Trollope (Folio Society)
- Short Stories from the Strand (Folio Society)
- The Novels of James Kennaway
- The Go-Between by L.P. Hartley (Folio Society)
- Kidnapped by Robert Louis Stevenson (Folio Society)
- Caitriona by Robert Louis Stevenson (1988, Folio Society)
- Silver Apples, Golden Apples; Best Loved Irish Verse (1987, Blackstaff Press)

=== Screenplays ===
- Goodbye, Mr. Chips (2003, from the James Hilton book, directed by Stuart Orme. Aired on ITV in London and Masterpiece Theatre)
- Across the River and into the Trees (2001, from the Ernest Hemingway novella, for Working Title Television, London, not produced)
- Telling the Pictures (1995, from Delaney's own novel, under option with Spikings Entertainment, Los Angeles)
- My Dark Rosaleen (1993, From Delaney's own novella, endowed by the European Script Fund)

=== Podcasts ===
- Re:Joyce, weekly podcast on James Joyce's "Ulysses" (2010–2017, planned until 2026, www.frankdelaney.com)
